= Eurus =

East wind god in Greek mythology

- God of the East Wind
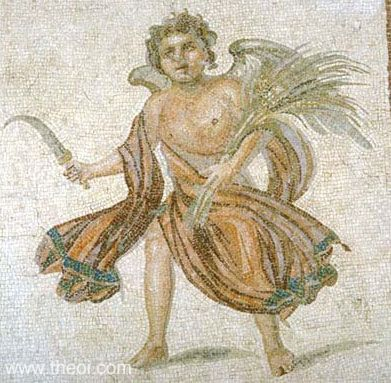
- Eurus on a mosaic from Antioch.
- Greek: Εὖρος
- Abode: Sky

Genealogy
- Parents: Astraeus and Eos
- Siblings: Winds (Boreas, Notus, and Zephyrus), Eosphorus, the Stars, Memnon, Emathion, Astraea

Equivalents
- Roman: Vulturnus

In ancient Greek mythology and religion, Eurus (Ancient Greek: Εὖρος, romanized: Eûros, lit. 'east wind') is the god and personification of the east wind, although sometimes he is also said to be southeast specifically. He is one of the four principal wind gods, the Anemoi, alongside his brothers Boreas (north wind), Zephyrus (west wind) and Notus (south wind).

Eurus is featured rarely in ancient literature and art, mostly appearing together with his three brothers as part of a whole if at all, and virtually has no individual mythology of his own. Often he is excluded from the group entirely, leaving Boreas, Zephyrus and Notus to represent the Anemoi. His Roman equivalent is the god Vulturnus.

== Etymology ==
The ancient Greek noun εὖρος (eûros) refers to the wind that blows from the east. Its ultimate etymology is not clear, although it has been variously connected to the Greek words for the dawn (Ancient Greek: ἠώς, ēṓs) and aura (Ancient Greek: αὔρα, aúra).

== Attributes and family ==
Eurus is traditionally the god of the east or south-east wind. He has been both described as rain-bringing and a dry type of wind.

Eurus, unlike the three other principal wind gods, is often skipped by ancient authors. He is the only one not to be mentioned by Hesiod at all, who makes the three beneficial winds the children of Eos (the dawn goddess) and her husband Astraeus, and says that all the other, non-beneficial for humanity winds are the sons of Typhon. Instead of Eurus, Hesiod only speaks of "Argestes" for the fourth, which could also refer to Apeliotes occasionally (the god of the southeast wind). Similarly, he is the only one among the four who does not have an Orphic Hymn sang in his honour.

It is thus Nonnus, a fifth-century AD author from Panopolis who made Eurus one of the children of Eos and Astraeus in his Dionysiaca.

== Mythology ==
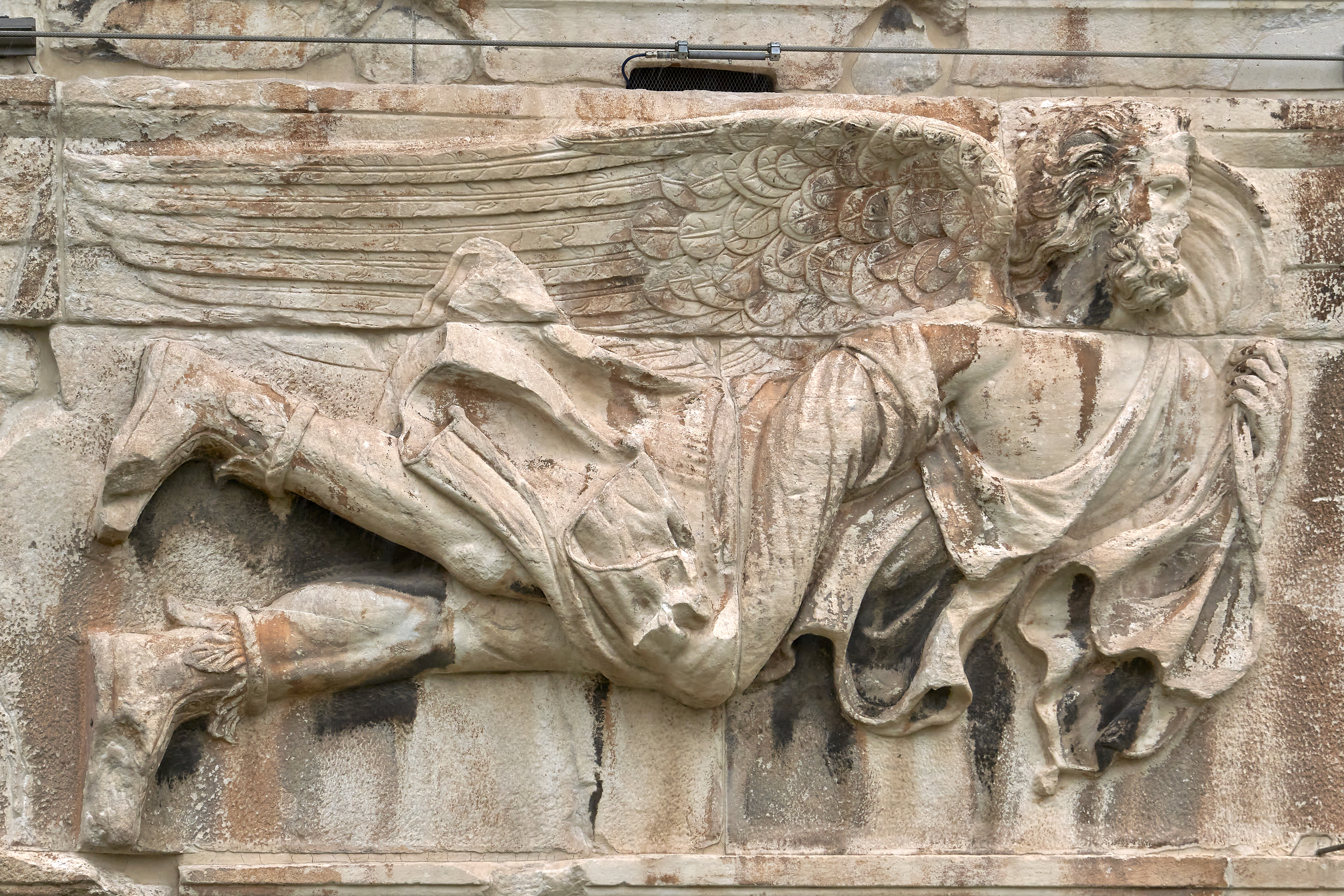
Eurus relief from the Tower of the Winds in Athens, Greece.

In his few appearances in mythology, Eurus is usually paired with Notus, the south wind, like Zephyrus is paired with Boreas. Like Notus and unlike Zephyrus/Boreas, Eurus has little to no mythology of his own, and only appears as part of a whole when the Anemoi feature in some tale.

=== Odyssey ===
According to the Odyssey the winds seem to dwell on the island of Aeolia, as Zeus has made Aeolus the keeper of the winds. Aeolus receives Odysseus and his crew warmly, and keeps them as guests for a month. As they part, Aeolus gives Odysseus a bag containing all the winds, except for the gentle Zephyrus who blows them back home. Although warned not to open the bag under any circumstances, Odysseus's crewmates however foolishly open the bag, thinking it to contain some treasure, and set free Eurus along with all the other winds as well, who then blow the ships back to Aeolia, whereupon Aeolus refused to help them a second time.

Some time later, he and Notus strand Odysseus on Thrinacia, the island of the sun-god Helios, for an entire month, following their departure from the island of Circe. After Odysseus left Calypso, the sea-god Poseidon in anger let loose all four of them, Eurus included, to cause a storm and raise great waves in order to drown him.

=== Other appearances ===
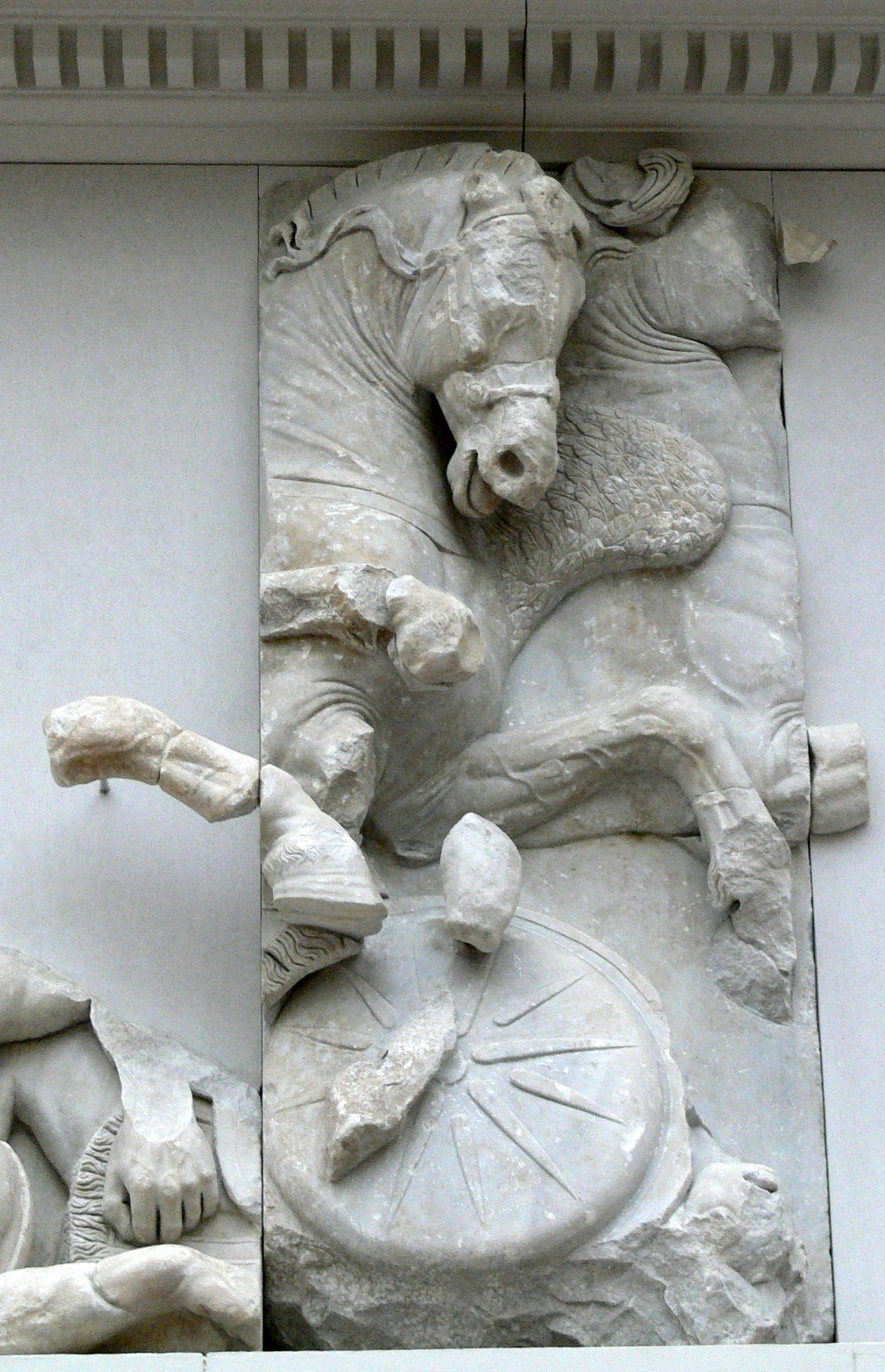
The horses on the Pergamon Altar, Pergamon Museum in Berlin.

In the Dionysiaca, he and his confirmed brothers live with their father Astraeus; Eurus serves nectar in cups when Demeter pays the family a visit.

In the Pergamon Altar, which depicts the battle of the gods against the Giants, Eurus and the other three wind gods are shown in the shape of horses who pull Hera's chariot; traces of their equine form are also found in Quintus Smyrnaeus's works, where they pull Zeus's chariot instead.

== Cult ==
Early attestation of Eurus and wind-related worship is found in the Mycenaean Greek words a-ne-mo-i-je-re-ja (Linear B: 𐀀𐀚𐀗𐀂𐀋𐀩𐀊) and a-ne-mo i-je-re-ja (Linear B: 𐀀𐀚𐀗𐄀𐀂𐀋𐀩𐀊), that is, "priestess of the winds", found on the KN Fp 1 and KN Fp 13 tablets. In post-Greek Dark Ages times, traces of Eurus's worship as part of the Four Winds is found in Titane in Corinthia where a sanctuary to the Winds stood, Sparta where Eurus was described as the 'saviour of Sparta,' Coronea where they had an altar, and Attica.

== Vulturnus ==
For the Romans, Eurus was identified with the god Vulturnus ("he from Vultur", a mountain in Apulia, perhaps related to the world "vulture"), closely associated with dry and warm weather. He was also called Africanus (meaning "he from Africa") occasionally, due to the dry type of east wind the ancients knew.

== Genealogy ==
Eurus's family tree

Uranus	Gaia	Pontus
Oceanus	Tethys	Hyperion	Theia	Crius	Eurybia
The Rivers	The Oceanids	Helios	Selene	Eos	Astraeus	Pallas	Perses
EURUS; Anemoi	Astraea	Stars
Cronus	Rhea	Coeus	Phoebe
Hestia	Hera	Hades	Zeus	Leto	Asteria
Demeter	Poseidon
Iapetus	Clymene (or Asia)	Mnemosyne	(Zeus)	Themis
Atlas	Menoetius	Prometheus	Epimetheus	The Muses	The Horae

== See also ==
- Bacab
- Dáinn, Dvalinn, Duneyrr and Duraþrór
- Norðri, Suðri, Austri and Vestri
- Vayu
- List of wind deities

== Bibliography ==
- Gantz, Timothy (1996). Early Greek Myth: A guide to literary and artistic sources. Baltimore, MD: Johns Hopkins University Press; in two volumes: (Vol. 1) ISBN 978-0-8018-5360-9; (Vol. 2) ISBN 978-0-8018-5362-3.
- Grimal, Pierre (1987). The Dictionary of Classical Mythology. Translated by A. R. Maxwell-Hyslop. New York, USA: Wiley-Blackwell. ISBN 0-631-13209-0.
- Hard, Robin (2004). The Routledge Handbook of Greek Mythology: Based on H.J. Rose's "Handbook of Greek Mythology". Psychology Press. ISBN 9780415186360.
- Hesiod, Theogony, in The Homeric Hymns and Homerica with an English Translation by Hugh G. Evelyn-White, Cambridge, MA., Harvard University Press; London, William Heinemann Ltd. 1914. Online version at the Perseus Digital Library.
- Homer, The Iliad with an English Translation by A.T. Murray, PhD in two volumes. Cambridge, MA., Harvard University Press; London, William Heinemann, Ltd. 1924. Online version at the Perseus Digital Library.
- Homer; The Odyssey with an English Translation by A.T. Murray, PH.D. in two volumes. Cambridge, MA., Harvard University Press; London, William Heinemann, Ltd. 1919. Online version at the Perseus Digital Library.
- Kerenyi, Karl (1951). The Gods of the Greeks. London, UK: Thames and Hudson.
- Kunze, Max (1994). Lexicon Iconographicum Mythologiae Classicae (LIMC). Vol. VII.1. Zürich and Munich: Artemis Verlag. ISBN 3-7608-8751-1.
- Lactantius Placidus, Lactantii Placidi qui dicitur Commentarios in Statii Thebaida it Commentarium in Achilleida recensuit, translated by Richard Jahnke, 1898, B. G. Tevbneri, Lipsiae.
- Liddell, Henry George; Scott, Robert (1940). A Greek-English Lexicon, revised and augmented throughout by Sir Henry Stuart Jones with the assistance of Roderick McKenzie. Oxford: Clarendon Press. Online version at Perseus.tufts project.
- Myrsiades, Kostas (April 5, 2019). Reading Homer's Odyssey. Pennsylvania, USA: Bucknell University Press. ISBN 9781684481361.
- Nonnus, Dionysiaca; translated by Rouse, W H D, III Books XXXVI-XLVIII. Loeb Classical Library No. 346, Cambridge, Massachusetts, Harvard University Press; London, William Heinemann Ltd. 1940. Internet Archive.
- Pausanias, Pausanias Description of Greece with an English Translation by W.H.S. Jones, Litt.D., and H.A. Ormerod, M.A., in 4 Volumes. Cambridge, MA, Harvard University Press; London, William Heinemann Ltd. 1918. Online version at the Perseus Digital Library.
- Quintus Smyrnaeus, Quintus Smyrnaeus: The Fall of Troy, translated by A.S. Way, Cambridge, Massachusetts, Harvard University Press, 1913. Internet Archive.
- Smith, William (1873). Dictionary of Greek and Roman Biography and Mythology. Vol. III: Oarses–Zygia. London: John Murray.
