= Notus =

South wind god in Greek mythology

- God of the South Wind
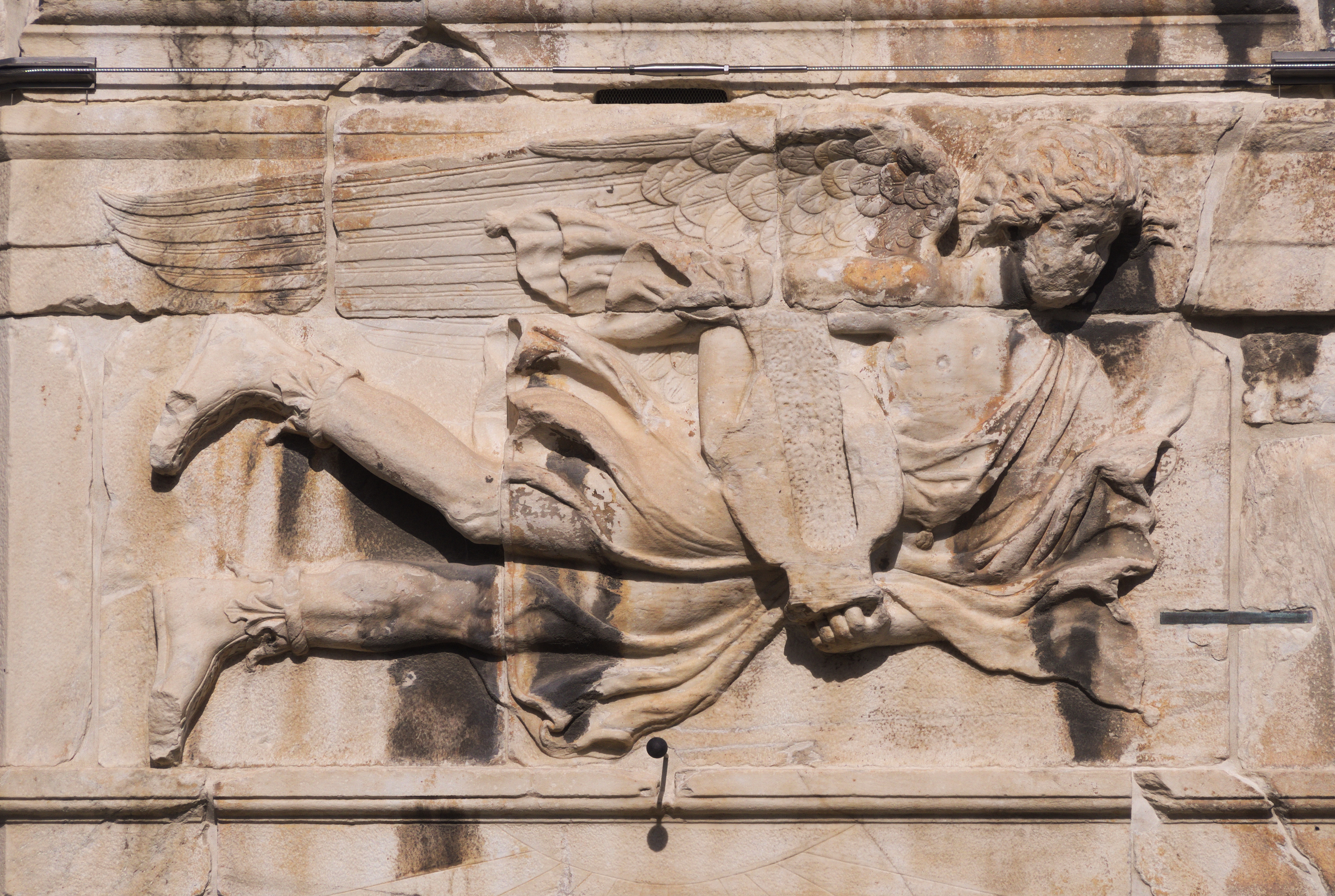
- Notus on the relief of the Tower of the Winds, Athens, Greece.
- Greek: Νότος
- Abode: Sky

Genealogy
- Parents: Eos and Astraeus
- Siblings: Winds (Boreas, Eurus, and Zephyrus), Eosphorus, the Stars, Memnon, Emathion, Astraea

In Greek mythology and religion, Notus (Ancient Greek: Νότος, romanized: Nótos, lit. 'south') is the god of the south wind and one of the Anemoi (wind-gods), sons of the dawn goddess Eos and the star-god Astraeus. A desiccating wind of heat, Notus was associated with the storms of late summer and early autumn, wetness, mist, and was seen as a rain-bringer. Unlike his two more notable brothers, Boreas (the god of the north wind) and Zephyrus (the god of the west wind), Notus has little to no unique mythology of his own.

== Etymology ==
The Greek noun νότος refers both to the south cardinal direction and the south wind that blows from it. Its ultimate etymology remains unknown, although a pre-Greek origin seems to be the most likely origin.

== Family ==
In Hesiod's Theogony, Notus is the son of Eos, the goddess of the dawn, and Astraeus, her husband. He is the sibling of the other winds, who Hesiod lists as Zephyrus and Boreas. Thus, he is brother to the stars and the justice goddess Astraea, and half-brother to the mortals Memnon and Emathion, sons of his mother Eos by the Trojan prince Tithonus. Notus has no known consorts, lovers or offspring.

The ancient Greeks distinguished the three types of wind blowing from the south; the first was notos (the one Notus mostly represents) which blew from various directions in winter and was seen as the rain-bringer that obscured visibility, the second was leukonotos ("white notus") which was milder and cleared up the sky, and the third was the hot bringer of dust, identified with sirocco.

== Mythology ==
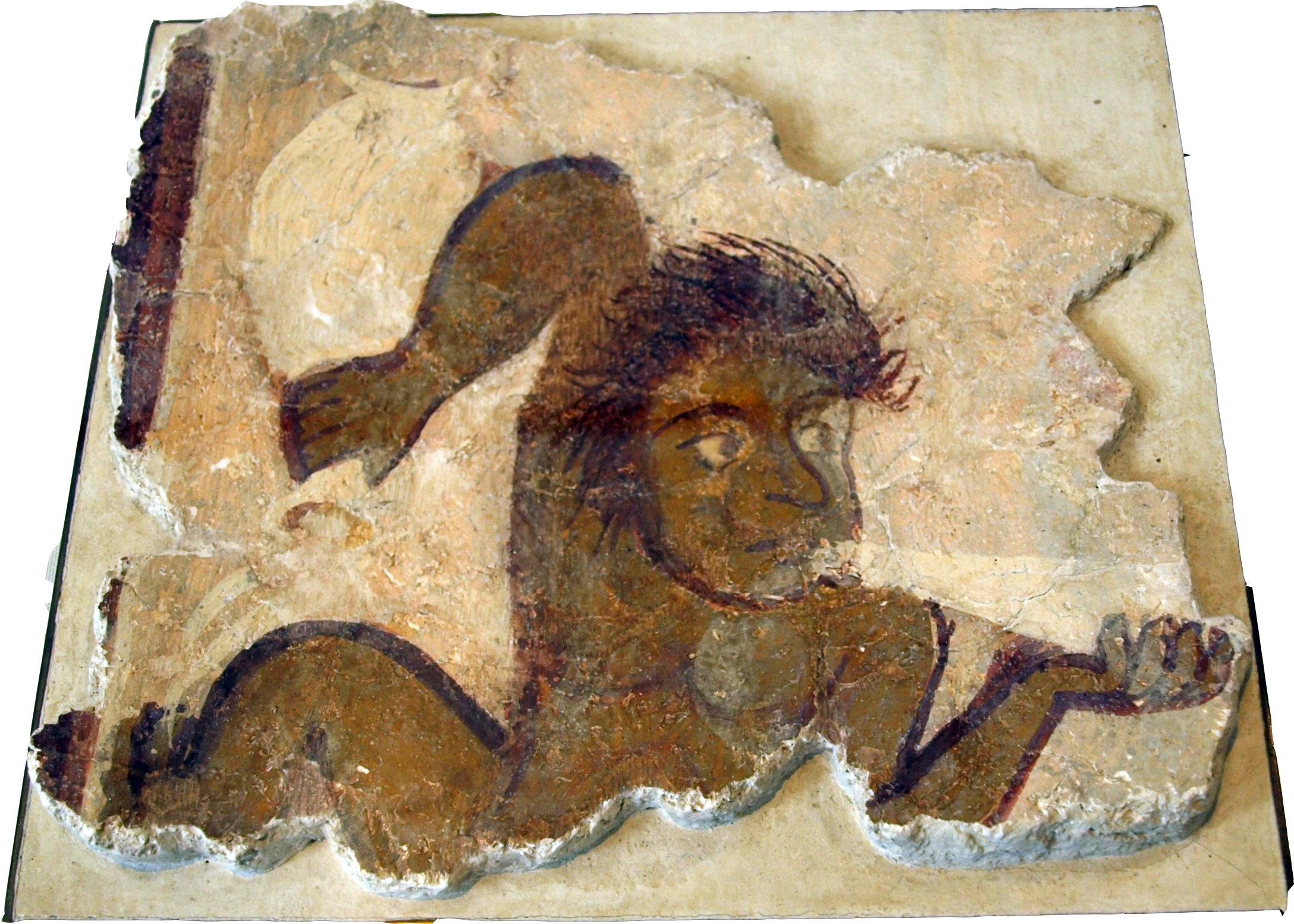
Byzantine fresco depicting Notus.

Notus is one of the three wind-gods mentioned by Hesiod, alongside his brothers Boreas and Zephyrus, the three wind gods seen as beneficial by the ancient Greeks. Unlike his two more prominent brothers however, Notus has very little mythology, and mostly appears in conjugation with his brothers, with too few unique appearances to differentiate him from the rest. In his few appearances in mythology, Notus is usually paired with his full brother Eurus, the god and personification of the east wind.

In his preparation for the Great Deluge, Zeus locked up Boreas and the other cloud-blowing gales, and let Notus free, to rain upon the earth, who let it pour all over the globe, drowning almost everyone.

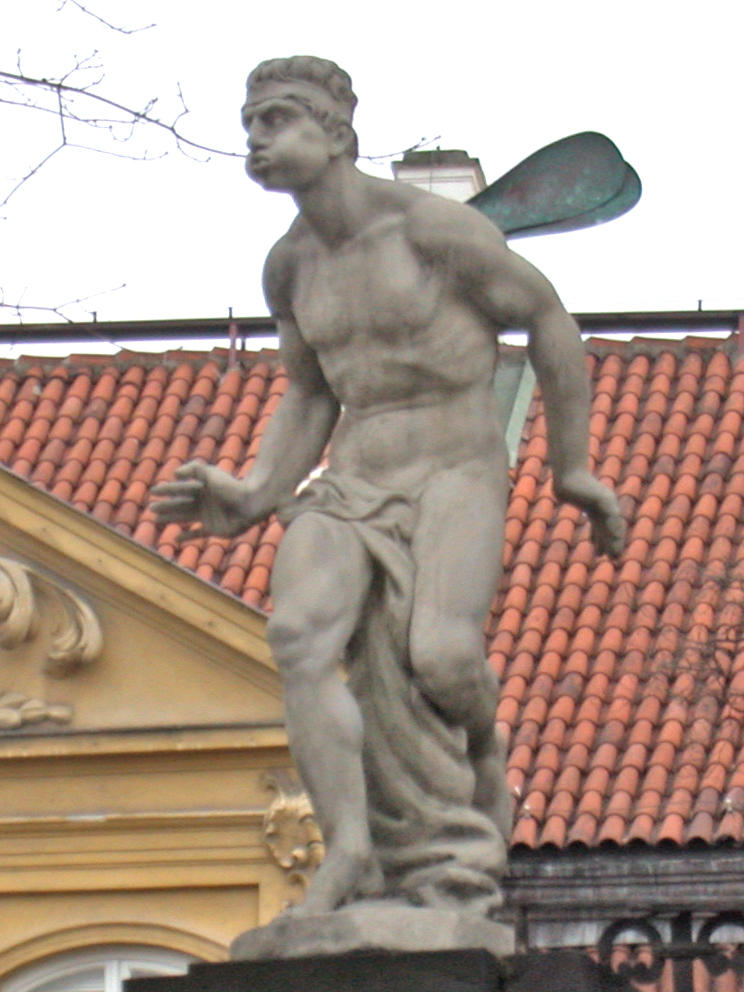
Statue of Notus.

In the Odyssey the winds seem to dwell on the island of Aeolia, as Zeus has made Aeolus keeper of the winds. Aeolus receives Odysseus and his crew, and keeps them as guests for a month. As they part, Aeolus gives Odysseus a bag containing all the winds, except for Zephyrus; although warned not to open the bag, Odysseus's crewmates however foolishly open the bag, thinking it to contain some treasure, and set free Notus along with all the other winds as well, who then blow the ships back to Aeolia. Much later, he and Eurus strand Odysseus on Thrinacia, the island of the sun-god Helios, for an entire month.

In the Dionysiaca meanwhile, he and his brothers live with their father Astraeus; Notus serves water from a jug when Demeter pays a visit. In the Iliad, Notus dined together with his brothers in a far away land as Iris visited to summon Boreas and Zephyrus.

In one of his few defining appearances, Notus features in two of the Dialogues of the Sea Gods, a satirical work by Lucian of Samosata. In the first, he and Zephyrus discuss the woes of the Argive princess Io at the hands of Zeus and Hera, while in the second Zephyrus enthusiastically describes the marvellous scene of the abduction of Europa by the bull, while Notus admits in disappointment having seen nothing of note.

== Iconography ==
Notus appears rarely in ancient Greek or Roman art. In the Pergamon Altar, which depicts the battle of the gods against the Giants, Notus and the other three wind gods are shown as horse-shaped deities who pull Hera's chariot; their equine form is also found in Quintus Smyrnaeus's works, where they pull Zeus instead. In the Tower of the Winds, a Roman-era octagonal clock tower in Athens, Notus is depicted in middle relief as a beardless young man emptying a water-filled pointed amphora, symbolizing rain.

== Auster ==
For the Romans, Notus was identified with the god Auster ("south"), closely associated with the sirocco wind. Like Notus himself, Auster has no big role in mythology. The name, Auster, means south and is the root of words such as Australia, literally "south land."

== Genealogy ==
Notus's family tree

Uranus	Gaia	Pontus
Oceanus	Tethys	Hyperion	Theia	Crius	Eurybia
The Rivers	The Oceanids	Helios	Selene	Eos	Astraeus	Pallas	Perses
NOTUS; Anemoi	Astraea	Stars
Cronus	Rhea	Coeus	Phoebe
Hestia	Hera	Hades	Zeus	Leto	Asteria
Demeter	Poseidon
Iapetus	Clymene (or Asia)	Mnemosyne	(Zeus)	Themis
Atlas	Menoetius	Prometheus	Epimetheus	The Muses	The Horae

== See also ==
- Bacab
- Dáinn, Dvalinn, Duneyrr and Duraþrór
- Norðri, Suðri, Austri and Vestri
- Vayu
- List of wind deities

== Bibliography ==
- Apollodorus, Apollodorus, The Library, with an English Translation by Sir James George Frazer, F.B.A., F.R.S. in 2 Volumes. Cambridge, MA, Harvard University Press; London, William Heinemann Ltd. 1921. Online version at the Perseus Digital Library.
- Beekes, Robert S. P. (2010). Lucien van Beek (ed.). Etymological Dictionary of Greek. Leiden Indo-European Etymological Dictionary Series. Vol. 2. Leiden, the Netherlands: Brill Publications. ISBN 978-90-04-17419-1.
- Gantz, Timothy (1996). Early Greek Myth: A guide to literary and artistic sources. Baltimore, MD: Johns Hopkins University Press; in two volumes: (Vol. 1) ISBN 978-0-8018-5360-9; (Vol. 2) ISBN 978-0-8018-5362-3.
- Grimal, Pierre (1987). The Dictionary of Classical Mythology. Translated by A. R. Maxwell-Hyslop. New York, USA: Wiley-Blackwell. ISBN 0-631-13209-0.
- Hard, Robin (2004). The Routledge Handbook of Greek Mythology: Based on H.J. Rose's "Handbook of Greek Mythology". Psychology Press. ISBN 9780415186360.
- Hesiod, Theogony, in The Homeric Hymns and Homerica with an English Translation by Hugh G. Evelyn-White, Cambridge, MA., Harvard University Press; London, William Heinemann Ltd. 1914. Online version at the Perseus Digital Library.
- Homer, The Iliad with an English Translation by A.T. Murray, PhD in two volumes. Cambridge, MA., Harvard University Press; London, William Heinemann, Ltd. 1924. Online version at the Perseus Digital Library.
- Homer; The Odyssey with an English Translation by A.T. Murray, PH.D. in two volumes. Cambridge, MA., Harvard University Press; London, William Heinemann, Ltd. 1919. Online version at the Perseus Digital Library.
- Kerenyi, Karl (1951). The Gods of the Greeks. London, UK: Thames and Hudson.
- Kunze, Max (1994). Lexicon Iconographicum Mythologiae Classicae (LIMC). Vol. VII.1. Zürich and Munich: Artemis Verlag. ISBN 3-7608-8751-1.
- Liddell, Henry George; Scott, Robert (1940). A Greek-English Lexicon, revised and augmented throughout by Sir Henry Stuart Jones with the assistance of Roderick McKenzie. Oxford: Clarendon Press. Online version at Perseus.tufts project.
- Lucian, The Works of Lucian of Samosata, translated by H. W. Fowler and F. G. Fowler, Oxford: The Clarendon Press, 1905.
- Myrsiades, Kostas (April 5, 2019). Reading Homer's Odyssey. Pennsylvania, USA: Bucknell University Press. ISBN 9781684481361.
- Nonnus, Dionysiaca; translated by Rouse, W H D, III Books XXXVI-XLVIII. Loeb Classical Library No. 346, Cambridge, Massachusetts, Harvard University Press; London, William Heinemann Ltd. 1940. Internet Archive.
- Ovid, Metamorphoses, translated by Arthur Golding. London. W. Seres. 1567. Online text at Perseus.tufts project.
- Quintus Smyrnaeus, Quintus Smyrnaeus: The Fall of Troy, translated by A.S. Way, Cambridge, Massachusetts, Harvard University Press, 1913. Internet Archive.
