= Perses (mythology) =

Several men in Greek mythology

In Greek mythology, Perses (Ancient Greek: Πέρσης, romanized: Pérsēs, lit. 'destroyer') can refer to the following individuals:

- Perses, the son of the Titan Crius and the sea-goddess Eurybia, brother to Astraeus and Pallas. He married his cousin Asteria and became the father of Hecate.
- Perses, the son of the sun-god Helios and the sea-nymph Perse.
- Perses, the son of Perseus and Andromeda and legendary ancestor of the Persians.
- Perses, the father of Chariclo. He might be one of the others above.

== See also ==
- Hierax (mythology)
- Asteria (mythology)
- Menestratus

== Bibliography ==
- Apollodorus, Apollodorus, The Library, with an English Translation by Sir James George Frazer, F.B.A., F.R.S. in 2 Volumes. Cambridge, MA, Harvard University Press; London, William Heinemann Ltd. 1921. Online version at the Perseus Digital Library.
- Herodotus, Histories with an English translation by A. D. Godley. Cambridge. Harvard University Press. 1920. Online version available at Perseus Digital Library.
- Hesiod, Theogony in The Homeric Hymns and Homerica with an English Translation by Hugh G. Evelyn-White, Cambridge, MA., Harvard University Press; London, William Heinemann Ltd. 1914. Online version at the Perseus Digital Library.
- Hyginus, Gaius Julius, The Myths of Hyginus. Edited and translated by Mary A. Grant, Lawrence: University of Kansas Press, 1960. Available online at Topos Text.
