= Dione (Titaness) =

Greek goddess, mother of Aphrodite

- Oracular goddess
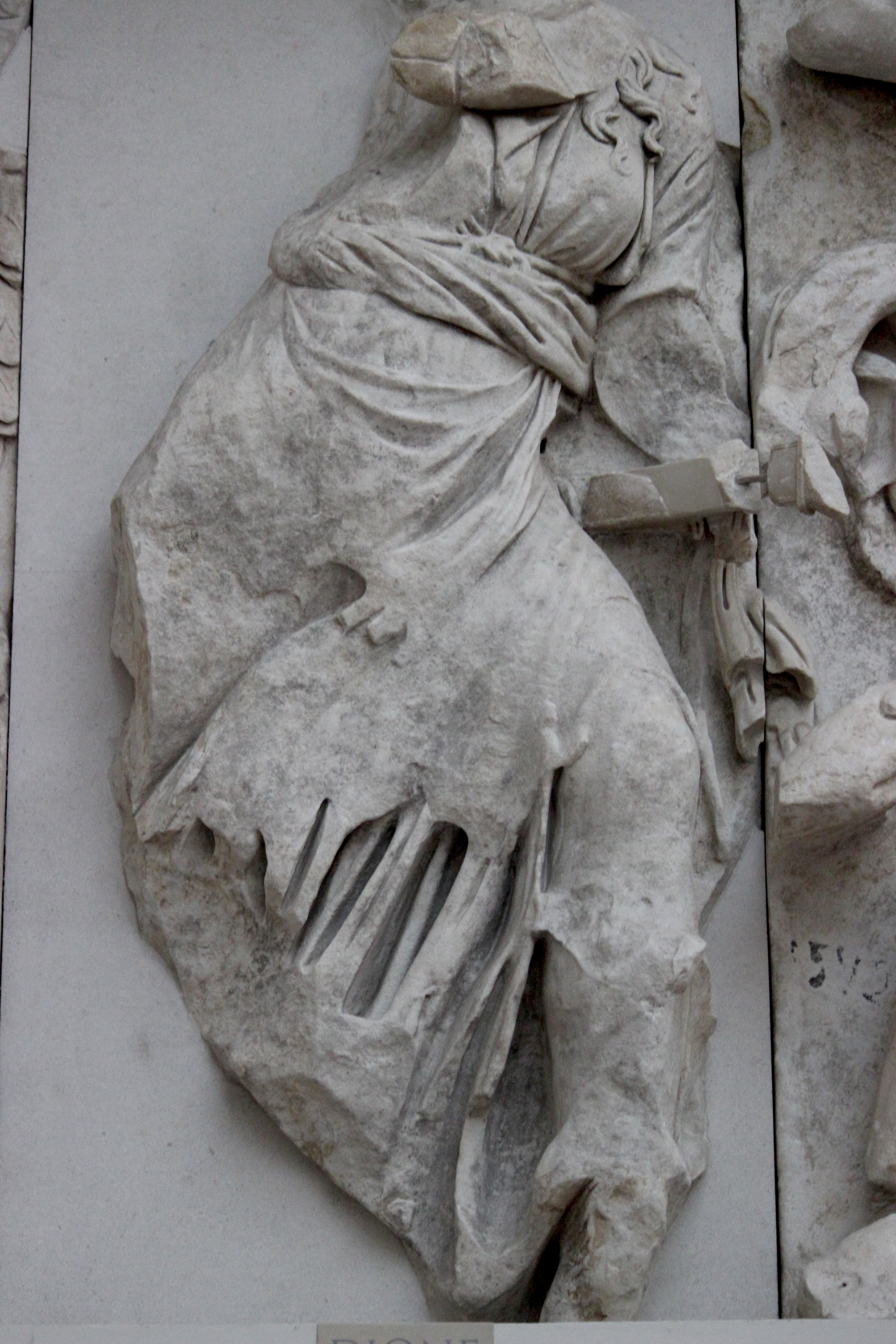
- Dione in the north frieze of the Pergamon Altar, Pergamon Museum in Berlin

Genealogy
- Parents: Oceanus or Uranus or Aether (father); Gaia or Tethys (mother)
- Siblings: Oceanids and river gods or Titans: Crius; Cronus; Coeus; Hyperion; Iapetus; Mnemosyne; Oceanus; Phoebe; Rhea; Theia; Themis; Tethys
- Consort: Zeus
- Children: Aphrodite

In ancient Greek religion and mythology, Dione (/daɪˈoʊniː/; Ancient Greek: Διώνη, romanized: Diṓnē, lit. 'she-Zeus') is an oracular goddess and Titaness. She is primarily known from Book V of Homer's Iliad, where she tends to the wounds suffered by her daughter Aphrodite. In myth, Dione is either presented as an Oceanid nymph—one of the daughters of Oceanus and Tethys—or the thirteenth Titan and a daughter of Gaia and Uranus.

== Name ==
Dione (Διώνη, Diṓnē, from an earlier form *Διϝωνᾱ Diwōnā) is essentially the feminine of the genitive form of Greek Ζεύς Zeús, that is, Διός Diós (from earlier Διϝός, Diwós), "of Zeus". Other goddesses were called by this name (see the Dione (mythology) article for more).

Due to being a daughter of Dione, Aphrodite was sometimes called "Dionaea" (Διωναίη Diōnaíē) and even "Dione".

Following the deciphering of Linear B by Ventris and Chadwick in the 1950s, a goddess named Di-u-ja was found in the tablets. This was considered to be a female counterpart of Zeus and identified with Dione by some scholars.

== Family ==
According to Homer, Dione is a goddess living in Olympus and the mother of Aphrodite by Zeus. He does not elaborate on Zeus and Dione's relationship, or the exact events that resulted in Aphrodite's birth. Likewise there is no mention of Dione's own lineage. Several centuries later, the mythographer Apollodorus makes Dione the thirteenth Titan, child of Gaia (the Earth) and Uranus (the Sky). He also mentions a Nereid Dione, daughter of Nereus and Doris. Apollodorus also makes Dione the mother of Aphrodite by Zeus but clearly describes her as one of the god's adulterous partners and not a previous wife.

Homer contemporary Hesiod on the other hand does not include Dione among his list of Titans in the Theogony, nor makes her the mother of Aphrodite; in his account, Aphrodite is born from the genitals of Uranus that fell into the sea after his castration at the hands of his son Cronus. He does include a Dione among his list of the 3,000 Oceanids, the daughters of Oceanus and Tethys.

Meanwhile, Roman author Hyginus in the Fabulae lists Dione among the children of Terra (the Earth, equivalent to Gaia) and Aether.

The 5th-century grammarian Hesychius of Alexandria described Dione as the mother of Dionysus (usually the son of Semele) in her entry from his Alphabetical Collection of All Words. This is separately supported by one of the scholiasts on Pindar.

== Mythology ==
In Book V of the Iliad, during the last year of the Trojan War, Aphrodite attempts to save her son Aeneas from the rampaging Greek hero Diomedes as she had previously saved her favorite Paris from his duel with Menelaus in Book III. Enraged, Diomedes chases her and drives his spear into her hand between the wrist and palm. Escorted by Iris to Ares, she borrows his horses and returns to Olympus. Dione consoles her with other examples of gods wounded by mortals – Ares bound by the Aloadae and Hera and Hades shot by Heracles – and notes that Diomedes is risking his life by fighting against the gods. Dione then heals her wounds and Zeus, while admonishing her to leave the battlefield, calls her daughter.

Dione's only other active role in myth is in the birth of the god Apollo, a son of Zeus. After Leto finally found a place to rest and give birth, she suffered for nine days the agonising pangs of childbirth. With her were the "all the chiefest of the goddesses" (save for Hera, who was responsible for the prolonged labor); Dione along with Rhea, Ichnaea, Themis, and Amphitrite, and other deathless goddesses as well, until Apollo was finally born, causing the goddesses present to raise a cry.

== Worship ==
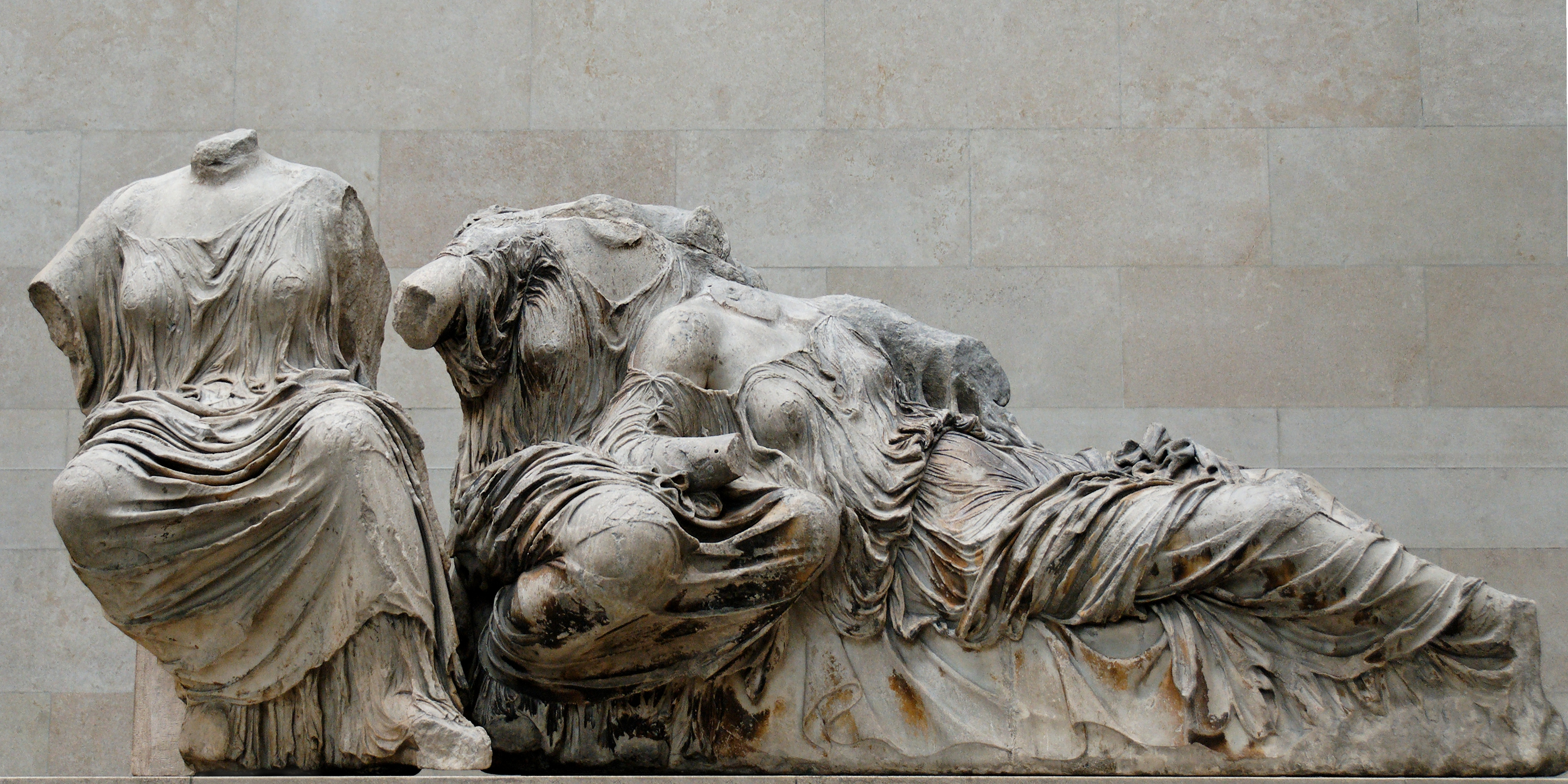
Three goddesses from the Parthenon's east pediment, possibly Hestia, Dione and Aphrodite; c. 435 BC, British Museum.

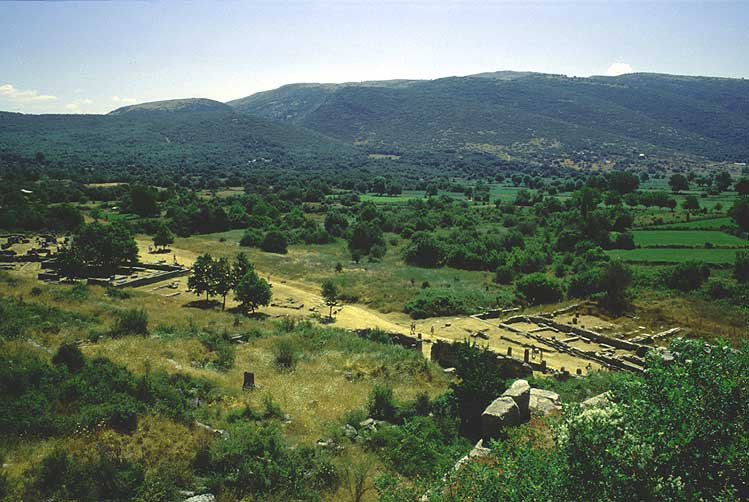
The sanctuary of Dodona from the theater.

By the time of Strabo (the first century BC), Dione was worshiped at a sacred grove near Lepreon on the west coast of the Peloponnesus. She was also worshiped as a consort at the temples of Zeus, particularly his oracle at Dodona (perhaps the original, Indo-European consort of Zeus). Herodotus called this the oldest oracle in Greece and recorded two related accounts of its founding: the priests at Thebes in Egypt told him that two priestesses had been taken by Phoenician pirates, one to Libya and the other to Dodona and continued their earlier rites; the priestesses of Dodona claimed that two black doves had flown to Libya and Dodona and commanded the creation of oracles to Zeus. Homer and Herodotus both make Zeus the principal deity of the site, but some scholars propose Dodona originally served as a cult center of an earth goddess.

In the 2nd-century BC sculptural frieze of the Great Altar of Pergamum, Dione is inscribed in the cornice directly above her name and figures in the eastern third of the north frieze, among the Olympian family of Aphrodite. This placement – making her the offspring of Gaia and Uranus – is Homeric and contradicts the theory put forth by Erika Simon that the altar's organization was Hesiodic. Dione's possible appearance in the east pediment of the Parthenon would likewise place her among the children of Gaia and Uranus.

Apollodorus of Athens described "Dione" as a regional epithet of Hera in Dodona.

== See also ==
- Dyeus, the reconstructed sky deity of the Proto-Indo-European pantheon and etymological origin of Zeus and Dione.

== Bibliography ==
- Burkert, Walter (2005). "Chapter Twenty: Near Eastern Connections". In Foley, John Miles (ed.). A Companion to Ancient Epic. New York and London: Blackwell Publishing. ISBN 978-1-4051-0524-8..
- Homer, The Iliad with an English Translation by A.T. Murray, PhD in two volumes, Cambridge, MA., Harvard University Press; London, William Heinemann, 1924, Online version at the Perseus Digital Library.
- Hesiod, Theogony, in The Homeric Hymns and Homerica with an English Translation by Hugh G. Evelyn-White, Cambridge, Massachusetts, Harvard University Press; London, William Heinemann, 1914, Online version at the Perseus Digital Library.
- Evelyn-White, Hugh, The Homeric Hymns and Homerica with an English Translation by Hugh G. Evelyn-White, Homeric Hymns, Cambridge, Massachusetts, Harvard University Press; London, William Heinemann, 1914.
- Euripides, The Complete Greek Drama', edited by Whitney J. Oates and Eugene O'Neill, Jr. in two volumes, 2, Helen, translated by E. P. Coleridge, New York, Random House, 1938.
- Strabo, The Geography of Strabo, Edition by H.L. Jones, Cambridge, Massachusetts, Harvard University Press; London, William Heinemann, 1924, Online version at the Perseus Digital Library.
- Apollodorus, Apollodorus, The Library, with an English Translation by Sir James George Frazer, F.B.A., F.R.S. in 2 Volumes, Cambridge, Massachusetts, Harvard University Press; London, William Heinemann, 1921, Online version at the Perseus Digital Library.
- Hyginus, Gaius Julius, The Myths of Hyginus, edited and translated by Mary A. Grant, Lawrence, University Press of Kansas, 1960.
