= Clymene (wife of Iapetus) =

Oceanid nymph and wife of Iapetus in Greek mythology

- Member of the Oceanids
- Other names: Asia
- Abode: Ocean

Genealogy
- Parents: Oceanus and Tethys
- Siblings: the Oceanids, the river gods
- Consort: Iapetus
- Children: Prometheus, Epimetheus, Atlas, Menoetius

In Greek mythology, Clymene or Klymene (Ancient Greek: Κλυμένη, romanized: Kluménē, lit. 'fame'; feminine form of Κλύμενος; pronounced /ˈklɪmɪniː/, /ˈklaɪ-/, KLIM-uh-nee or KLY-muh-nee) is the name of one of the three thousand Oceanid nymphs, usually the wife of Iapetus and mother by him of Prometheus, Epimetheus, Atlas and Menoetius.

== Mythology ==
Clymene is the daughter of the Titans Oceanus and Tethys. She married her uncle Iapetus and became by him the mother of Prometheus, Epimetheus, Atlas and Menoetius. Other authors relate the same of her sister Asia. A less common genealogy makes Clymene the wife of Prometheus and the mother of Deucalion by him. She may also be the Clymene referred to as the mother of Mnemosyne by Zeus. In some myths, Clymene was one of the nymphs in the train of Cyrene.

Although she shares name and parentage with Clymene, one of Helios's lovers, who is also a daughter of Oceanus and Tethys (and thus one of her sisters and fellow Oceanid), she is distinguished from her.

== Genealogy ==
Clymene's family tree

Uranus	Gaia	Pontus
Oceanus	Tethys	Hyperion	Theia	Crius	Eurybia
The Rivers	The Oceanids	Helios	Selene	Eos	Astraeus	Pallas	Perses
Cronus	Rhea	Coeus	Phoebe
Hestia	Hera	Hades	Zeus	Leto	Asteria
Demeter	Poseidon
Iapetus	CLYMENE (or Asia)	Mnemosyne	(Zeus)	Themis
Atlas	Menoetius	Prometheus	Epimetheus	The Muses	The Horae

== See also ==
- Electra
- Perse
- Pleione

== Bibliography ==
- Apollodorus, Gods & Heroes of the Greeks: The Library of Apollodorus, Michael Simpson (translator), The University of Massachusetts Press, (1976). ISBN 0870232053.
- Apollodorus, The Library with an English Translation by Sir James George Frazer, F.B.A., F.R.S. in 2 Volumes, Cambridge, MA, Harvard University Press; London, William Heinemann Ltd. 1921. ISBN 0-674-99135-4. Online version at the Perseus Digital Library. Greek text available from the same website.
- Hesiod, Theogony, in The Homeric Hymns and Homerica with an English Translation by Hugh G. Evelyn-White, Cambridge, MA., Harvard University Press; London, William Heinemann Ltd. 1914. Online version at the Perseus Digital Library.
- Hyginus, Gaius Julius, The Myths of Hyginus. Edited and translated by Mary A. Grant, Lawrence: University of Kansas Press, 1960.
- Gantz, Timothy, Early Greek Myth: A Guide to Literary and Artistic Sources, Johns Hopkins University Press, 1996, Two volumes: ISBN 978-0-8018-5360-9 (Vol. 1), ISBN 978-0-8018-5362-3 (Vol. 2).
- Hard, Robin, The Routledge Handbook of Greek Mythology: Based on H.J. Rose's "Handbook of Greek Mythology", Psychology Press, 2004, ISBN 9780415186360. Google Books.
