= Epimetheus =

Brother of Atlas, Menoetius and Prometheus

- Titan who embodies afterthought
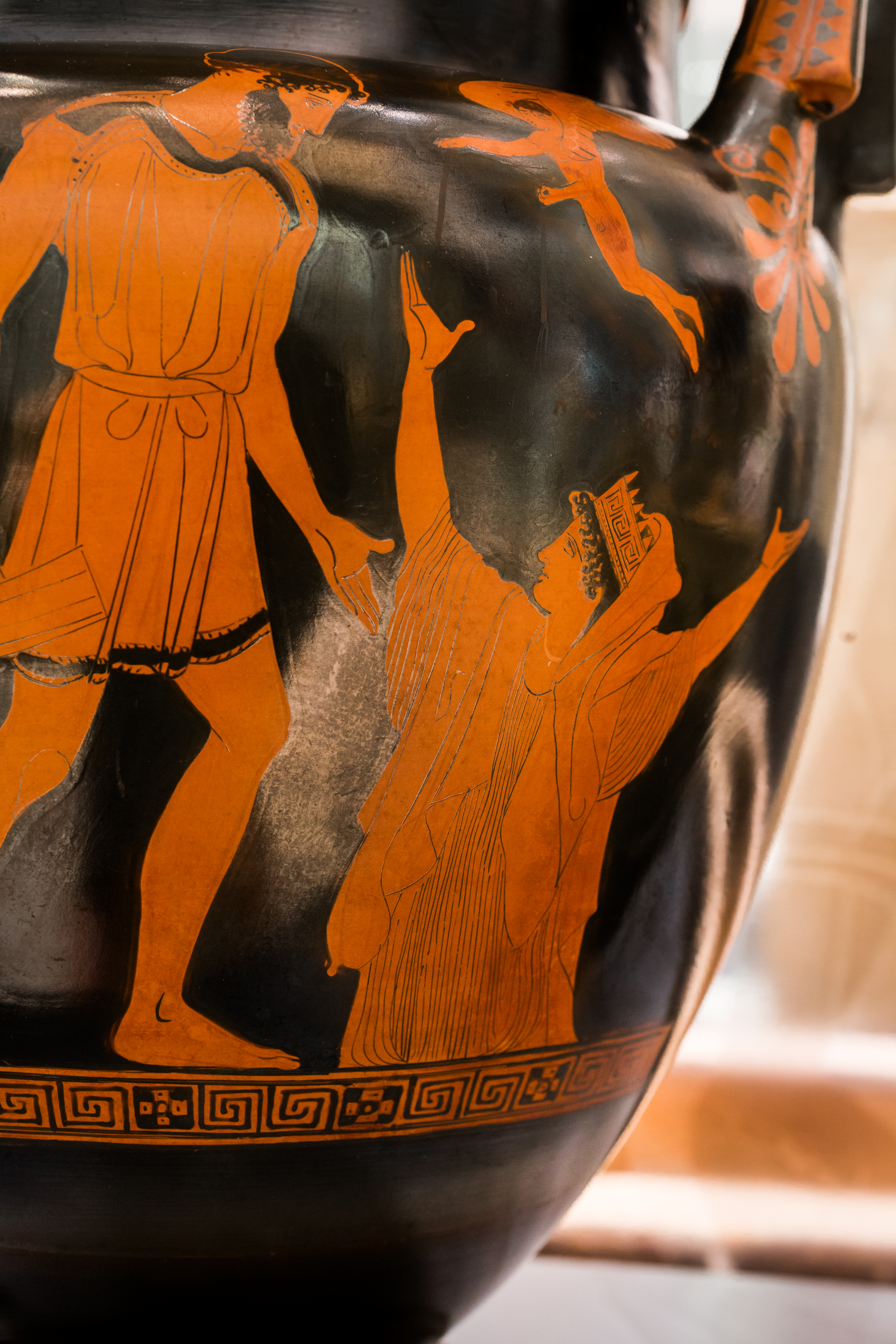
- Epimetheus receiving Pandora rising from the earth, Attic red-figure volute-krater c. 450 BC in the Ashmolean Museum

Genealogy
- Parents: Iapetus and Clymene
- Siblings: Prometheus, Menoetius, Atlas
- Consort: Pandora
- Children: Prophasis, Pyrrha

In Greek mythology, Epimetheus (/ɛpɪˈmiːθiəs/; Ancient Greek: Ἐπιμηθεύς, lit. 'afterthought') is the brother of Prometheus, with the complementary pair serving as archetypal representations of humankind. Both are sons of the Titan Iapetus; while Prometheus ("forethought, or foresight") is portrayed as ingeniously clever, Epimetheus ("afterthought, or hindsight") is considered inept and foolish. In some accounts of the myth, Epimetheus unleashes the unforeseen troubles in Pandora's box.

According to Plato's rendition of an origin myth, Epimetheus and Prometheus were entrusted with distributing the traits among the newly-created animals. Epimetheus was responsible for giving a positive trait to every animal, but when it was time to give man a positive trait, lacking foresight, he found that there was nothing left to give.

== Mythology ==
According to Plato's use of the old myth in his Protagoras (320d–322a), the two Titan brothers were entrusted with distributing the traits among the newly created animals. Epimetheus was responsible for giving a positive trait to every animal, but when it was time to give man a positive trait, lacking foresight, he found that there was nothing left. Prometheus decided that humankind's attributes would be the civilising arts and fire, which he stole from Athena and Hephaestus. Prometheus later stood trial for his crime. In the context of Plato's dialogue, "Epimetheus, the being in whom thought follows production, represents nature in the sense of materialism, according to which thought comes later than thoughtless bodies and their thoughtless motions."

According to Hesiod, who related the tale twice (Theogony, 527ff; Works and Days 57ff), Epimetheus was the one who accepted the gift of Pandora from the gods. Their marriage may be inferred (and was by later authors), but it is not made explicit in either text. In later myths, the daughter of Epimetheus and Pandora was Pyrrha, who married Deucalion, a descendant of Prometheus. Together they are the only two humans who survived the deluge. In some accounts, Epimetheus had another daughter, Metameleia, whose name means "regret of what has occurred" for those that do not plan ahead will only feel sorrow when calamity strikes. According to a scholion (marginal comment) on Apollonius of Rhodes's Argonautica, states that Epimetheus' wife was called Ephyra, daughter of Oceanus and Tethys while Stephanus' account recounts that she was the daughter of Myrmex. In the fifth of Pindar's Pythian Odes, Epimetheus is called the father of Prophasis.

== In modern culture ==
In his seminal book Psychological Types, in Chapter X, "General description of the types", Carl Jung uses the image of Epimetheus (with direct reference to Carl Spitteler's Epimetheus) to refer to the false application of a mental function, as opposed to its whole, healthy, and creative use.

== Genealogy ==
Epimetheus's family tree

Uranus	Gaia	Pontus
Oceanus	Tethys	Hyperion	Theia	Crius	Eurybia
The Rivers	The Oceanids	Helios	Selene	Eos	Astraeus	Pallas	Perses
Cronus	Rhea	Coeus	Phoebe
Hestia	Hera	Hades	Zeus	Leto	Asteria
Demeter	Poseidon
Iapetus	Clymene (or Asia)	Mnemosyne	(Zeus)	Themis
Atlas	Menoetius	Prometheus	EPIMETHEUS	The Muses	The Horae
