= Asia (Oceanid) =

Oceanid of Greek mythology

- Member of the Oceanids

Genealogy
- Parents: Oceanus (father); Tethys (mother)
- Siblings: Oceanids, the river gods
- Consort: Iapetus
- Children: Atlas, Epimetheus, Menoetius, Prometheus

In Greek mythology, Asia (Ancient Greek: Ἀσία or Ἀσίη, romanized: Asía, lit. 'land of the sunrise' or 'rising up') was one of the 3,000 Oceanids, daughters of the Titans Oceanus and his sister-spouse Tethys. In some accounts, her mother was called Pompholyge and sister of Libye.

== Family ==
According to Apollodorus, Asia was the wife of the Titan Iapetus, and mother of Atlas, Prometheus, Epimetheus and Menoetius although Hesiod gave the name of another Oceanid, Clymene, as their mother.

It is possible that the name Asia became preferred over Hesiod's Clymene to avoid confusion with the Clymene who was mother of Phaethon by Helios in some accounts and must have been perceived as a distinct figure. Herodotus recorded the tradition that the continent Asia was named after Asia whom he called wife of Prometheus rather than mother of Prometheus, perhaps here a simple error rather than genuine variant tradition. Both Acusilaus and Aeschylus in his Prometheus Bound called Prometheus' wife Hesione.

Herodotus also related a Lydian tradition "that Asia was not named after Prometheus' wife Asia, but after Asies, the son of Cotys, who was the son of Manes, and that from him the Asiad clan at Sardis also takes its name".

== Genealogy ==
Asia's family tree

Uranus	Gaia	Pontus
Oceanus	Tethys	Hyperion	Theia	Crius	Eurybia
The Rivers	The Oceanids	Helios	Selene	Eos	Astraeus	Pallas	Perses
Cronus	Rhea	Coeus	Phoebe
Hestia	Hera	Hades	Zeus	Leto	Asteria
Demeter	Poseidon
Iapetus	ASIA (or Clymene)	Mnemosyne	(Zeus)	Themis
Atlas	Menoetius	Prometheus	Epimetheus	The Muses	The Horae

== See also ==
- Asia's name etymology
- 67 Asia
