= Iapetus =

Titan in Greek mythology

- Member of the Titans
- Abode: Tartarus
- Battles: Titanomachy

Genealogy
- Parents: Uranus and Gaia
- Siblings: Titans: Coeus; Crius; Cronus; Hyperion; Oceanus; Mnemosyne; Phoebe; Rhea; Tethys; Theia; Themis; Hekatonkheires: Briareos; Cottus; Gyges; Cyclopes: Arges; Brontes; Steropes; Other siblings: Gigantes; Erinyes (the Furies); Meliae
- Consort: Asia or Clymene
- Offspring: Atlas, Prometheus, Epimetheus, Menoetius, Anchiale, Buphagus

In Greek mythology, Iapetus or Iapetos (/aɪˈæpɪtəs/; eye-AP-ih-təs; Ancient Greek: Ἰαπετός, romanized: Iapetós), also Japetus or Japetos, was one of the Titans, the son of Uranus (Sky) and Gaia (Earth) and father of Atlas, Prometheus, Epimetheus, and Menoetius. He was also called the father of Buphagus and Anchiale in other sources.

Iapetus was linked to Japheth (Hebrew: יֶפֶת), one of the sons of Noah and a progenitor of mankind in biblical accounts. The practice by early historians and biblical scholars of identifying various historical nations and ethnic groups as descendants of Japheth, together with the similarity of their names, led to a fusion of their identities, from the early modern period to the present.

== Mythology ==
Iapetus is the one Titan mentioned by Homer in the Iliad as being in Tartarus with Cronus. He is a brother of Cronus, who ruled the world during the Golden Age but is now locked up in Tartarus along with Iapetus.

Iapetus's wife is usually described as a daughter of Oceanus and Tethys named either Clymene (according to Hesiod and Hyginus) or Asia (according to Apollodorus).

In Hesiod's Works and Days, Prometheus is addressed as "son of Iapetus", and no mother is named. However, in Hesiod's Theogony, Clymene is listed as Iapetus's wife and the mother of Prometheus. In Aeschylus's play Prometheus Bound, Prometheus is son of the goddess Themis with no father named (but still with at least Atlas as a brother). However, in Horace's Odes, in Ode 1.3 Horace writes "audax Iapeti genus ... Ignem fraude mala gentibus intulit" ("The bold offspring of Iapetus [i.e. Prometheus] ... brought fire to peoples by wicked deceit").

Hesiod and other Greek scholars regarded the sons of Iapetus as mankind's ancestors and as such, some of humanity's worst qualities were said to have been inherited from these four gods, each of whom was punished by Zeus for a particular moral fault. "High-towering Menoetius, the embodiment of arrogance, insolence and overweening pride, he hurls to the nethermost of Tartarus. Prometheus, who uses his high intelligence for purposes of deception, he makes the victim of an ever growing conscience symbolized by the onsets of a voracious vulture. To Epimetheus, the personification of stupidity that refuses to be instructed, he presents all the ills of Pandora's box. To Atlas, patient, enduring Atlas who is devoid of self-assertion, he assigns the task of holding up the heavens, on the outskirts of the world, -- the zero of occupations."

Iapetus as the progenitor of mankind has been equated with Japheth (יֶפֶת), the son of Noah, based on the similarity of their names and the tradition, reported by Josephus (Antiquities of the Jews), which made Japheth the ancestor of the "Japhetites", i.e. the peoples of Europe. Iapetus has been linked to Japheth by John Pairman Brown and Bruce Louden.

== Genealogy ==
Iapetus's family tree

Uranus	Gaia	Pontus
Oceanus	Tethys	Hyperion	Theia	Crius	Eurybia
The Rivers	The Oceanids	Helios	Selene	Eos	Astraeus	Pallas	Perses
Cronus	Rhea	Coeus	Phoebe
Hestia	Hera	Hades	Zeus	Leto	Asteria
Demeter	Poseidon
IAPETUS	Clymene (or Asia)	Mnemosyne	(Zeus)	Themis
Atlas	Menoetius	Prometheus	Epimetheus	The Muses	The Horae
