= Perses (brother of Aeetes) =

Colchian king in Greek mythology

- King of Colchis

King of Colchis
- Predecessor: Aeëtes
- Successor: Medus
- Wife: None
- Issue: Hecate (rationalized account, not the goddess)
- Father: Helios or other
- Mother: Perse

In Greek mythology, Perses (/ˈpɜːrsiz/; Ancient Greek: Πέρσης, romanized: Pérsēs, lit. 'destroyer or Persian') is a son of Helios, the god of the Sun, and the Oceanid nymph Perse. Perses was the brother of Aeëtes, king of the mythical Aea and keeper of the Golden Fleece. After the theft of the fleece by Jason, Perses usurped his brother and dethroned him until Aeëtes' daughter Medea returned to Aea and killed him.

== Etymology ==
His name is connected to either the Ancient Greek word perthō (πέρθω – "to sack", "to ravage", "to destroy"), or from the word for Persian, from Ancient Greek 'Persís' Περσίς.

== Family ==
As the son of Helios and Perse in many accounts, Perses would be the full brother of Aeëtes and Circe, and sometimes Pasiphaë (whose mother is occasionally Crete instead), and of Aloeus (whose only surviving mentions are in Eumelus' Corinthiaca).

Unlike his siblings, Perses was not mentioned in earlier sources like Hesiod's Theogony (which only lists Aeëtes and Circe as Helios and Perse's children) nor Apollonius Rhodius' Argonautica. Rather, most of the sources mentioning him are Roman. In Valerius Flaccus' Argonautica, Perses is a brother of Aeëtes only on his mother's side, his father being unknown.

== Mythology ==
Perses' brother Aeëtes had been warned by an oracle that great peril would come to him if the Golden Fleece was ever removed from Colchis. Indeed, after Medea helped Jason steal the fleece, Perses usurped the throne of Colchis from his brother, but was subsequently slain by Medea, his paternal niece, who restored her father to the throne, as an oracle had once predicted that he would be slain by his own kin.

One tale goes that after Perses seized power, Medea's son Medus (by either her second husband Aegeus or Jason himself) arrived in Colchis and was imprisoned immediately, though under a false identity. Soon after a famine broke out. Medea arrived in Colchis too, claiming to be a priestess of Artemis, and unknowingly, betrayed her son's true identity to Perses. Medea, under the pretext of simply wanting to talk to him, secretly gave Medus a sword, and explained what had happened to his grandfather Aeëtes. Medus then slew Perses.

Although distinct from the Titan known as Perses, who is only known for fathering Hecate the goddess of witchcraft, Diodorus Siculus in his Bibliotheca historica made this Perses the father of a witch-priestess sharing some traits and the name of this goddess, (Note: Diodorus' account is a rationalising one, where the supernatural and divine elements of the myths are explained as mundane events or mere misunderstandings, hence Hecate is presented as not a goddess but a mortal druggist.) by an unknown mother; Perses' brother Aeëtes then married this Hecate and had Medea and Circe by her. Diodorus describes Perses as "exceedingly cruel" and "lawless".

Regnal titles
Preceded by Aeetes	King of Colchis	Succeeded by Medus

== Genealogy ==
Perses's family tree

Gaia
Uranus
Hyperion	Theia	Oceanus	Tethys
Helios	Perse
Circe	Aeëtes	Pasiphaë	PERSES	Aloeus

== See also ==
- Cassiphone
- Pelias
