= Buphagus (mythology) =

Arcadian hero in Greek mythology

In Greek mythology, Buphagus (Ancient Greek: Βουφάγος), son of Iapetus and Thornax, was an Arcadian hero and husband of Promne. He received the wounded Iphicles, the brother of Heracles, into his house, and took care of him until he died. Buphagus was later killed by Artemis on Mount Pholoe for committing an "unholy sin against her godhead".

Buphagus (which means bull, cattle-eater) was also a surname of Heracles, Lepreus, and others, who were believed to have eaten a whole bull at once.
