= Theia =

Goddess of sight in Greek mythology

- Member of the Titans
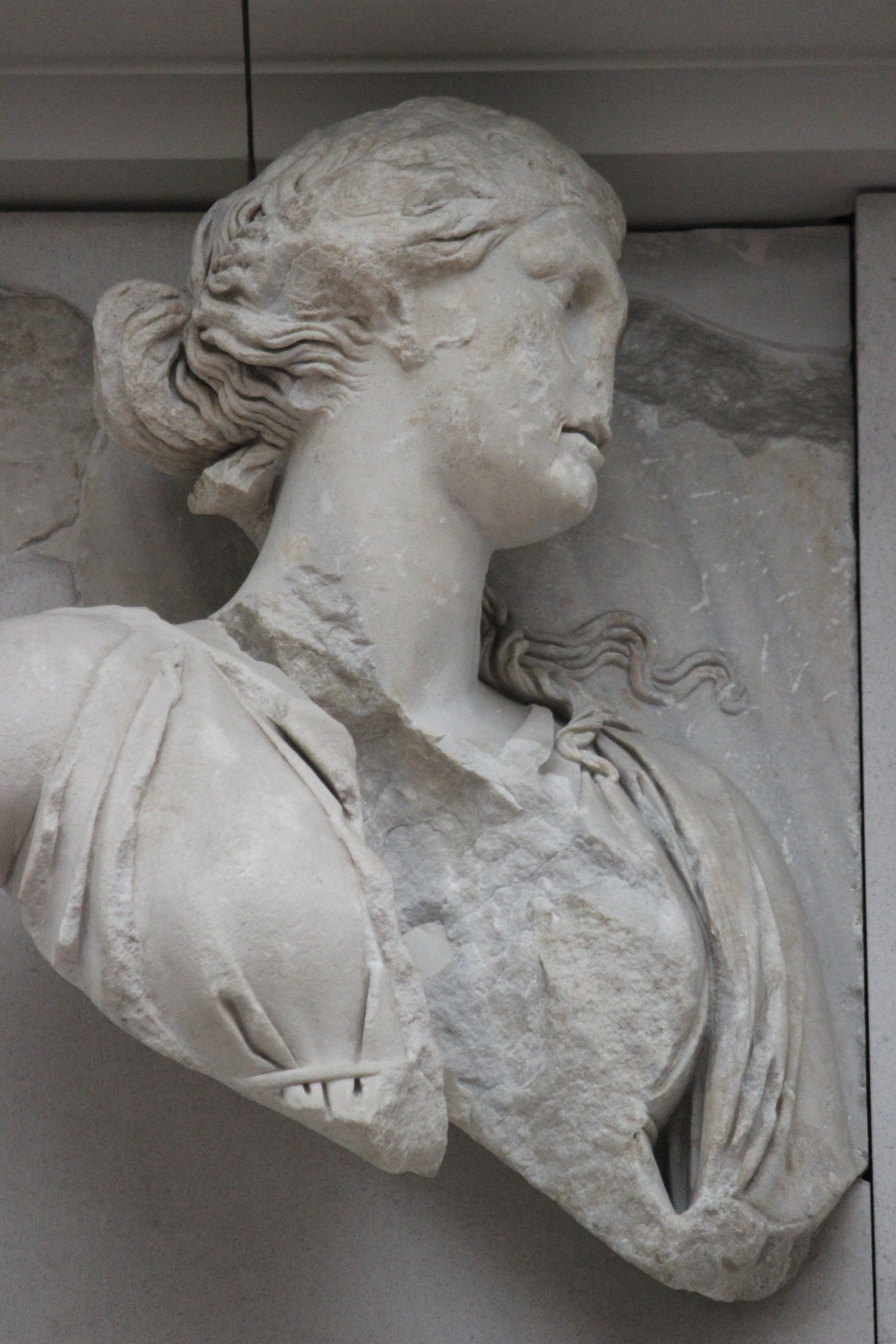
- In the frieze of the Great Altar of Pergamon (Berlin), the goddess who fights at Helios's back is conjectured to be Theia
- Other names: Euryphaessa, Aethra, Basileia
- Ancient Greek: Θεία
- Abode: Sky

Genealogy
- Parents: Uranus and Gaia
- Siblings: Titans: Crius; Cronus; Coeus; Dione; Hyperion; Iapetus; Mnemosyne; Oceanus; Phoebe; Rhea; Tethys; Themis; Hecatoncheires: Briareos; Cottus; Gyges; Cyclopes: Arges; Brontes; Steropes
- Consort: Hyperion
- Offspring: Helios, Selene, Eos

In Greek mythology, Theia (/ˈθiːə/; Ancient Greek: Θεία, romanized: Theía, lit. 'divine') also called Thea, Thia, Euryphaessa, Aethra or Basileia, was one of the Titans, the children of Uranus (Sky) and Gaia (Earth).

Her brother-husband is Hyperion, a god of the light, and together they are the parents of Helios (the Sun), Selene (the Moon), and Eos (the Dawn). She seems to be the same figure as Aethra, who is the wife of Hyperion and mother of his children in some accounts. Like her husband, Theia features scarcely in myth, being mostly important for the children she bore, though she appears in some texts and rare traditions.

== Etymology ==
The name Theia alone (feminine form of θεῖος, theîos, "divine") is originally but an epithet; the proper name Euryphaessa (Εὐρυφάεσσα) is composed from the adjective εὐρύς, eurýs, "wide" and the noun φάος, pháos, "light".

== Family ==
Early accounts gave her a primal origin, said to be the eldest daughter of Gaia (Earth) and Uranus (Sky). She is thus the sister of the Titans (Oceanus, Crius, Hyperion, Iapetus, Coeus, Themis, Rhea, Phoebe, Tethys, Mnemosyne, Cronus, and sometimes of Dione), the Cyclopes, the Hecatoncheires, the Giants, the Meliae, the Erinyes, and is the half-sister of Aphrodite (in some versions), Typhon, Python, Pontus, Thaumas, Phorcys, Nereus, Eurybia, and Ceto. By her brother-husband Hyperion, she is the mother of Helios, Selene, and Eos.

Robert Graves relates that Theia is referred to as the cow-eyed Euryphaessa who gave birth to Helios in myths dating to classical antiquity.

== Mythology ==
Once paired in later myths with her Titan brother Hyperion as her husband, "mild-eyed Euryphaessa, the far-shining one" of the Homeric Hymn to Helios, was said to be the mother of Helios (the Sun), Selene (the Moon), and Eos (the Dawn). Gaius Valerius Catullus described those three lights of the heavens as "Theia's illustrious progeny" in the sixty-sixth of his carmina.

Pindar praises Theia in his Fifth Isthmian ode:

Mother of the Sun, Theia of many names, for your sake men honor gold as more powerful than anything else; and through the value you bestow on them, O queen, ships contending on the sea and yoked teams of horses in swift-whirling contests become marvels.

She seems here a goddess of glittering in particular and of glory in general, but Pindar's allusion to her as "Theia of many names" is telling, since it suggests assimilation, referring not only to similar mother-of-the-sun goddesses such as Phoebe and Leto, but perhaps also to more universalizing mother-figures such as Rhea and Cybele. Furthermore, a scholium on those lines wrote ἐκ Θείας καὶ Ὑπερίονος ὁ Ἥλιος, ἐκ δὲ Ἡλίου ὁ χρυσός, "The Sun came from Theia and Hyperion, and from the Sun came gold", denoting a special connection of Theia, the goddess of sight and brilliance, with gold as the mother of Helios the sun. Theia was regarded as the goddess from which all light proceeded.

Plutarch recorded a fable-like story, The Moon and her Mother (which is sometimes categorized as an Aesopic fable), where Theia's daughter Selene asked her mother to weave her a garment to fit her measure; the mother, who goes unnamed, then replied that she was unable to do so, as Selene kept changing shape and size, sometimes full, then crescent-shaped and others yet half her size, never staying the same.

According to sixth century BC lyric poet Stesichorus, Theia lives with her son in his palace. In the east Gigantomachy frieze of the Pergamon Altar, the figure of the goddess preserved fighting a youthful giant next to Helios is conjectured to be his mother Theia.

=== Diodorus's account ===
An unorthodox version of the myth presented by Diodorus identified Theia as Basileia, meaning 'queen'. In this account Basileia was the eldest daughter of king Uranus, who excelled in prudence and rearer her own brothers, earning the epithet 'Great Mother' from them. She succeeded her father to the throne, and took her brother Hyperion to husband in order to produce heirs. With him Basileia had two children, Helios and Selene, both admired for their beauty and chastity. But Basileia and Hyperion's other brothers grew envious of their happiness and feared Hyperion would try to seize all the royal power for himself, so they killed Hyperion and threw Helios into the Eridanus river, where he drowned. When Selene discovered that, she threw herself off the roof.

Basileia meanwhile searched all over the river for her son's body, and fatigued she fell asleep. Helios then appeared to her in a vision and urged her to cease her mourning, for the brothers would have the punishment they deserved, while he and his sister "would be transformed, by some divine providence, into immortal natures," so that what known as the "holy fire" in the heavens would now be called Helios ("the Sun"), while "Mene" would be Selene ("the Moon"). When she woke up she recounted the dream and her woes to the common crowd that had gathered, asking them to give her dead loved ones the same honours as they did to gods. Then a frenzy overtook her and she grabbed her daughter's playthings and began to wander over the land. When she passed from sight, the people did as told and erected altars to her, and would pound kettledrums and cymbals to honour her.

== Theia in the sciences ==
Theia's mythological role as the mother of the Moon goddess Selene is alluded to in the application of the name to a hypothetical planet that, according to the giant impact hypothesis, collided with the Earth and created the Moon.

Theia's alternate name Euryphaessa has been adopted for a species of Australian leafhoppers Dayus euryphaessa (Kirkaldy, 1907).

A Theia figure has been found at the Necropolis of Cyrene.

== Genealogy ==
Theia's family tree, according to Hesiod's Theogony

Uranus	Gaia	Pontus
Oceanus	Tethys	Hyperion	THEIA	Crius	Eurybia
The Rivers	The Oceanids	Helios	Selene	Eos	Astraeus	Pallas	Perses
Cronus	Rhea	Coeus	Phoebe
Hestia	Hera	Hades	Zeus	Leto	Asteria
Demeter	Poseidon
Iapetus	Clymene (or Asia)	Mnemosyne	(Zeus)	Themis
Atlas	Menoetius	Prometheus	Epimetheus	The Muses	The Horae

== See also ==
- List of light deities
- Theia in popular culture
- Greek mythology in popular culture
