= Perse (mythology) =

Oceanid nymph and wife of Helios in Greek mythology

- Member of the Oceanids
- Abode: Ocean

Genealogy
- Parents: Oceanus and Tethys
- Siblings: Oceanids, the river gods
- Consort: Helios
- Children: Circe, Aeëtes, Perses, Aloeus, Pasiphaë

In Greek mythology, Perse (Ancient Greek: Πέρση, romanized: Pérsē, lit. 'destroyer') or Perseis (Περσηίς, Persēís) is one of the 3,000 Oceanids, fresh water-nymph daughters of the Titans Oceanus and Tethys. Perse married Helios, the god of the Sun, and bore him several children, most notably Circe, the sorceress-goddess of Aeaea.

== Family ==
In the Theogony, an ancient Greek epic poem about the genealogy of the gods, Hesiod included Perse in his list of the 3,000 Oceanids, water-nymphs and daughters of two Titans, Oceanus and Tethys. Homer also made Perse a child of Oceanus.

== Mythology ==
Perse was one of the wives of the sun god, Helios. According to Homer and Hesiod, with Helios she had Circe and Aeëtes, with later authors also mentioning their children Pasiphaë, Perses, Aloeus, and even Calypso, who is however more commonly the daughter of Atlas. It is not clear why Perse bore Helios, the source of all light, such dark and mysterious children.

When Aphrodite cursed Helios to fall in love with the mortal princess Leucothoe, he is said to have forgotten about Perse and all his other past lovers. She seems to have been linked to witchcraft and knowledge of herbs and potions, much like her daughter Circe. She might have also been associated with the witchcraft goddess Hecate, who was also called Perseis (as in "daughter of Perses") as a mortal priestess of Artemis by the name Hecate is listed as Circe's mother in Diodorus Siculus' account.

== Possible connections ==
Perseis' name has been linked to Περσίς (Persís), "female Persian", and πέρθω (pérthō), "destroy" or "slay" or "plunder".

Kerenyi also noted the connection between her and Hecate due to their names, denoting a chthonic aspect of the nymph, as well as that of Persephone, whose name "can be taken to be a longer, perhaps simply a more ceremonious, form of Perse", as did Fowler, who noted that the pairing made sense given Hecate's association with the Moon. It has been suggested that Hecate's "Perseis" epithet denotes lunar connections. However, as Mooney notes, there is no evidence that Perse was ever a moon goddess on her own right.

An inscription of Mycenaean Greek (written in Linear B) was found on a tablet from Pylos, dating back to 1400–1200 BC. John Chadwick reconstructed (Note: The actual word in Linear B is 𐀟𐀩𐁚, pe-re-*82 or pe-re-swa; it is found on the PY Tn 316 tablet.) the name of a goddess, *Preswa who could be identified with Perse. Chadwick found speculative the further identification with the first element of Persephone.

== Genealogy ==
Perse's family tree

Gaia
Uranus
Hyperion	Theia	Oceanus	Tethys
Helios	PERSE
Circe	Aeëtes	Pasiphaë	Perses	Aloeus

== See also ==
Other nymphs and magic-related figures in Greek mythology:

- Medea
- Perimede
- Neaera
- List of Oceanids
- List of Mycenaean deities
