= Prophasis =

Personification of excuse in Greek mythology

In Greek mythology, Prophasis (Ancient Greek: Πρόφασις) was the personification of excuse. According to Pindar, she was the daughter of Epimetheus.
