= Aeëtes =

Greek mythical character

- King of Colchis
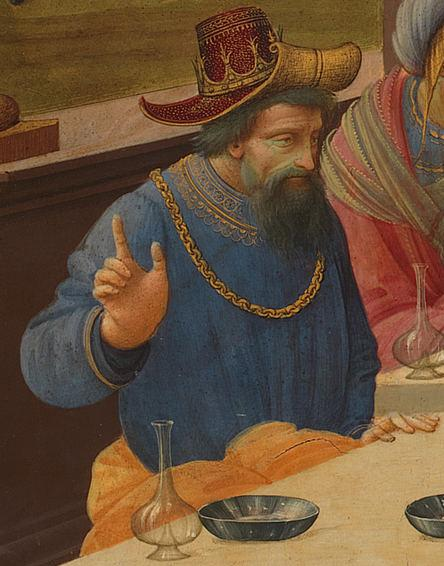
- King Aeëtes by Bartolomeo di Giovanni
- Abode: Colchis

Genealogy
- Parents: Helios and Perseis
- Siblings: Circe, Pasiphaë, Aloeus, Perses, Phaethon, the Heliades, the Heliadae and others
- Consort: (1) Idyia, (2) Asterodeia, (3) Neaera, (4) Clytia, (5) Ipsia or Eurylyte
- Offspring: Medea, Absyrtus, and Chalciope

Aeëtes (/iːˈiːtiːz/ ee-EE-teez; Ancient Greek: Αἰήτης, romanized: Aiḗtēs, IPA: [ai̯.ɛ̌ːtɛːs]), or Aeeta, was the ruler of the eponymous realm of Aea in Greek mythology, a wondrous realm which from the fifth century B.C.E. onward became identified with the kingdom of Colchis east in the Black Sea. The name comes from the ancient Greek word αἰετός (aietós, "eagle").

== Family ==
Aeëtes was the son of Sun god Helios and the Oceanid Perseis, full brother of Circe and Aloeus, either full or half brother of Pasiphaë and Perses and father of Medea, Chalciope and Absyrtus. His consort was either (1) Idyia, the youngest daughter of Oceanus, (2) Asterodeia, a Caucasian Oceanid, (3) the Nereid Neaera, (4) Clytia, (5) Ipsia or Eurylyte.

According to a partially rationalized account of the myths mentioned by Diodorus Siculus and Dionysius Scytobrachion, he was the brother or half brother of Perses, a king of Tauris, husband of Perses' daughter Hecate (a mortal version of the goddess), and father of Circe, Medea, Aegialeus. This account describes Aeëtes, Perses, Hecate and Circe as "exceedingly cruel", with Hecate being the murderess of her father Perses and explicitly an evil influence on her (already cruel) husband Aeëtes, while Circe learned witchcraft from her mother but soon exceeded her skills. Meanwhile, this version of Medea describes her as well learned and under the protection of Helios, using her knowledge for purposes opposite to her parents' interest (for helping people rather than harming them).

One version of the myth, makes Aeëtes a native of Corinth and son of Ephyra, an Oceanid, or else of a certain Antiope. Asterope was also one of the possible mothers of Aeëtes. (For a comparative table of Aeëtes' family, see below).

== Mythology ==
=== Foundation of Colchis ===
Pausanias states that, according to the poet Eumelos, Aeëtes was the son of Helios (from northern Peloponnesus) and brother of Aloeus. Helios divided the land he ruled, and he gave Aloeus the part in Asopia (see Asopus) and Aeëtes the part of Ephyra (Corinth). Later, Aeëtes gave his kingdom to Bounos, a son of Hermes and Alkidameia, and went to Colchis, a country in western Caucasus. When Bounos died, Epopeus, a son of Aloeus who ruled in Asopia, became king of Ephyra too. Aeëtes built a new colony in Colchis, near the mouth of the large river Phasis, and called it Aea.

=== Flight of two siblings ===
Phrixus, son of Athamas and Nephele, along with his twin, Helle, were hated by their stepmother, Ino. Ino hatched a devious plot to get rid of the twins, roasting all the town's crop seeds so they would not grow. The local farmers, frightened of famine, asked a nearby oracle for assistance. Ino bribed the men sent to the oracle to lie and tell the others that the oracle required the sacrifice of Phrixus but before they were able to kill him, Phrixus and Helle were rescued by a golden ram sent by Nephele, their natural mother. Helle fell off the ram into the Hellespont (which was named after her) and died, but Phrixus survived all the way to Colchis, where Aeëtes took him in and treated him kindly, giving Phrixus his daughter Chalciope in marriage. In gratitude, Phrixus gave the king the golden fleece of the ram, which Aeëtes hung on a tree in his kingdom. Aeëtes dedicated the golden fleece to Ares. Phrixus thus lived at the court of Aeëtes for a long time. In Hyginus' account, one day Aeëtes learned from an oracle that he would die at the hands of a descendant of Aeolus and so he killed Phryxus. His sons, on the other hand, managed to return to Orchomenus.

=== The Argonauts ===
Some time later, Jason arrived to claim the fleece as his own. Aeëtes promised to give it to him only if he could perform certain tasks. First, Jason had to plow a field with fire-breathing oxen that he had to yoke himself. Then, Jason sowed into a field the teeth of a dragon which the Colchian king received from Athena, half of it was sowed before by Cadmus in Thebes. These teeth sprouted into an army of warriors. Jason was quick-thinking, however, and before they attacked him, he threw a rock into the crowd. Unable to determine whence the rock had come, the soldiers killed each other. Jason then ran away. Medea fled, too. Aeëtes pursued them in his own ship as they fled, but Medea distracted her father by killing and dismembering her brother, Absyrtus, and throwing pieces of his cadaver overboard. Aeëtes paused to gather the pieces of his son, and thus Jason and Medea escaped.

== Historicity ==
The mythical Aeëtes may have reflected a memory of a historical personage. His name recurs in historical narratives of Classical authors who claim the enduring legacy of Aeëtes in Colchis. Arrian, touring the region in the 2nd century, reports seeing sites and ruins from Aeëtes' time. The 5th-century author Zosimus mentions "a palace of Aeëtes" standing at the mouth of the Phasis. Local rulers are claimed to have descended from Aeëtes, such as a king of the Phasians from Xenophon's Anabasis and Saulaces, a gold-rich king of Colchis, from Pliny the Elder's Naturalis Historia. Strabo, who treated Aeëtes as a historical person, writes that this was "a local name among the Colchians". The name of Aeëtes was borne by a historical Colchian, a 6th-century nobleman in Lazica in the times of Lazic War known from Agathias's account. If naming Aeëtes as the ancestor of the Colchian rulers was not the invention of the classical authors, it is possible that the Colchian rulers regarded themselves as descendants of Aeëtes.

== Family table ==
Comparative table of Aeëtes' family
Relation	Name	Source																					
Relation	Name	Epim.	Hom.	Hesiod		Naup.	Soph.	Pindar	Apollon			Dio.	Cic.	Diop.	Ovid	Str.	Val.	Apol.	Hyginus		Ael.	Paus.	Orph.
Relation	Name	Epim.	Odys.	Theo.	Frag.	Naup.	Scyth.	Sch. Oly.	Arg.		Sch.	Dio.	Cic.	Diop.	Met.	Str.	Val.	Apol.	Fab.	Sch.	Ael.	Paus.	Arg.
Parentage	Helios and Ephyra	✓									✓												
Parentage	Helios and Perseis		✓	✓					✓				✓					✓	✓				
Parentage	Helios and Antiope							✓			✓			✓									
Parentage	Helios and Asterope																						✓
Parentage	Helios											✓					✓						
Full siblings	Circe		✓	✓					✓				✓			✓		✓	✓				✓
Full siblings	Pasiphae												✓					✓	✓				
Full siblings	Perses											✓						✓	✓				
Full siblings	Aloeus																					✓	
Consort	Idyia			✓					✓				✓					✓	✓				
Consort	Asterodia									✓				✓									
Consort	Neaera						✓																
Consort	Hecate											✓											
Consort	Clytia																		✓				
Consort	Eurylyte					✓																	
Consort	Unnamed										✓										✓		
Children	Medea			✓			✓	✓	✓			✓	✓	✓	✓	✓	✓	✓	✓		✓		✓
Children	Chalciope or								✓								✓	✓	✓				✓
Children	Iophossa				✓						✓												
Children	Absyrtus / Apsyrtus or					✓	✓			✓			✓	✓		✓	✓	✓			✓		✓
Children	Aegialeus											✓	✓										
Children	Circe											✓											

== Notes ==
Regnal titles
New creation	King of Colchis	Succeeded by Perses
