= Phoebe (Titaness) =

Greek goddess identified with Diana

- Goddess of intellect and prophecy
- Member of the Titans
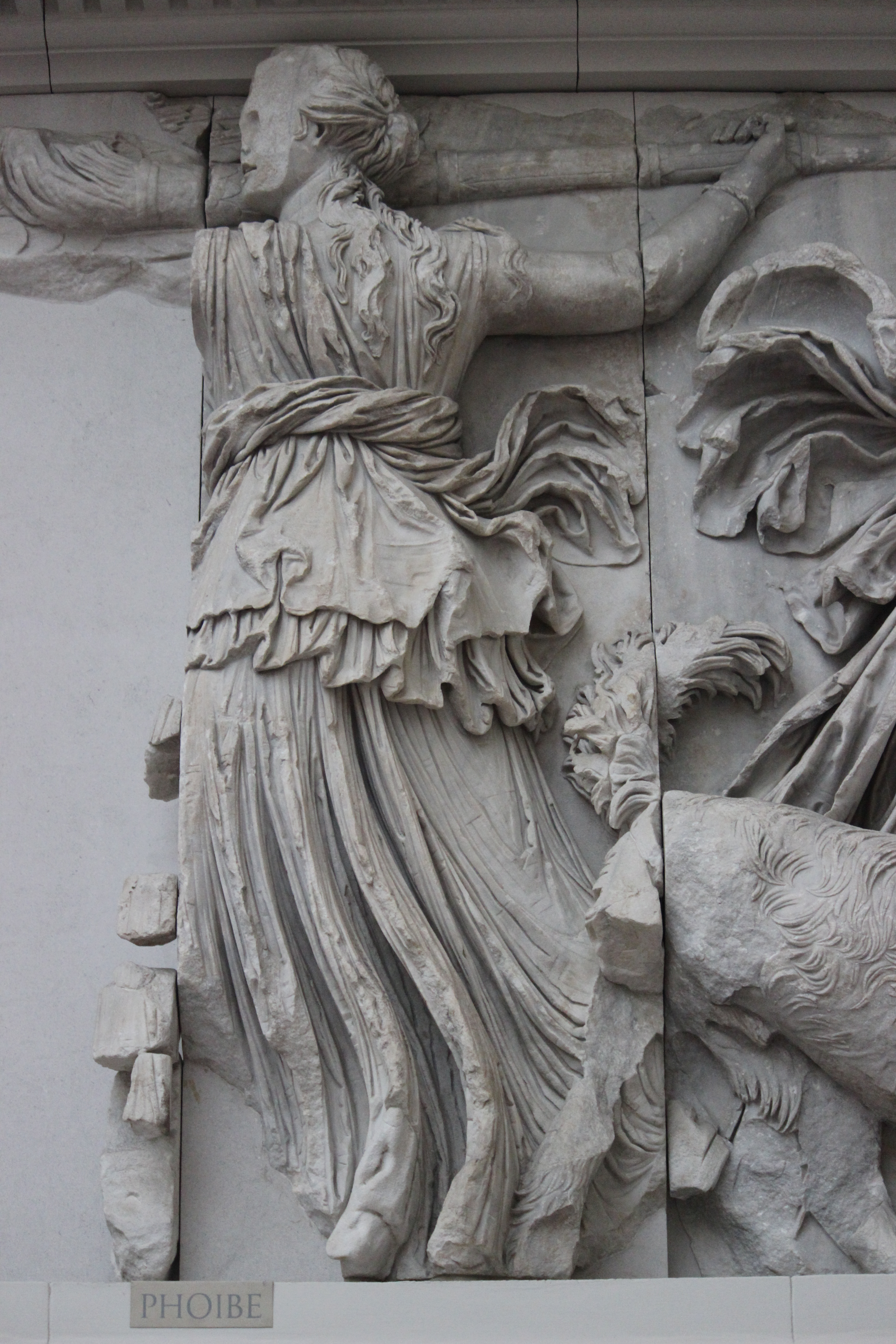
- Phoebe fighting against the Giants with her daughter Asteria on the Gigantomachy Frieze from the Pergamon Altar, Berlin.

Genealogy
- Parents: Uranus and Gaia
- Siblings: Cyclopes, Hecatoncheires, Titans
- Consort: Coeus
- Offspring: Leto, Asteria

In ancient Greek religion and mythology, Phoebe (/ˈfiːbi/ FEE-bee; Ancient Greek: Φοίβη, romanized: Phoíbê, lit. 'bright', Ancient Greek pronunciation: [ˈp^{h}oi̯.bεː]) was one of the Titans, the children of Uranus (Sky) and Gaia (Earth). She is a goddess of intellect and prophecy. With her brother and husband Coeus she had two daughters, Leto and Asteria. She is thus the grandmother of Apollo, Artemis and Hecate.

According to the myth, she was the original owner of the site of the Oracle of Delphi before she gave it to her grandson Apollo. Her name, meaning 'bright', was also given to a number of lunar goddesses like Artemis and later the Roman goddesses Luna and Diana. Phoebe herself was not actively seen as a moon goddess in her own right in ancient religion or mythology.

== Etymology ==
The Greek name Φοίβη Phoíbē is the feminine form of Φοῖβος Phoîbos meaning "pure, bright, radiant", an epithet given to Apollo as a sun-god. Phoebe was also an epithet of Artemis as a moon-goddess. Due to Apollo's role in myth, the name additionally came to mean "prophet", giving words like φοιβάζω phoibázō "to prophesy". As an adjective, it was also used to refer to "clear, pure" water.

== Family ==
Phoebe is a Titaness, one of the twelve (or thirteen) divine children born to Uranus (Sky) and Gaia (Earth). Phoebe's consort was her brother Coeus, with whom she had two daughters, first Leto, who bore Apollo and Artemis, and then Asteria, a star goddess who bore an only daughter, Hecate.

== Attributes ==
Through Leto, Phoebe was the grandmother of Apollo and Artemis. The names Phoebe and Phoebus (masculine) came to be applied as synonyms for Artemis/Diana and Apollo respectively, as well as for Luna and Sol, the lunar goddess and the solar god, by the Roman poets; the late-antiquity grammarian Servius writes that "Phoebe is Luna, like Phoebus is Sol."

Phoebe was, like Artemis, identified by Roman poets with the Roman moon goddess Diana. Phoebe means "bright" but is functionally only a name; in mythology, the role of moon goddess is fulfilled by other deities as her grandchildren inherit her name. Because of this Apollo is sometimes known as "Phoebus Apollo".

Hesiod in the Theogony describes Phoebe as "χρυσοστέφανος" (khrysostéphanos, meaning "golden-crowned").

== Mythology ==
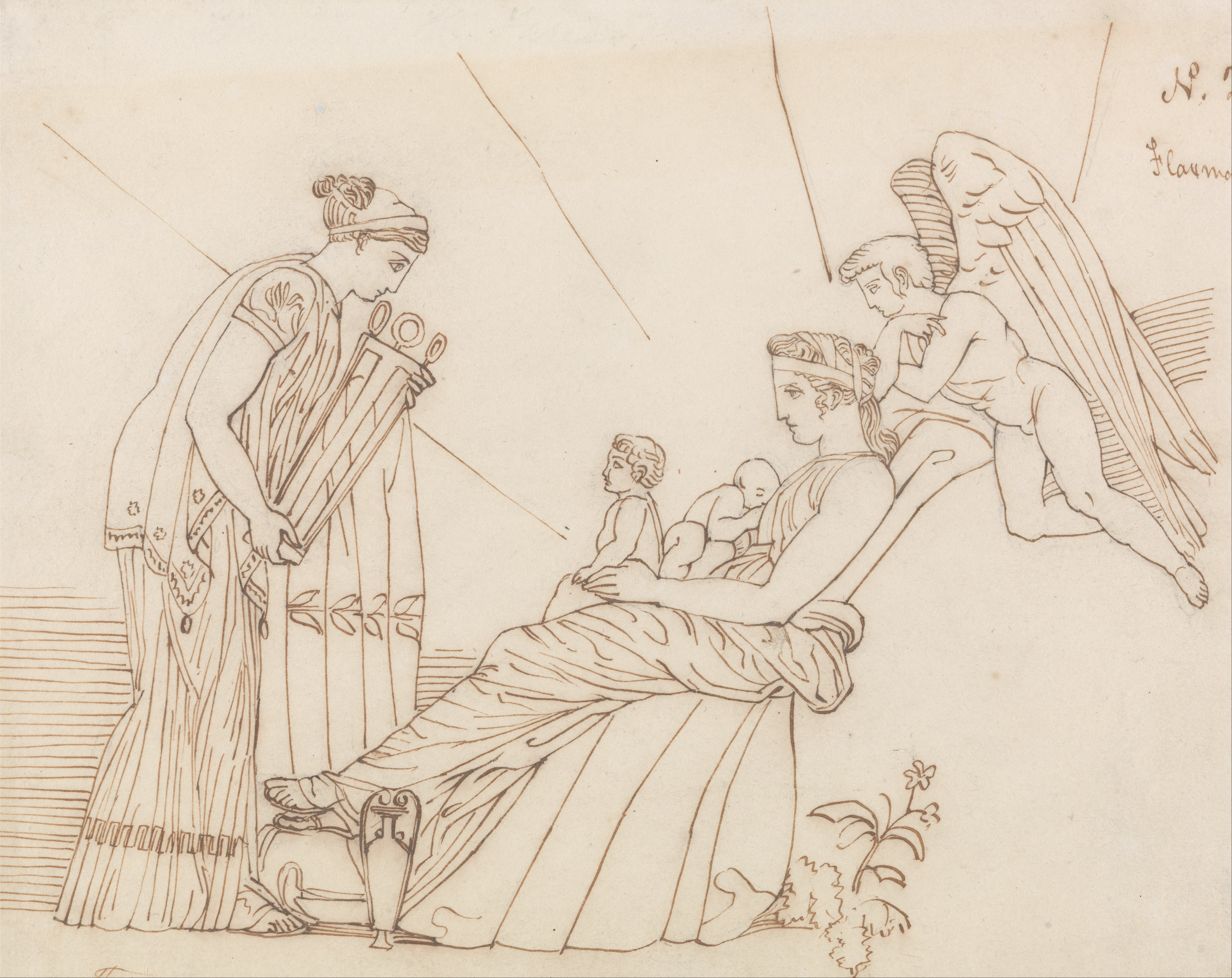
Phoebe gifts the oracular tripod to Apollo, engraving by John Flaxman.

According to a speech that Aeschylus puts into the mouth of the Delphic priestess herself in the play The Eumenides, Phoebe received control of the Oracle at Delphi from her sister Themis, who herself had received it from their mother Gaia, and then passed it along with her name on to Apollo, her grandson, as a gift for his birthday.

D. S. Robertson noted "Phoebe in this succession seems to be his private invention," reasoning that in the three great allotments of oracular powers at Delphi, corresponding to the three generations of the gods, "Ouranos, as was fitting, gave the oracle to his wife Gaia and Kronos appropriately allotted it to his sister Themis." Robertson also speculates that in Zeus' turn to make the gift, Aeschylus could not report that the oracle was given directly to Apollo, who had not yet been born, and thus Phoebe was interposed. These supposed male delegations of the powers at Delphi as expressed by Aeschylus are not borne out by the usual modern reconstruction of the sacred site's pre-Olympian history.

== Iconography ==
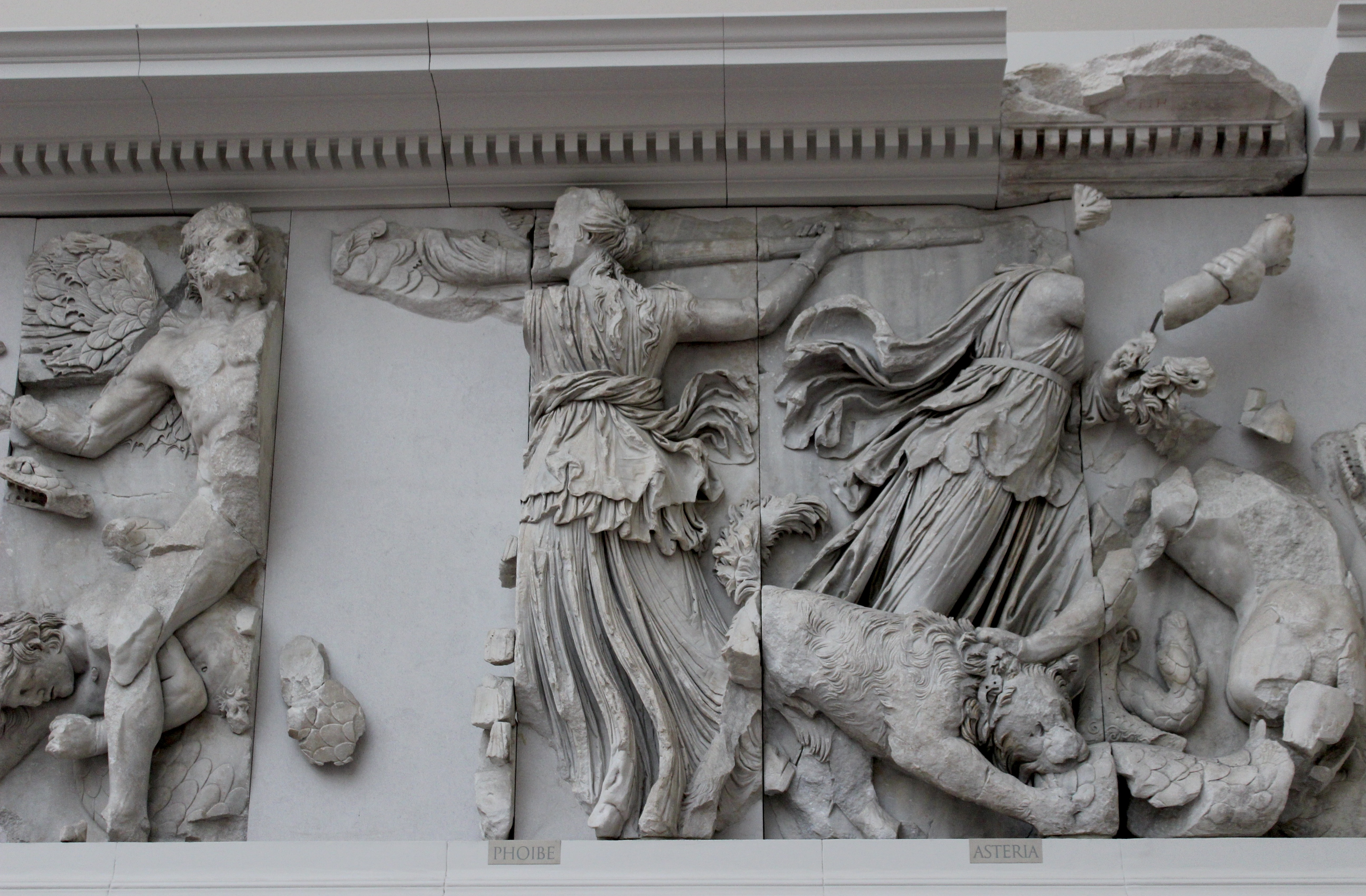
Phoebe and Asteria fighting Giants on the Pergamon Altar.

Due to her minimal presence in both mythology and religion, Phoebe was traditionally not depicted in ancient Greek or Roman art, so she has no distinct iconography. Nevertheless, Phoebe appears on the southeast corner of the Pergamon Altar which depicts the Gigantomachy, fighting against a Giant with animal features, similar to the one her daughter Leto is fighting. Phoebe, wearing a diadem and a very creased dress, is seen wielding a flaming torch and fighting next to her other daughter Asteria.

== Legacy ==
Phoebe, one of the moons of Saturn is named after this goddess, as the sister of Cronus, Saturn's Greek equivalent. Phoebe (also spelled Phebe) is also a popular feminine given name in the English-speaking world.

== Genealogy ==
Phoebe's family tree

Uranus	Gaia	Pontus
Oceanus	Tethys	Hyperion	Theia	Crius	Eurybia
The Rivers	The Oceanids	Helios	Selene	Eos	Astraeus	Pallas	Perses
Cronus	Rhea	Coeus	PHOEBE
Hestia	Hera	Poseidon	Zeus	Leto	Asteria
Demeter	Hades	Apollo	Artemis	Hecate
Iapetus	Clymene (or Asia)	Themis	(Zeus)	Mnemosyne
Atlas	Menoetius	Prometheus	Epimetheus	The Horae	The Muses

== See also ==
- Dione
- Cassandra
- Crius
- Dodona
