= Hyperion (Titan) =

Solar god in Greek mythology

- Member of the Titans
- Ancient Greek: Ὑπερίων
- Planet: Sun
- Battles: Titanomachy
- Parents: Uranus and Gaia
- Consort: Theia
- Offspring: Helios, Eos and Selene

In Greek mythology, Hyperion (/haɪˈpɪəriən/; Ancient Greek: Ὑπερίων, romanized: Hyperiōn, [hy.pe.rǐː.ɔːn]) was one of the Titans, the children of Uranus (Sky) and Gaia (Earth). With his sister, the Titaness Theia, Hyperion fathered Helios (Sun), Selene (Moon) and Eos (Dawn).

Hyperion was, along with his son Helios, a personification of the sun, with which the two are sometimes identified. John Keats's abandoned epic poem Hyperion is among the literary works that feature the figure.

== Etymology ==
"Hyperion" derives from the Ancient Greek preposition ὑπέρ (hypér) "above"; the name thus roughly translates to "the one above". In Homer it is often joined with "Helios" in the fashion of an epithet. There is a possible attestation of his name in Linear B (Mycenaean Greek) in the lacunose form ]pe-rjo-[ (Linear B: ]𐀟𐁊[), found on the KN E 842 tablet (reconstructed [u]-pe-rjo-[ne]) though it has also been suggested that the name might actually read "Apollo" ([a]-pe-rjo-[ne]).

== Mythology ==
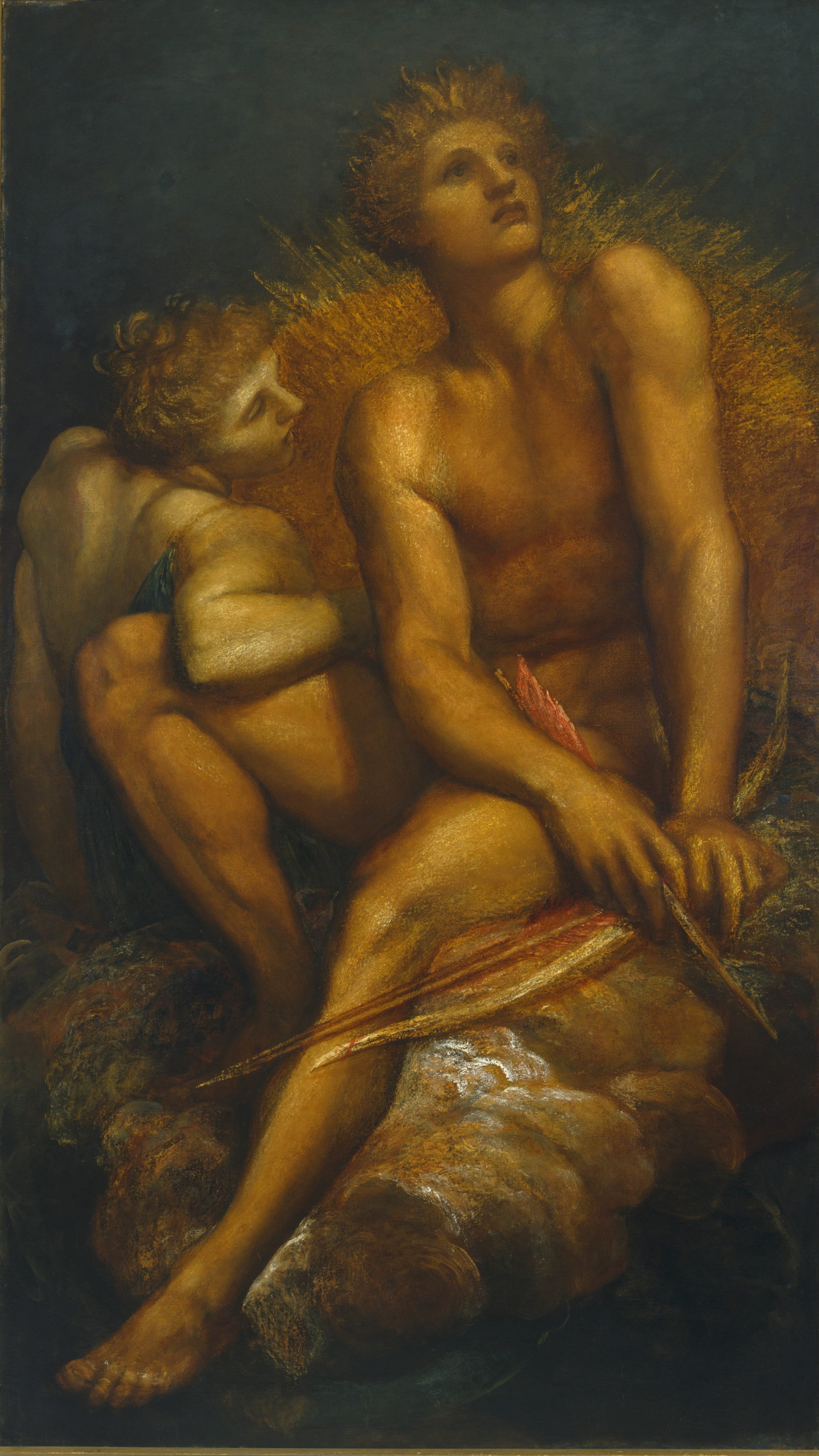
Artemis and Hyperion (George Frederic Watts c. 1881) — Artemis here represents the fading moon at dawn, and Hyperion the rising sun.

Hyperion is one of the twelve Titans, the children of Gaia and Uranus. In the Theogony, Uranus imprisoned all the children that Gaia bore him, before he was overthrown. According to Apollodorus, Uranus only imprisoned the Hecatoncheires and the Cyclopes but not the Titans, until Gaia persuaded her six Titan sons to overthrow their father Uranus and "they, all but Ocean, attacked him" as Cronus castrated him. Afterwards, in the words of Hesiod, Hyperion subjected his sister Theia to his love, and fathered three children with her, who became the lights of heaven: Helios (Sun), Selene (Moon), and Eos (Dawn). As is the case for most of the Titans, there are no myths or functions for Hyperion. He seems to exist only to provide a father for the three celestial deities. As a Titan, one of the oldest generation of gods, Hyperion was a fitting father for these three sky-gods who, as elements of the natural world, must have been conceived of as having come into being near the beginning of the cosmos.

=== Helios ===
Hyperion and Helios were both sun-gods. Early sources sometimes present the two as distinct personages, with Hyperion being the father of Helios, but sometimes they were apparently identified, with "Hyperion" being simply a title of, or another name for, Helios himself. Hyperion is Helios' father in Homer's Odyssey, Hesiod's Theogony, and the Homeric Hymn to Demeter. But in the Iliad and elsewhere in the Odyssey, Helios is also called "Helios Hyperion" with "Hyperion" here being used either as a patronymic or as an other epithet. In the Homeric epics, and in the Homeric Hymn to Apollo, besides being called "Helios", Hyperion is sometimes also called simply "Hyperion". In later sources the two sun-gods are distinctly father and son. In literature, the sun is often referred to as "Hyperion's bright son."

=== Diodorus Siculus ===
According to the rationalizing historian Diodorus Siculus, Hyperion was the name of the first person to understand the movement of the sun and moon, and their effect on the seasons, and explains that, because of this, he was said to be their "father":

Of Hyperion we are told that he was the first to understand, by diligent attention and observation, the movement of both the sun and the moon and the other stars, and the seasons as well, in that they are caused by these bodies, and to make these facts known to others; and that for this reason he was called the father of these bodies, since he had begotten, so to speak, the speculation about them and their nature.

Diodorus also recorded an unorthodox version of the myth, in which Hyperion married his sister Basileia and had two children by her, Helios and Selene; their brothers, envious of their happy issue and fearful that Hyperion would divert the royal power to himself, conspired and killed Hyperion along with his two children (which then went on to transform into the sun and the moon), leaving Basileia in great distress.

== Genealogy ==
Hyperion's family tree, according to Hesiod's Theogony

Uranus | Gaia | Pontus
Oceanus | Tethys | HYPERION | Theia | Crius | Eurybia
The Rivers | The Oceanids | Helios | Selene | Eos | Astraeus | Pallas | Perses
Cronus | Rhea | Coeus | Phoebe
Hestia | Hera | Hades | Zeus | Leto | Asteria
Demeter | Poseidon
Iapetus | Clymene (or Asia) | Mnemosyne | (Zeus) | Themis
Atlas | Menoetius | Prometheus | Epimetheus | The Muses | The Horae

== See also ==
- List of solar deities
