= Coeus =

Ancient Greek Titan

- Member of the Titans
- Battles: Titanomachy
- Parents: Uranus and Gaia
- Consort: Phoebe
- Offspring: Leto, Asteria

In Greek mythology, Coeus (/ˈsiːəs/; Ancient Greek: Κοῖος, romanized: Koîos), also called Koios or Polus, was one of the Titans, the children of Uranus (Sky) and Gaia (Earth).

== Mythology ==
Coeus was an obscure figure, and like most of the Titans he played no active part in Greek mythology—he appears only in lists of Titans—but was primarily important for his descendants. With his sister, "shining" Phoebe, Coeus fathered two daughters, Leto and Asteria. Leto copulated with Zeus (the son of fellow Titans Cronus and Rhea) and bore Artemis and Apollo. Asteria became the mother of Hecate by Perses (son of fellow Titan Crius and half-sister Eurybia).

Along with the other Titans, Coeus was overthrown by Zeus and the other Olympians in the Titanomachy. Afterwards, he and all his brothers (sans Oceanus) were imprisoned in Tartarus by Zeus. Coeus, later overcome with madness, broke free from his bonds and attempted to escape his imprisonment, but was repelled by Cerberus.

Tacitus wrote that Coeus was the first inhabitant of the island of Kos, which claimed to be the birthplace of his daughter Leto. Coeus's name was modified from Κοῖος (Koîos) to Κῶιος (Kōios), leading to his association with the island.

Eventually Zeus freed the Titans, presumably including Coeus.

== Genealogy ==
Coeus's family tree

Uranus	Gaia	Pontus
Oceanus	Tethys	Hyperion	Theia	Crius	Eurybia
The Rivers	The Oceanids	Helios	Selene	Eos	Astraeus	Pallas	Perses
Cronus	Rhea	COEUS	Phoebe
Hestia	Hera	Poseidon	Zeus	Leto	Asteria
Demeter	Hades	Apollo	Artemis	Hecate
Iapetus	Clymene (or Asia)	Themis	(Zeus)	Mnemosyne
Atlas	Menoetius	Prometheus	Epimetheus	The Horae	The Muses
