= Asteria =

Daughter of the Titans Coeus and Phoebe

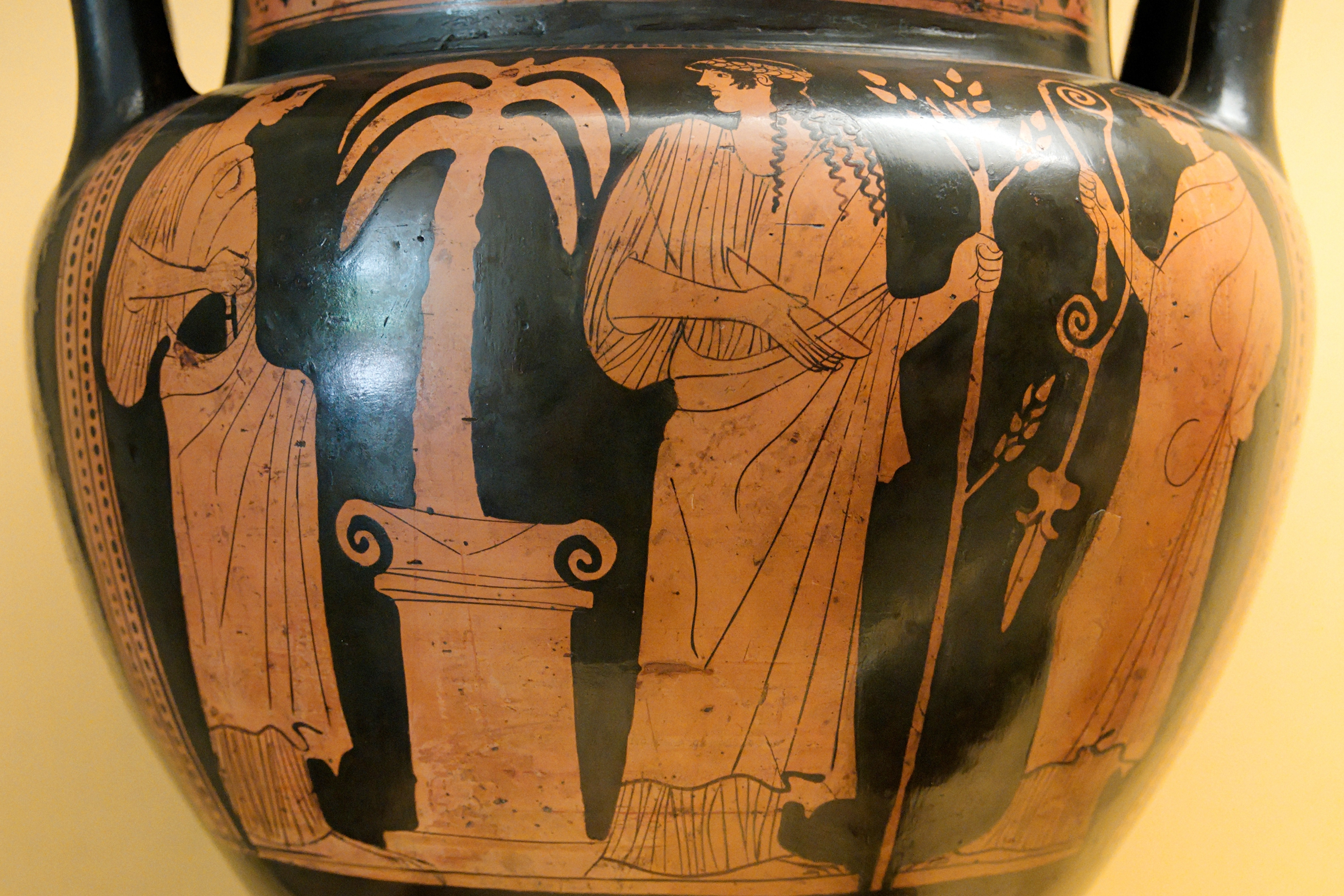
- Personification of Delos (right) with Artemis and Apollo, 450s BC Attic red-figure column krater in the National Museum of Archaeology
- Abode: Delos

Genealogy
- Parents: Coeus and Phoebe
- Siblings: Leto
- Consort: Perses
- Children: Hecate

In Greek mythology, Asteria or Asterie (/əˈstɪəriə/ as-TEAR-ee-ə; Ancient Greek: Ἀστερία or Ἀστερίη, romanized: Astería, Asteríē, lit. 'of the stars, starry one') is a daughter of the Titans Phoebe and Coeus (Polus) and the sister of Leto. According to Hesiod, by the Titan Perses she had a single child, a daughter named Hecate, the goddess of witchcraft. Other authors made Asteria the mother of the fourth Heracles and Hecate by Zeus.

Asteria is notable for her pursuit by the amorous god Zeus, who desired her. In order to escape him and his advances, she transformed herself into a bird and then a wandering island. When her sister Leto, impregnated by Zeus, went into labour, Asteria was the only place on earth willing to receive her, defying Hera's orders that forbade Leto any shelter. After Apollo and Artemis were born on her, the island received the name of Delos, and Apollo fixed it in place, making it his sacred land.

== Etymology ==
The goddess's name "Asteria" (Ancient Greek Ἀστερία, translit. Astería) is derived from the Greek word ἀστήρ (astḗr) meaning "star". Ἀστήρ itself is inherited from the Proto-Indo-European root *h₂ster- ("star"), from *h₂eh₁s-, "to burn". Asteria's name shares an etymology with the names of Astraeus, Asteria's first cousin, and his daughter Astraea.

== Family ==
All surviving sources make Asteria the daughter of the Titans Coeus and Phoebe, and the younger sister of Leto. According to Hesiod, before Cronus was dethroned and cast down by his six children, Asteria married Perses, one of her first cousins, who brought her to his house where she gave birth to their only child, a daughter named Hecate.

In one account attributed to Musaeus, Asteria is the mother of Hecate not by Perses but by Zeus himself. In this version Zeus kept Asteria as his paramour for some time before handing her over to Perses.

== Mythology ==
=== Zeus and Delos ===
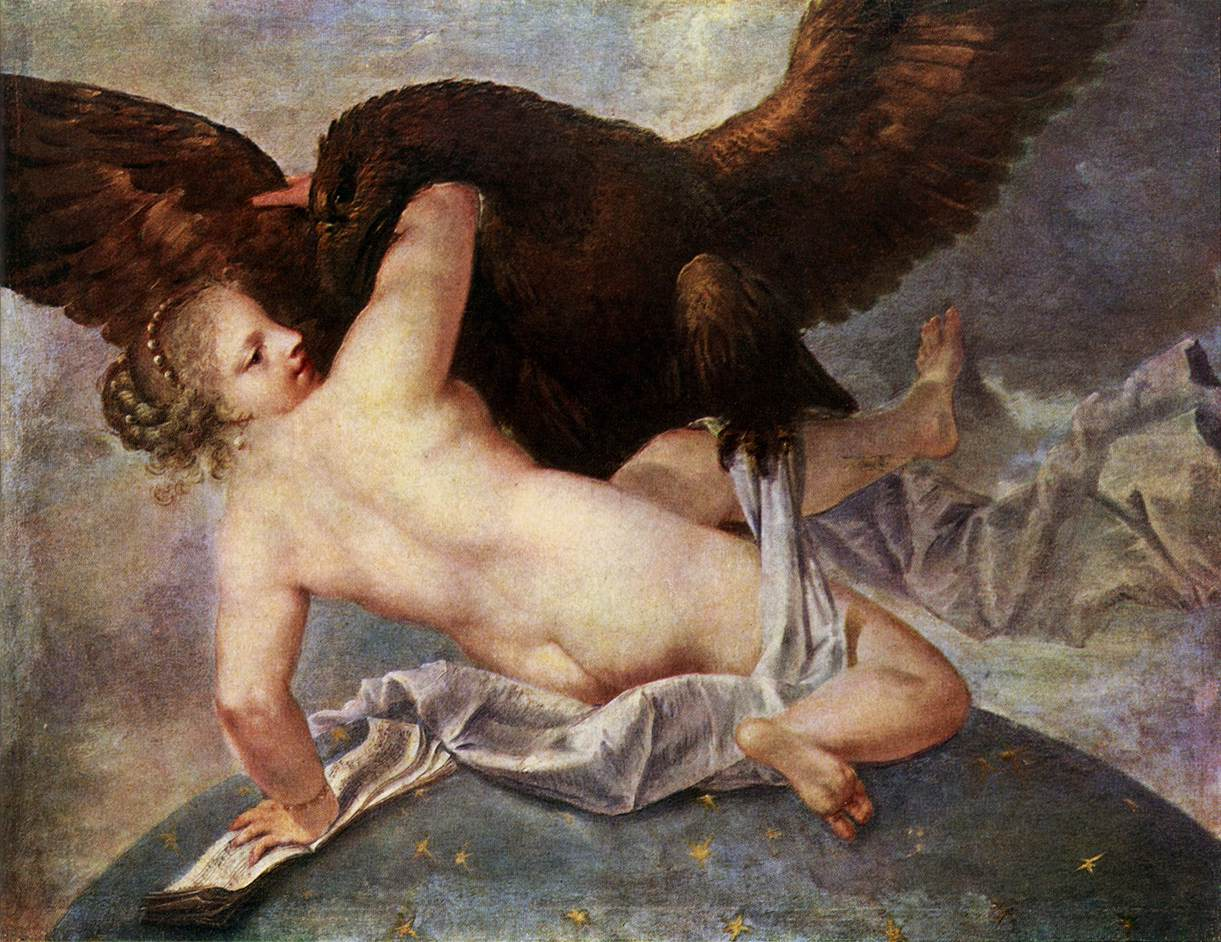
Asteria pursued by Zeus in the form of an eagle by Marco Liberi

Asteria was an inhabitant of Olympus following the Titanomachy in which the Olympians prevailed over the Titans, and like her sister Leto before her she was beloved by Zeus. After Zeus had impregnated Leto, his attention was next captured by her sister Asteria. Asteria rejected the enamoured Zeus, but he pursued her nonetheless. In order to escape the amorous advances of the god, who in the form of an eagle chased her down, she transformed herself into a quail (Ancient Greek: ὄρτυξ, órtux) and flung herself into the Aegean Sea. It was there that Asteria metamorphosed into the island Asteria (the island which had fallen from heaven like a star), or the "quail island" Ortygia. The island was described in ancient sources as both floating or hidden under the sea. It was small and barren.

This then became identified with the island of Delos, which was the only place on earth to give refuge to the fugitive Leto when, pregnant with Zeus's children, she was pursued by vengeful Hera, the wife of Zeus. Hera had forbidden all places on earth to allow Leto to give birth on them, and sent Ares and Iris to enforce her command, but Delos defied Hera and invited Leto in. According to Hyginus, Leto was borne by the north wind Boreas at the command of Zeus to the floating island, at the time when Python was pursuing her, and there clinging to an olive, she gave birth to Apollo and Artemis. Delos was named so because after the birth of Apollo it became visible and apparent to the world, as before it was hidden beneath the waves, and fixed to the sea bed, so it was no longer floating. Cynthius and Cynthia, two common epithets for the twin gods in antiquity, were derived from Mt Cynthus, a mountain on the island.

Hera, despite being enraged that Asteria had defied her and allowed Leto to give birth to the products of Zeus' liaison, did no harm to Asteria, out of respect for her for not sleeping with Zeus when he chased her, and instead preferring the sea over him, thus not further defiling Hera's marriage. Asteria's power to withstand Hera's threats seems to stem from her parentage as the daughter of two Titans.

=== Other myths ===
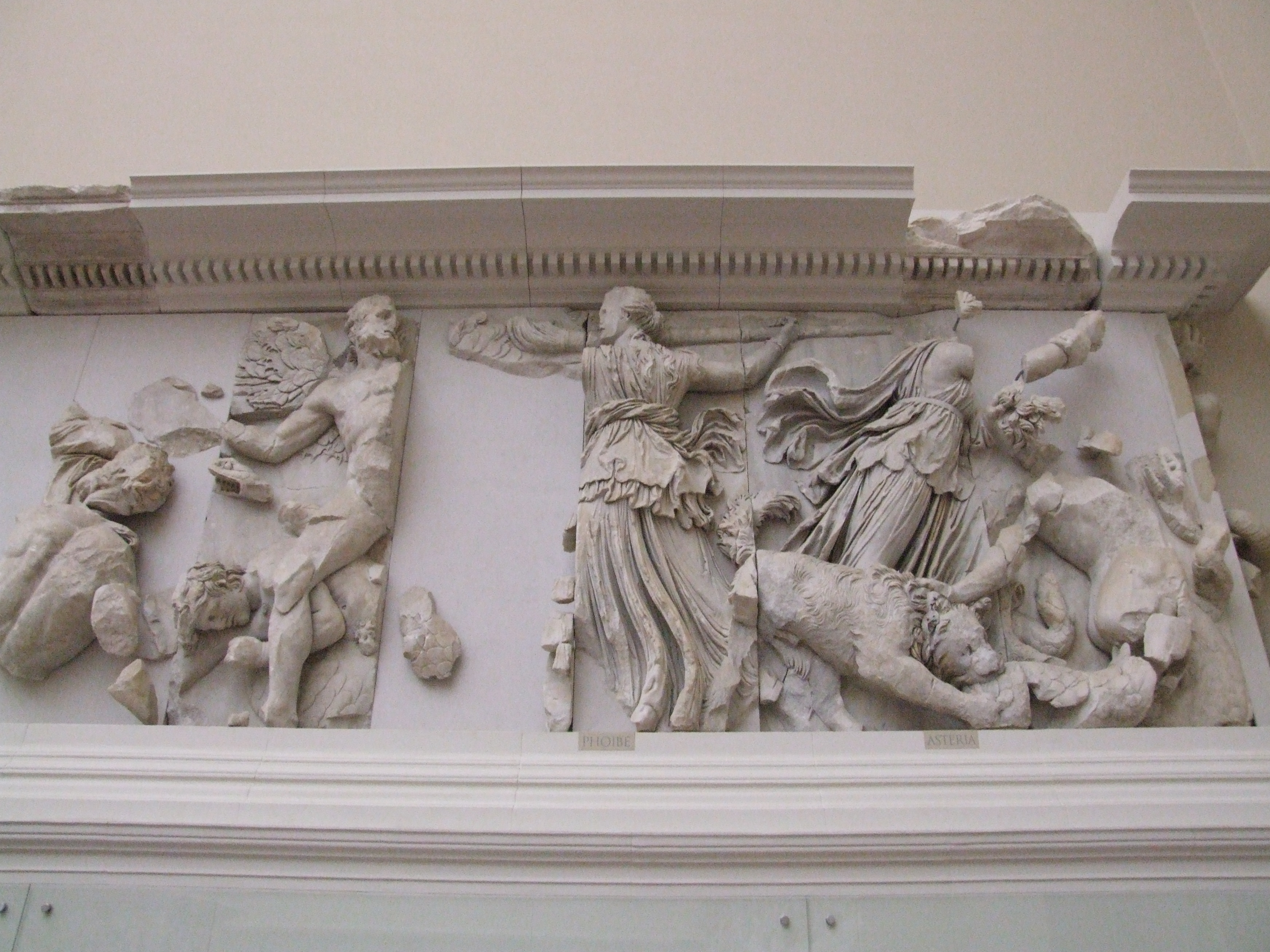
Asteria and Phoebe on the Pergamon Altar, Berlin.

A different version was added by the fifth-century poet Nonnus who recounted that, after Asteria was pursued by Zeus but turned herself into a quail and leapt into the sea, Poseidon instead took up the chase. In the madness of his passion, he hunted the chaste goddess to and fro in the sea, riding restless before the changing wind and thus she transformed herself into the desert island of Delos with the help of her nephew Apollo who rooted her in the waves immovable. The narrative with Poseidon only appears in Nonnus's work, and was likely invented by him.

Asteria evidently joined the other gods during the Gigantomachy, as evidenced in the Gigantomachy frieze on the Pergamon Altar, where Asteria is seen fighting against the Giants next to her mother Phoebe.

In a rare and non-standard account recorded by Athenaeus, Asteria was made the mother of Heracles by Zeus. In this account, Heracles is slain by Typhon but then brought back to life with the help of a quail.

=== References and allusions ===
When Athena competed with the Lydian maiden Arachne over who was the most talented seamstress, the girl wove a fine but contemptuous tapestry depicting the male gods tricking the mortal women they were interested in by changing their forms, including Asteria struggling to escape Zeus in the form of an eagle.

The story of wandering Delos being fixed to the ocean floor is humorously parodied by Lucian in his satiric dialogues, in which Poseidon undertakes the task to fix Delos by telling it to stop at the request of Zeus (via his messenger Iris) so Leto can give birth.

== Origins ==
=== Family and connections ===
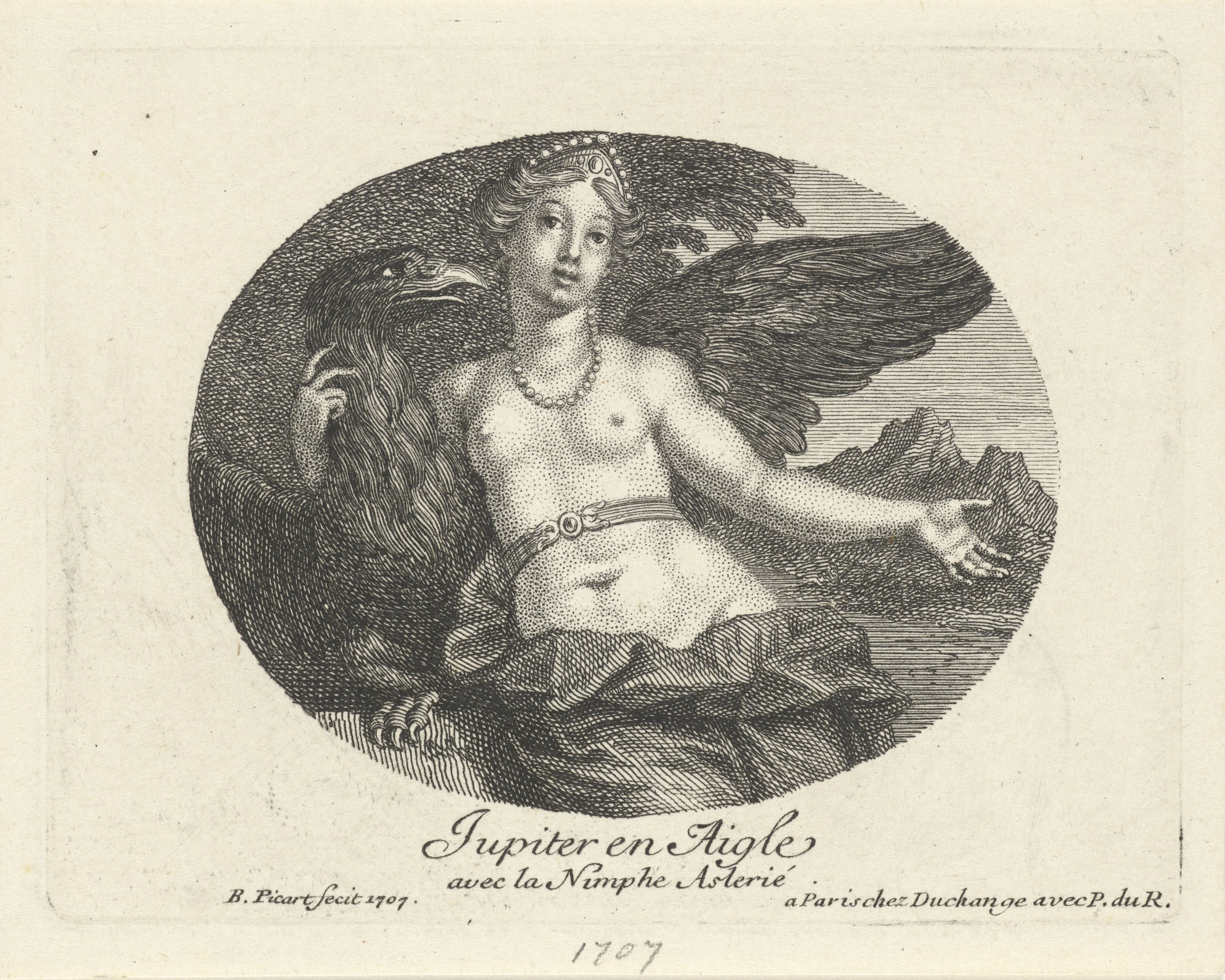
Zeus and Asteria in an 1707 engraving by Bernard Picart, Rijksmuseum Amsterdam.

The goddess Asteria is attested as early as the eighth century BC, appearing in Hesiod's Theogony, a work documenting the genealogical lines of the gods, where she is listed in relation to her parents, sister and daughter. However Hesiod makes no mention of Asteria becoming Delos; in fact Hesiod does not seem to have known about the tale of Hera pursuing Leto at all, as he lists Leto's liaison with Zeus before his marriage to Hera. The earliest work to relate the story of Leto's troubled travels and Apollo's birth is the sixth-century BC Homeric Hymn to Apollo, but nothing in the conversation between Leto and Delos in it indicates such a past for the island, let alone that the two are sisters. Additionally, the Hymn does not explicitly make Hera the reason why Leto is having so much trouble finding a suitable place to give birth, an element which is more pronounced in later versions.

Asteria as the origin of Delos seems to have been introduced by Pindar in the fifth century BC, who in one of his fragmentary paeans writes that Zeus pursued Asteria, presumably for amorous purposes (although this is unverifiable due to the missing text), and she was flung into the sea, becoming the floating island Ortygia which Pindar in other hymns identifies as Delos. Confusingly, elsewhere he calls Ortygia the sister of Delos, and in that case he might have meant a nearby islet called Rhenia to be Ortygia.

Later the Hellenistic poet Callimachus used Pindar as his source for the more coherent Hymn to Delos, in which focus is shifted from Apollo to the island itself and the story of how Asteria threw herself into the sea in order to avoid mating with Zeus. A major difference is the level of agency the two poets give Asteria; in Pindar she is passively flung, perhaps even as a punishment, while Callimachus has her actively choose the sea over Zeus, and then later to ignore Hera's orders; on the other hand, neither Pindar nor Callimachus mention the quail metamorphosis, which is first alluded to later still. Like the Homeric hymn however, Callimachus also does not allude to the kinship between Leto and Asteria either, in contrast to Hesiod, who recorded that they are sisters but did not make Asteria the origin of Delos. A papyrus fragment from Oxyrhynchus attributed to a lost 50 BC work by Parthenius of Nicaea mentions her parentage, Zeus' pursue of her and Asteria's double transformation first into a bird and then a floating island.

In Greek mythology, while transformation into a rock is usually a barren fate, a pattern emerges in which the heroines who were transformed into islands are lovers of the gods; similarly, islands were usually personified as minor goddesses or heroes, like cities were.

=== Delos and Ortygia ===
Although the island in which the twins were born after Asteria was transformed into it is mostly treated as a single place, variously referred to as Delos or Ortygia, several traditions make a distinction between the two islands, having Delos as the birthplace of Apollo and Ortygia of Artemis. Ortygia was a title of Artemis, signifying her connection to quails. Traditionally, it was said that Ortygia eventually was renamed to Delos after Apollo was born on it in order to connect two names to the same place. When not conflated with Delos as it was most common in later times, Ortygia could be variably identified with the small island off Sicily, or the one next to Asia Minor, or Rhenia next to Delos.

== Genealogy ==
Asteria's family tree.

Uranus	Gaia	Pontus
Oceanus	Tethys	Hyperion	Theia	Crius	Eurybia
The Rivers	The Oceanids	Helios	Selene	Eos	Astraeus	Pallas	Perses
Cronus	Rhea	Coeus	Phoebe
Hestia	Hera	Poseidon	Zeus	Leto	ASTERIA
Demeter	Hades	Apollo	Artemis	Hecate
Iapetus	Clymene (or Asia)	Themis	(Zeus)	Mnemosyne
Atlas	Menoetius	Prometheus	Epimetheus	The Horae	The Muses

== See also ==
- Nemesis
- Astraeus
- Calliste
- Aea
- Pitys
- Daphne
