= Arges (Cyclops) =

Greek mythological figure

Arges (Greek: Ἄργης) was one of the three Hesiodic Cyclopes in Greek mythology. He was elsewhere called Acmonides or Pyracmon. His name means "bright" and represents the brightness from lightning.

== Birth and forging of the lightning bolt ==
Arges is a child of Gaia and Uranus, and his siblings include his fellow cyclopes, Brontes and Steropes, along with the Titans and the Hecatoncheires. After his birth, Uranus is said to have locked Arges and his cyclopes brothers in Tartarus out of fear, along with the Hundred Handed Ones. During the war between the Titans and the Gods, Arges, Brontes, and Steropes were freed to fashion lightning bolts for Zeus during his attempt to overthrow the gods. According to Apollodorus, Arges and his fellow cyclopes also fashioned the Helmet of Invisibility for Hades, and the trident for Poseidon. These weapons played a key role in the downfall of the Titans.

== Possible death ==
In Hesiod's Catalogue of Women, the three Cyclopes, including Arges, are said to have been killed by Apollo in retaliation for his son Asclepius being killed by a lightning bolt. However, this contradicts Hesiod's Theogony, which implies the cyclopes are immortal. The mythographer Pherecydes of Athens fixes this discrepancy by stating that the cyclopes' sons were killed by Apollo, rather than the cyclopes themselves. Another source suggests that Zeus killed the cyclopes to prevent them from making lightning bolts for anyone other than himself.
