= Crius =

Titan in Greek mythology

- Member of the Titans
- Ancient Greek: Κρεῖος
- Abode: Tartarus
- Battles: Titanomachy

Genealogy
- Parents: Uranus and Gaia
- Siblings: Titans: Cronus; Coeus; Hyperion; Iapetus; Oceanus; Mnemosyne; Phoebe; Rhea; Tethys; Theia; Themis; Hecatoncheires: Briareos; Cottus; Gyges; Cyclopes: Arges; Brontes; Steropes; Other siblings: Gigantes; Erinyes (the Furies); Meliae
- Consort: Eurybia
- Offspring: Astraeus, Pallas, Perses

In Greek mythology, Crius, Krios or Kreios (/ˈkraɪəs/; Ancient Greek: Κρεῖος or Κριός) was one of the Titans, the children of Uranus (Sky) and Gaia (Earth).

== Etymology ==
Although "krios" was also the ancient Greek word for "ram", the Titan's chthonic position in the underworld means no classical association with Aries, the ram of the zodiac, is ordinarily made. At the time of Ancient Greece, Aries was the first visible constellation in the sky at the spring season, marking the start of the new year in the ancient Greek calendar.

== Family ==
According to Hesiod, with Eurybia, daughter of Gaia ("Earth") and Pontus ("Sea"), he fathered Astraios, Pallas, and Perses. The joining of Astraios with Eos, the Dawn, brought forth Eosphoros, Hesperus, Astraea, the other stars, and the winds.

== Mythology ==
Joined to fill out lists of Titans to form a total matching the Twelve Olympians, Crius was inexorably involved in the ten-year-long war between the Olympian gods and Titans, the Titanomachy, though without any specific part to play. When the war was lost, Crius was banished along with the others to the lower level of Hades called Tartarus.

As the least individualized among the Titans, he was overthrown in the Titanomachy. M. L. West has suggested how Hesiod filled out the complement of Titans from the core group—adding three figures from the archaic tradition of Delphi, Coeus, Phoebe—whose name Apollo assumed with the oracle—and Themis. Among possible further interpolations among the Titans was Crius, whose interest for Hesiod was as the father of Perses and grandfather of Hecate, for whom Hesiod was, according to West, an "enthusiastic evangelist".

== Genealogical tree ==
Family of Eurybia and Crius

Pontus	Gaia	Uranus
Eurybia	Crius
Astraeus	Eos	Perses	Asteria	Pallas	Styx
Boreas	Astraea	Hecate	Zelus	Kratos
Notus	Eosphorus	Nike	Bia
Zephyrus	Stars

== See also ==
- Greek mythology in popular culture
- Greek primordial deities
