= Perses (son of Crius) =

Ancient Greek mythological Titan

Genealogy
- Parents: Crius and Eurybia
- Siblings: Pallas and Astraeus
- Consort: Asteria
- Children: Hecate

In Greek mythology, Perses (/ˈpɜːrsiz/ PUR-seez; Ancient Greek: Πέρσης, romanized: Pérsēs, lit. 'destroyer') is the son of the Titan Crius and Eurybia, and thus brother to Astraeus and Pallas. Ancient tradition records very little of Perses other than his marriage and offspring, his role largely being genealogical, existing merely to provide a parentage for other, more important figures.

== Etymology ==
His name is derived from the Ancient Greek word perthō (πέρθω – "to sack", "to ravage", "to destroy").

== Family ==
According to the Theogony, Perses was born to Crius, one of the original twelve Titans, and Eurybia. He had two brothers, Astraeus and Pallas.

== Mythology ==
According to Timothy Gantz, Hesiod "oddly" describes Perses as "eminent among all men in wisdom." He was wed to his cousin Asteria, the daughter of Phoebe and Coeus, with whom he had one child, Hecate, honoured by the king of the gods Zeus above all others as the goddess of magic, crossroads, and witchcraft. In a lesser-known tradition mentioned by Musaeus, the father of Hecate was Zeus himself; Zeus kept Asteria as his mistress for some time before giving her to Perses.

He was sometimes confused with another Perses (the son of the sun-god Helios and the nymph Perse), who was made the father of Hecate in some versions. He might also be the same Perses who is the father of Chariclo, the wife of Chiron, in some versions.

== Family tree ==
Family of Eurybia and Crius

Pontus	Gaia	Uranus
Eurybia	Crius
Astraeus	Eos	Perses	Asteria	Pallas	Styx
Boreas	Astraea	Hecate	Zelus	Kratos
Notus	Eosphorus	Nike	Bia
Zephyrus	Stars

== See also ==
- Athena
- Perses of Colchis
- Ares
