= Astraeus =

Son of Crius and Eurybia in Greek mythology

Genealogy
- Parents: Crius and Eurybia
- Siblings: Perses, Pallas
- Consort: Eos
- Offspring: Boreas, Notus, Zephyrus, Eurus, Eosphorus, Astraea

In Greek mythology, Astraeus (/əˈstriːəs/) or Astraios (Ancient Greek: Ἀστραῖος, romanized: Astraîos, lit. 'starry') is the son of Crius and Eurybia and the consort of Eos (goddess of the dawn). He is said to be the father of the winds. Astraeus does not have a big role in mythology, mostly existing to provide genealogy for other figures.

== Etymology ==
His name "Astraeus" (Ancient Greek Ἀστραῖος, translit. Astraîos) is derived from the Greek word ἀστήρ (astḗr) "star". Ἀστήρ itself is inherited from the Proto-Indo-European root *h₂ster- "star", from *h₂eh₁s- "to burn".

== Family ==
According to Hesiod's Theogony and the Bibliotheca, Astraeus is one of the three sons of Crius and Eurybia. However, Hyginus wrote that he was descended directly from Tartarus and Gaia and referred to him as one of the Gigantes.

Astraeus married Eos, the goddess of the dawn. Together as nightfall and daybreak, they produced many children associated with what occurs in the sky during twilight. In Hesiod's Theogony, Astraeus and Eos produce the winds—namely Zephyrus, Boreas, and Notus, with the fourth one, Eurus, being included as his son in later sources—as well as Eosphorus and the stars. A few sources mention another daughter, Astraea, the goddess of innocence and, occasionally, justice.

== Mythology ==
Nonnus's epic poem Dionysiaca, written in the fifth century, is the only work in which Astraeus has a significant appearance not related to the genealogy of the gods. In it Astraeus is presented as an oracular god whom the goddess Demeter visited once, concerned about her daughter Persephone's future as she had started to attract a significant number of admirers on Olympus, worrying Demeter that she might end up marrying Hephaestus. Astraeus then warned her that soon enough, Persephone would be ravished by a serpent and bear fruit from that union, a revelation which greatly upset Demeter.

Servius, perhaps conflating him with the Giant like Hyginus did, wrote that he took arms and fought against the gods.

== Family tree ==
Family of Eurybia and Crius

Pontus	Gaia	Uranus
Eurybia	Crius
Astraeus	Eos	Perses	Asteria	Pallas	Styx
Boreas	Astraea	Hecate	Zelus	Kratos
Notus	Eosphorus	Nike	Bia
Zephyrus	Stars
