= Eurybia (mythology) =

Greek sea goddess

In Greek mythology, Eurybia (/jʊəˈrɪbiə/; Ancient Greek: Εὐρυβία or Εὐρυβίη, lit. 'wide-force'), described as "[having] a heart of flint within her", was the daughter of Pontus and Gaia, consort to the Titan Crius, and mother of Astraeus, Perses and Pallas. An older, relatively minor deity, her role in most mythology is as the ancestor of other gods, and she often plays no role in the mythology.

== Family tree ==
Family of Eurybia and Crius

Pontus	Gaia	Uranus
Eurybia	Crius
Astraeus	Eos	Perses	Asteria	Pallas	Styx
Boreas	Astraea	Hecate	Zelus	Kratos
Notus	Eosphorus	Nike	Bia
Zephyrus	Stars
