= Koenigs (surname) =

Surname

Koenigs is a surname.

Notable people with the surname include:

- Deo A. Koenigs (born 1935), American politician
- Felix Koenigs (1846 – 1900), German banker and art collector
- Franz Koenigs (3 September 1881 – 6 May 1941), German banker and art collector
- Gabriel Xavier Paul Koenigs (1858 1931), French mathematician
- Gustav Koenigs (1882 – 1945), German lawyer and State Secretary of Transport during the Weimar period and the Third Reich.
- Lothar Koenigs (born 1965), German conductor
- Tom Koenigs (Thomas Carl Joerge Koenigs) (born January 25, 1944), German politician and a member of the Bundestag
