= Gerettet =

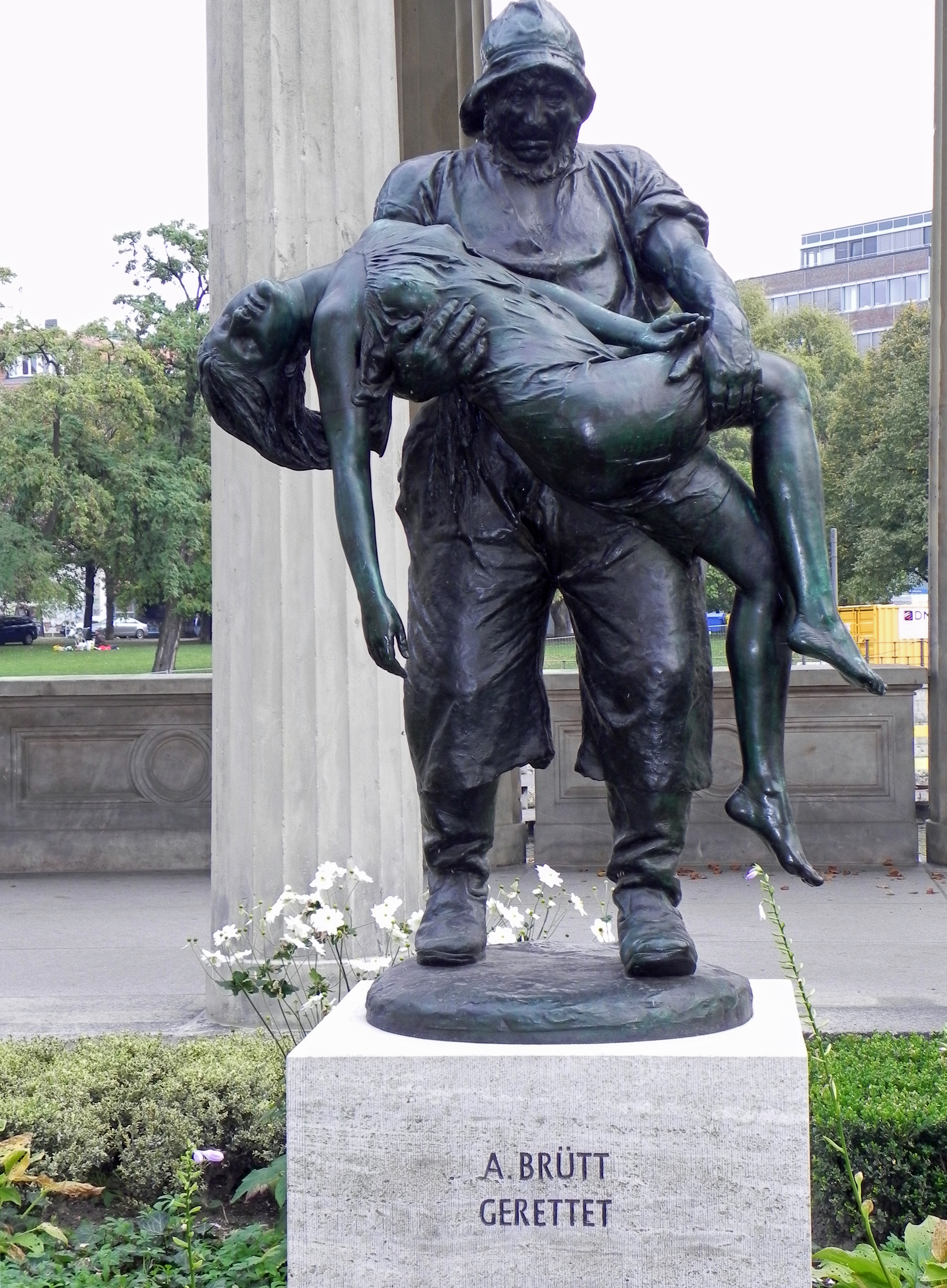
- The sculpture in 2011
- Artist: Adolf Brütt
- Location: Berlin, Germany
- 52°31′14″N 13°23′58″E

Gerettet is a sculpture by Adolf Brütt, installed in the Kolonnadenhof outside the Alte Nationalgalerie in Berlin, Germany.
