= Pergamon Altar =

Ancient Greek building from Pergamon, now in Berlin

Coordinates: 39°07′52″N 27°11′02″E

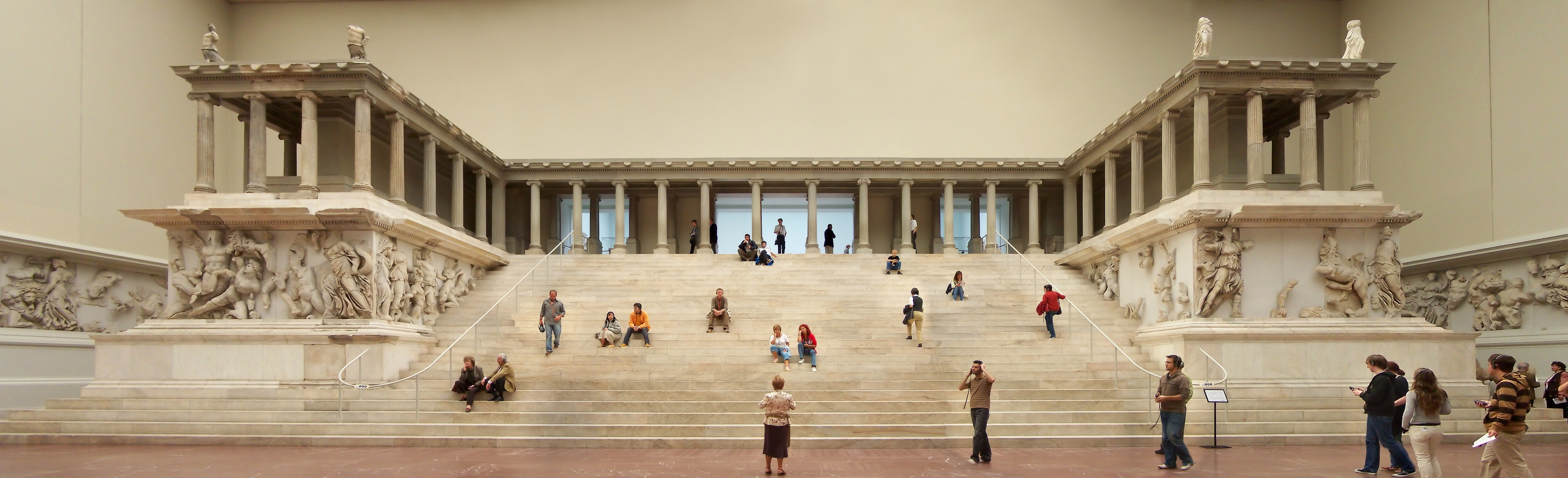
The reconstructed Pergamon Altar in the Pergamon Museum in Berlin

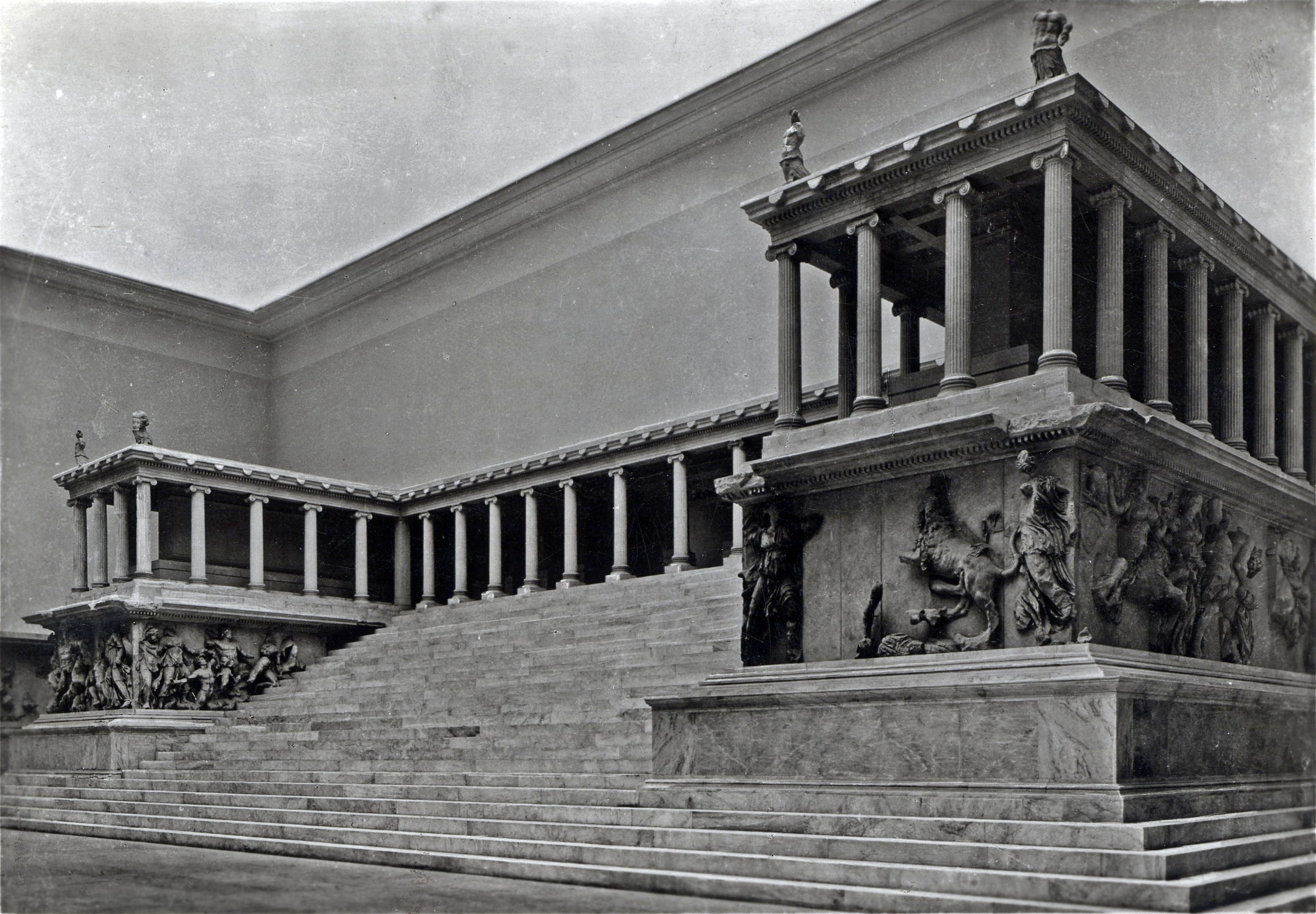
Side view

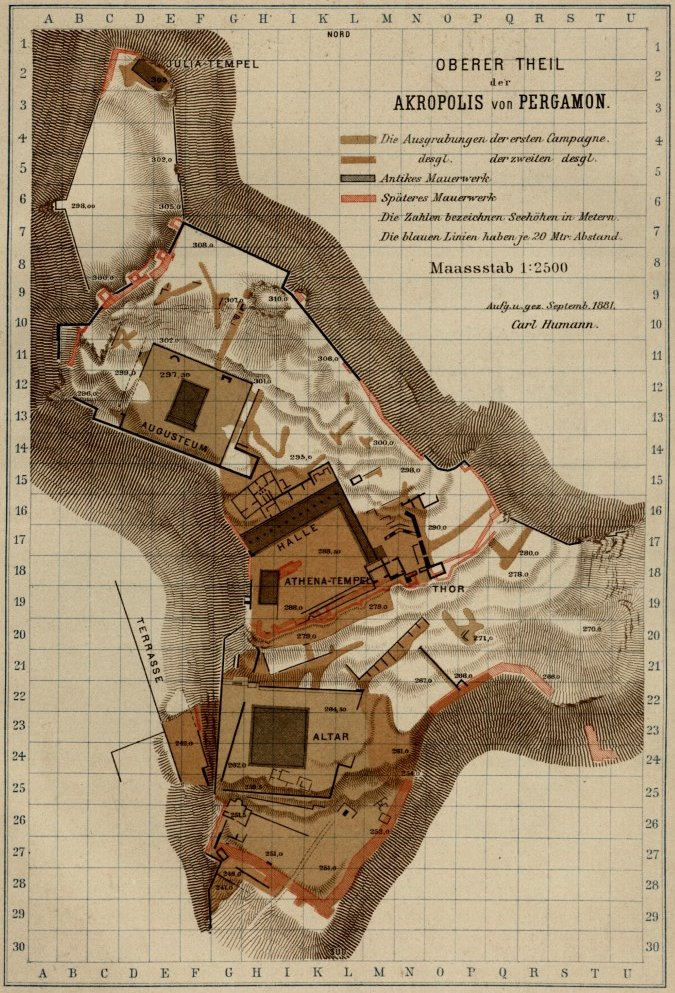
Carl Humann's 1881 plan of the Pergamon acropolis

The Pergamon Altar (Ancient Greek: Βωμός τῆς Περγάμου) was a monumental construction built during the reign of the Ancient Greek King Eumenes II of the Pergamon Empire in the first half of the 2nd century BC on one of the terraces of the acropolis of Pergamon in Asia Minor (modern-day Turkey). It was described as one of the Seven Wonders of the Ancient World by three known classical lists.

The structure was 35.74 metres (117 ft 3 in) wide and 33.4 metres (109 ft 7 in) deep; the front stairway alone was almost 20 metres (66 ft) wide. The base was decorated with a frieze in high relief showing the battle between the Giants and the Olympian gods known as the Gigantomachy. There was a second, smaller and less well-preserved high relief frieze on the inner court walls which surrounded the actual fire altar on the upper level of the structure at the top of the stairs. In a set of consecutive scenes, it depicts events from the life of Telephus, legendary founder of the city of Pergamon and son of the hero Heracles and Auge, one of Tegean king Aleus's daughters.

In 1878, the German engineer Carl Humann started official excavations on the acropolis of Pergamon, an effort that lasted until 1886. The relief panels from the Pergamon Altar were subsequently transferred to Berlin, where they were placed on display in the Pergamon Museum.

== In antiquity ==
=== Historical background ===
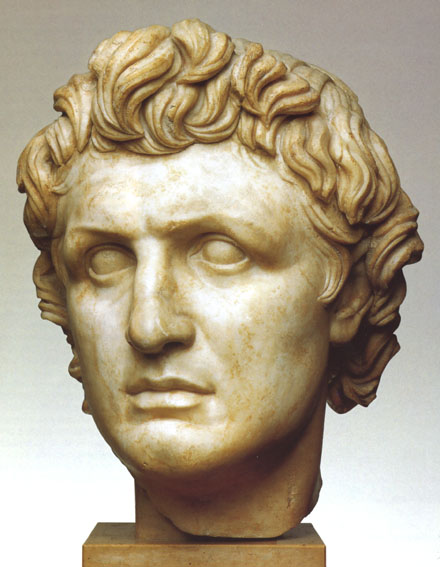
Larger-than-life sculptured head presumably of Attalus I, from early in the reign of Eumenes II.

The Pergamene kingdom founded by Philetaerus at the beginning of the 3rd century BC was initially part of the Hellenistic Seleucid Empire. Attalus I, successor and nephew of Eumenes I, was the first to achieve full independence for the territory and proclaimed himself king after his victory over the Celtic Galatians in 228 BC. This victory over the Galatians, a threat to the Pergamene kingdom, secured his power, which he then attempted to consolidate. With conquests in Asia Minor at the expense of the weakened Seleucids he could briefly increase the size of his kingdom. A Seleucid counteroffensive under Antiochos III reached the gates of Pergamon but could not put an end to Pergamene independence. Since the Seleucids were becoming stronger in the east, Attalus turned his attention westward to Greece and was able to occupy almost all of Euboea. His son, Eumenes II, further limited the influence of the Galatians and ruled alongside his brother Attalus II, who succeeded him. In 188 BC, Eumenes II was able to create the Treaty of Apamea as an ally of Rome, thus reducing the influence of the Seleucids in Asia Minor. The Attalids were thus an emerging power with the desire to demonstrate their importance to the outside world through the construction of imposing buildings.

Citing the Book of Revelation 2:12-13 in the Christian Bible, many scholars have argued that the Pergamon Altar is the "Seat of Satan" mentioned by John the Apostle in his letter to the church at Pergamon.

=== Endowment and dating ===
Until the second half of the 20th century it had been assumed by some scholars that the altar was endowed in 184 BC by Eumenes II after a victory over the Celtic Tolistoagian tribe and their leader Ortiagon. Investigation of the altar's construction and friezes has led to the conclusion that it was not conceived as a monument to a particular victory. The design of Pergamene victory monuments is known from the literature and monument relics and is unlike that of the Pergamon Altar.

The Gigantomachy frieze on the outside walls of the Pergamon altar avoids to a great extent any direct references to contemporary military campaigns — except for the "Star of Macedonia" on the round shield of one of the Giants on the eastern frieze, and a Celtic oblong shield in the hand of a god on the northern frieze. The struggle of the Olympian gods appears much rather to be a cosmological event of general ethical relevance. The scanty remnants of the dedicatory inscription also seem to indicate that the altar was consecrated to the gods because of "favors" they had bestowed. The divine addressees could be especially Zeus, father of the gods, and his daughter Athena, since they appear in prominent locations of the Gigantomachy frieze. An important dating criterion is also the incorporation of the altar from the perspective of city planning. As the most important marble edifice of the Hellenistic residence and indeed erected in a prominent position, it was assuredly not begun only at the conclusion of numerous initiatives to upgrade the acropolis of Pergamon under Eumenes II.

That events from the last years of Eumenes II's reign, the increasing uncoupling from the Romans, and the victory over the Celts in 166 BC at Sardis are reflected in the two friezes of the Pergamon Altar is merely speculation that does not provide a sufficient foundation for a late dating of the altar. The inner Telephus frieze relates the legendary life of Heracles' son Telephus and is meant to convey the superiority of Pergamon compared with the Romans. Thus the founder of Rome, Romulus, was traditionally nursed only by a she-wolf, whereas Telephus, to whom the Attalids trace their ancestry, is shown in the frieze being suckled by a she-lion. It is estimated that the frieze was constructed between 170 BC and at least the death of Eumenes II (159 BC).

One of the latest suggestions for dating the construction of the altar comes from Bernard Andrea's 2001 work. According to his findings, the altar was erected between 166 and 156 BC as a general victory monument commemorating the triumphs of the Pergamenes, and especially of Eumenes II, over the Macedonians, the Galatians and the Seleucids, and was designed by Phyromachos, the seventh and last of the greatest Greek sculptors, who included Myron, Phidias, Polykleitos, Scopas, Praxiteles and Lysippos. In the foundation of the altar a pottery shard was found which could be dated to 172/171 BC; the building must accordingly have been erected later. Since large amounts of money had to be spent on warfare until 166 BC, it is likely that construction of the altar could only start from this date.

=== Function ===
Contrary to popular belief, the Pergamon Altar is not a temple, but probably the altar of a temple, although altars were generally located outdoors in front of their temples. It is supposed that the Athena temple located on the acropolis terrace above it may have been its cultic point of reference, and the altar possibly served solely as a place of sacrifice. This theory is supported by several statue bases and consecrating inscriptions found in the vicinity of the altar and whose donors named Athena. Another possibility is that both Zeus and Athena were jointly honored. It could also be that the altar had an independent function. In contrast to a temple, which always had an altar, an altar did not necessarily have to have a temple. Altars could, for example, be quite small and placed in houses or, less commonly, have gigantic dimensions as in the case of the Pergamon Altar. The few remnants of inscriptions do not supply enough information to determine to which god the altar was dedicated.

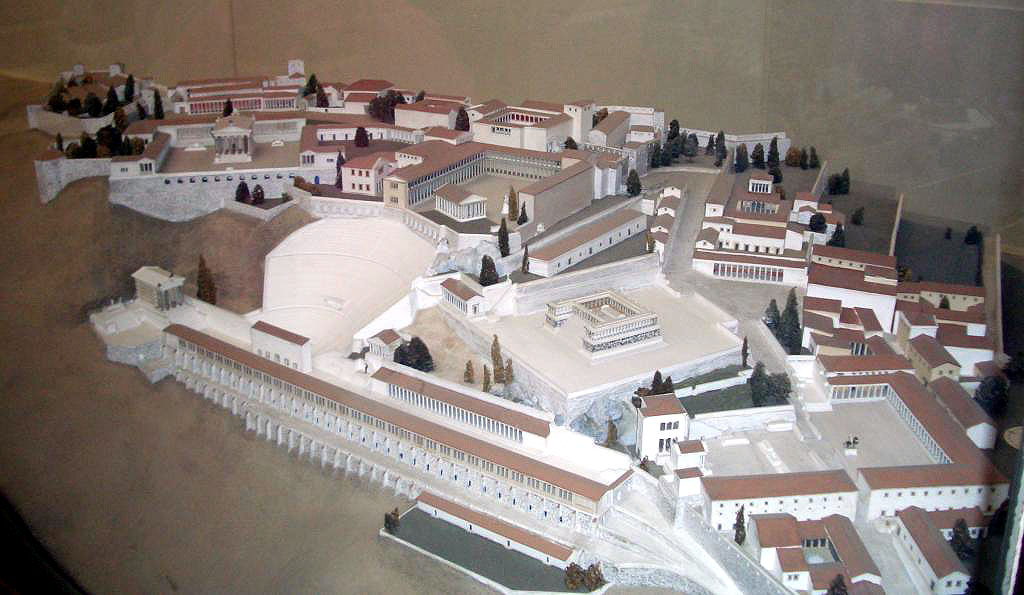
Model of the 2nd century BC Pergamon acropolis in the Pergamon Museum in Berlin, which includes the Roman additions. The altar is on a terrace near the center with its stairway facing left (west)

So far, none of these theories is generally accepted. This situation led a long-time director of excavations in Pergamon, Wolfgang Radt, to conclude that:

No research is undisputed concerning this most famous artistic masterpiece of Pergamon, neither the builder nor the date nor the occasion nor the purpose of the construction.

Just as uncertain is the nature of the sacrifices made there. Judging from the remains of the actual, relatively small fire altar inside the huge altar edifice, it can at least be concluded that its shape resembled a horseshoe. It was apparently an altar with two projecting side wings and one or several steps in front. Possibly the thighs of sacrificial animals were burned here. But it is just as possible that the altar served only for libations — the offering of sacrifices in the form of incense, wine and fruits. It is likely that only priests, members of the royal household and illustrious foreign guests were allowed access to the fire altar.

H. A. Groenewegen-Frankfort and Bernard Ashmole wrote that they were certain that the Greeks who used the altar did not believe in the reality of the events depicted on it, and that the art on the altar was based on previously told myths popular in Pergamon.

=== Until the close of antiquity ===
Probably in the 2nd century, the Roman Lucius Ampelius recorded in his liber memorialis ("Notebook"), in Chapter VIII (Miracula Mundi): "At Pergamum there is a great marble altar, 40 feet (12 m) high, with colossal sculptures. It also shows a Gigantomachy."

Besides a comment by Pausanias, who compares sacrificial practice in Olympia with that in Pergamon, this is the only written reference to the altar in all of antiquity. This is all the more surprising because the writers of antiquity otherwise wrote a great deal about such works of art, and Ampelius considered the altar to be one of the wonders of the world. The absence of written sources from antiquity about the altar has given rise to a number of interpretations. One possibility is that the Romans did not regard this Hellenistic altar as important since it did not date from the classic epoch of Greek, especially Attic, art. Only this art and later evocation of the associated values were considered significant and worth mentioning. This view was held particularly by German researchers starting in the 18th century, especially after the work of Johann Joachim Winckelmann became known. The only graphic representations of the altar are on coins of the Roman Empire, which show the altar in a stylized form.

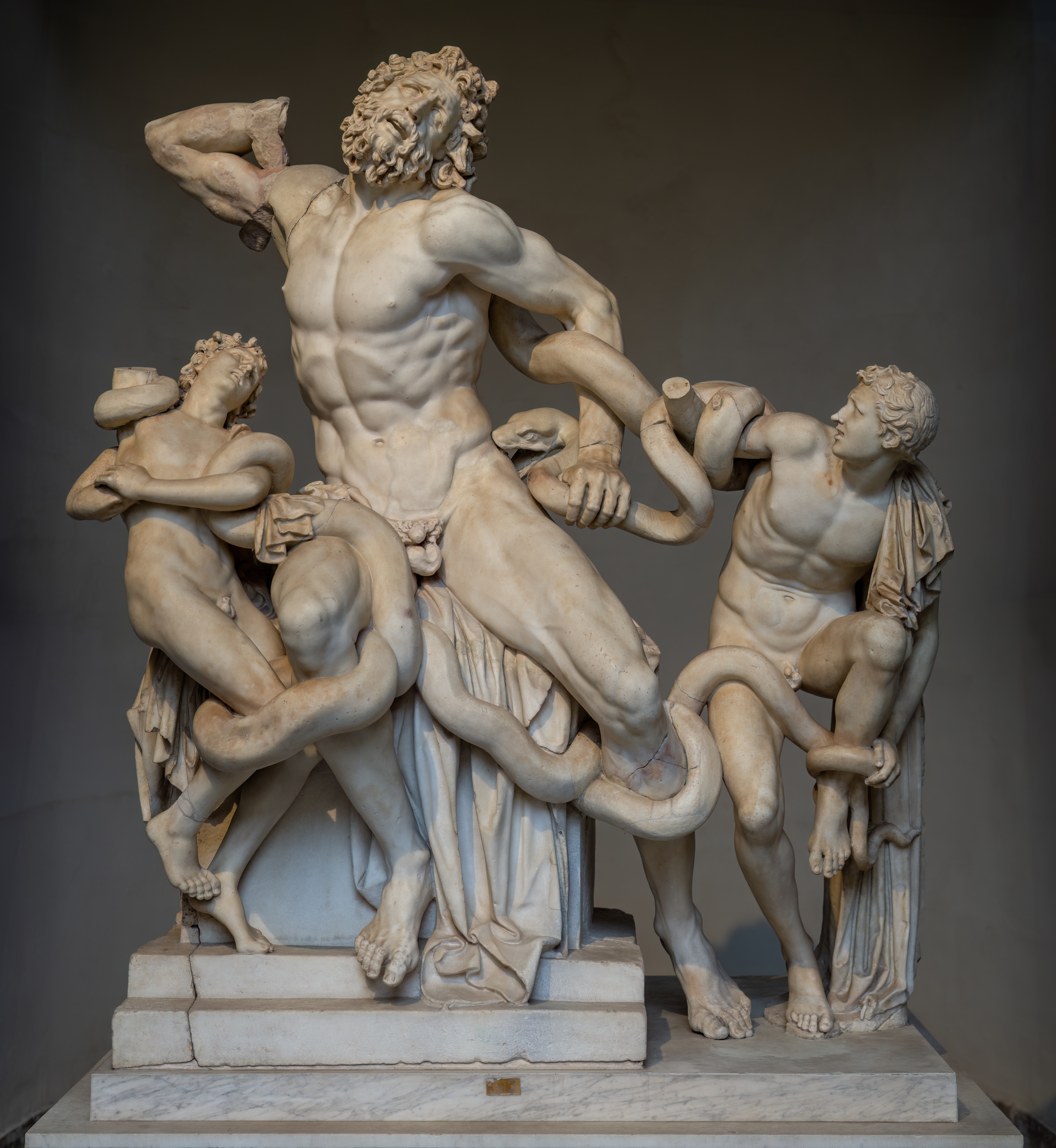
Laocoön and His Sons in the Vatican Museums

Since a reassessment of the perception and interpretation of antiquities dating from other than "classical" periods took place in the course of the 20th century, it is undisputed that the great altar of Pergamon is one of the most significant works, if not the apex, of Hellenistic art. The Laocoön and His Sons in the Vatican Museums, one of only a very few sculptures which are today regarded as especially fine examples of the art of antiquity, and which was already in antiquity declared to be a "masterpiece surpassing all other works of painting and sculpture", may be based on an original that also came from a Pergamene workshop and was created at about the same time as the altar. It is noteworthy that the opponent of the goddess Athena on the side of the Giants, Alcyoneus, strongly resembles Laokoon in posture and portrayal. When the frieze fragment was found, a cry was to be heard, "Now we have a Laokoon too!"

== From discovery to presentation in Berlin ==
=== From antiquity to 19th century excavations ===
With the rise of Christianity, the altar lost its function at the latest in Late Antiquity. In the 7th century the acropolis of Pergamon was strongly fortified as a defense against the Arabs. In the process the Pergamon Altar, among other structures, was partially destroyed in order to reuse the building material. The city was nevertheless defeated in 716 by the Arabs, who temporarily occupied it before abandoning it as unimportant. It was only resettled in the 12th century. In the 13th century Pergamon fell to the Turks.

Between 1431 and 1444 the Italian humanist Cyriacus of Ancona visited Pergamon and described it in his commentarii (diary). In 1625 William Petty, chaplain to Thomas Howard, 21st Earl of Arundel, a collector and art patron, traveled through Turkey, visited Pergamon, and brought back to England two relief panels from the altar. These pieces were forgotten after the Earl's collection was dispersed and were only rediscovered in the 1960s. For this reason these two panels are lacking in the Berlin reconstruction. Other travelers known to have visited Pergamon during the late 18th and early 19th centuries were, for example, the French diplomat and classical scholar Comte de Choiseul-Gouffier, the English architect Charles Robert Cockerell and two Germans, the archaeologist Otto Magnus von Stackelberg and the classical scholar Otto Friedrich von Richter. Choiseul-Gouffier was the first to propose excavations in Pergamon; the other three travelers made drawings of the city's acropolis.

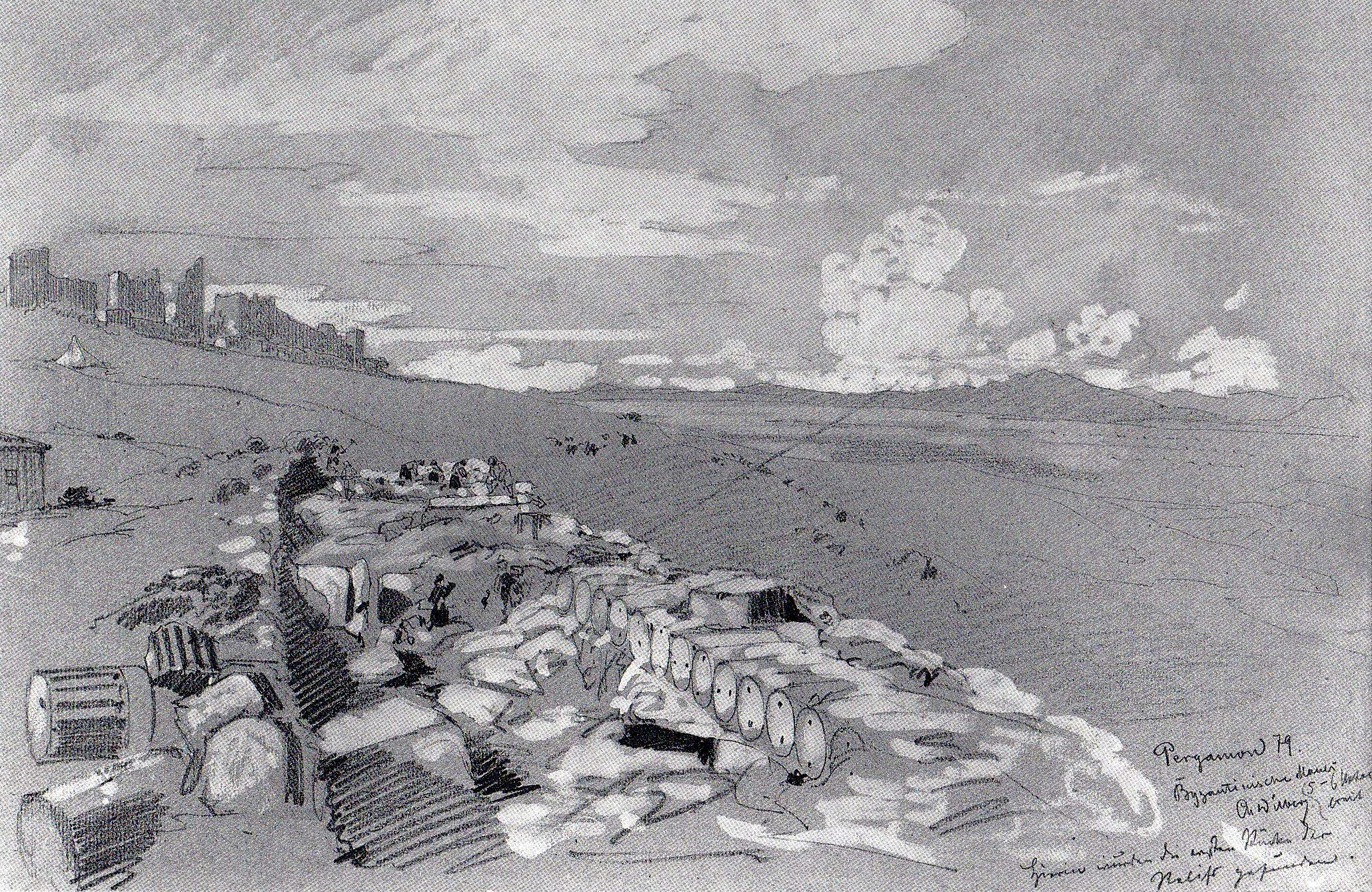
Christian Wilberg: Ausgrabungen an der byzantinischen Mauer; Pencil drawing with white highlighting; 29.8 x 46.7 cm, 1879; Caption (translated): "Byzantine Wall. 5-6 meters wide. Here is where the first fragments of the reliefs were found. Pergamon 79"

The German engineer Carl Humann came to Pergamon for the first time in 1864/65. He was charged with geographic investigations and repeatedly visited the city in the following years. He urged the preservation of the antiquities on the acropolis and attempted to find partners to assist in an excavation; as a private person he was not equal to such a major task, lacking the financial and logistic resources. It was important to begin excavation work as soon as possible because the local inhabitants of Bergama (the modern name of the ancient city of Pergamon) were using the altar and other above-ground ruins as a quarry, were looting the remnants of antique constructions in order to erect new buildings, and were burning some of the marble for lime. In 1871 the Berlin classicist Ernst Curtius and several other German scholars came to Pergamon at Humann's invitation. He arranged to ship some of the finds to Berlin, including two fragments of the altar frieze. He described the reliefs as (translated) "a battle with men, horses and wild animals". These pieces were put on display but were at first largely ignored.

Alexander Conze, who was appointed director of the sculpture collection of Berlin's royal museums in 1877, was the first person to connect the fragments with the Ampelius text and realize their significance. The timing was good, because the German government was anxious to match the other great powers also on a cultural level after the German Empire was established in 1871:

It is very important for the museums' collections, which are so far very deficient in Greek originals […] to now gain possession of a Greek work of art of a scope which, more or less, is of a rank close to or equal to the sculptures from Attica and Asia Minor in the British Museum.

Conze immediately contacted Humann, who at the time was in Turkey working for a road construction company. Things then moved quickly. The German government arranged for a license to dig in Turkey and in September 1878 excavations began, headed by Humann and Conze. By 1886, large parts of the acropolis had been investigated and in the following years also scientifically appraised and published. Based on an agreement between the Ottoman Empire and the German government, starting in 1879 the relief panels from the Pergamon Altar along with some other fragments came to Berlin and into the possession of the Collection of Antiquities. The German side was well aware that by doing this a work of art was being removed from its original location and was not completely happy about this situation:

We are not insensitive to what it means to remove the remnants of a great monument from their original location and bring them to a place where we can never again provide the lighting and environment in which they were created and in which they once conveyed their full effect. But we did rescue them from a destruction that was becoming ever more complete. There was not yet an Osman Hamdi Bey around, who soon became a close friend of Humann, and at the time we could not imagine what has become possible in the meantime with his help, that the ruins still at the site could be protected from the stone robbers of the modern city ...

=== In Berlin ===
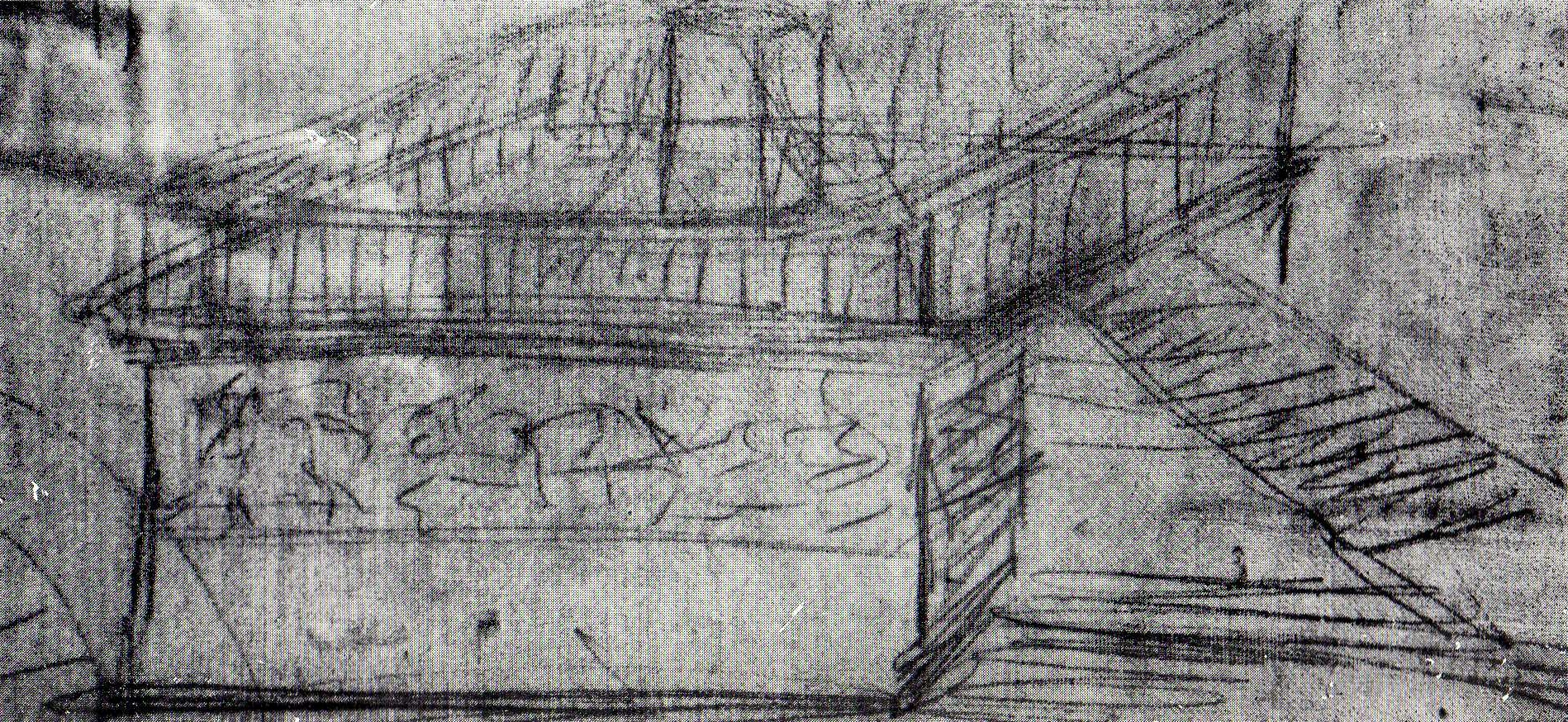
First rough sketch by Carl Humann relating to reconstruction of the Pergamon Altar, c. 1879

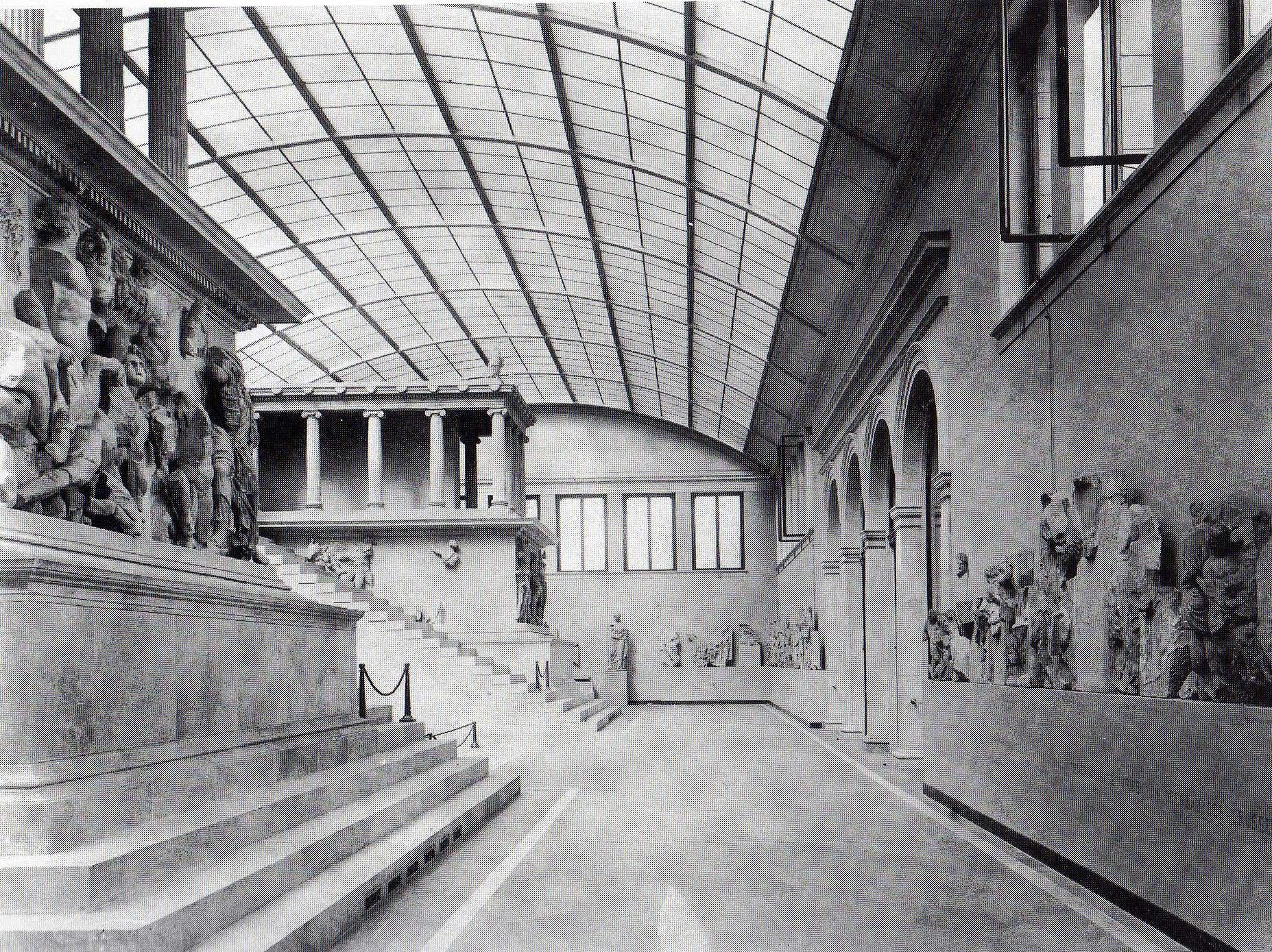
Reconstruction of the Pergamon Altar in a temporary building, western face, before 1908

The pieces could not initially be presented in an appropriate exhibition context and were placed in the overfilled Altes Museum, where especially the Telephus frieze could not be well displayed (the individual slabs were simply leant against the wall facing the altar). For this reason a new purpose-built museum was erected. The first "Pergamon Museum" was built between 1897 and 1899 by Fritz Wolff and opened in 1901 with the unveiling of a bust of Carl Humann by Adolf Brütt. This building was used until 1908 but was regarded as being only an interim solution and was accordingly called the "temporary building". Originally four archaeological museums were planned, one of them for the Pergamon Altar. But the first museum had to be demolished because of problems with the foundation. Also, it had originally been intended only for finds which could not be presented in the other three archaeological museums and thus from the beginning it was too small for the altar. After the museum was demolished, the Telephus frieze was set into the walls of the colonnade on the eastern side of the Neues Museum, but with windows allowing a view of the art objects.

The new building, designed by Alfred Messel, took until 1930 to construct, due to delays caused by World War I, the German Revolution of 1918–1919 and the hyperinflation of 1922/1923. This new Pergamon Museum presented the altar basically as it is seen today. There was a partial reconstruction in the central gallery of the museum with the frieze fragments installed on the surrounding walls. The Telephus frieze is, as in the original construction, reached via the flight of stairs, but only an abbreviated version is on display. It is not known why the complete altar was not reconstructed when the new museum was built and the frieze installed. When conceiving the exhibit, Theodor Wiegand, the museum's director at that time, followed the ideas of Wilhelm von Bode, who had in mind a great "German Museum" in the style of the British Museum. But there was obviously no overall concept, and given the reigning idea of a major architecture museum presenting examples of all Ancient Near Eastern and Mediterranean cultures, the display of the altar had to be condensed. Up until the end of World War II, only the eastern part of the museum with the three large architecture galleries was called the "Pergamon Museum".

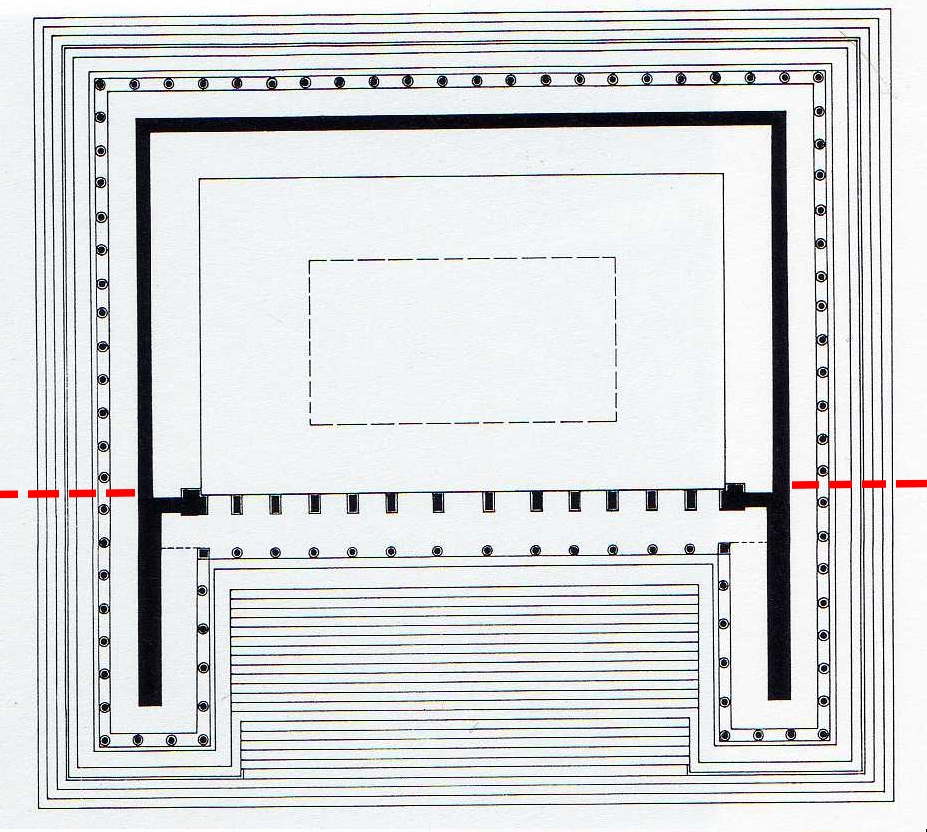
Reconstructed ground plan of the entire Pergamon Altar

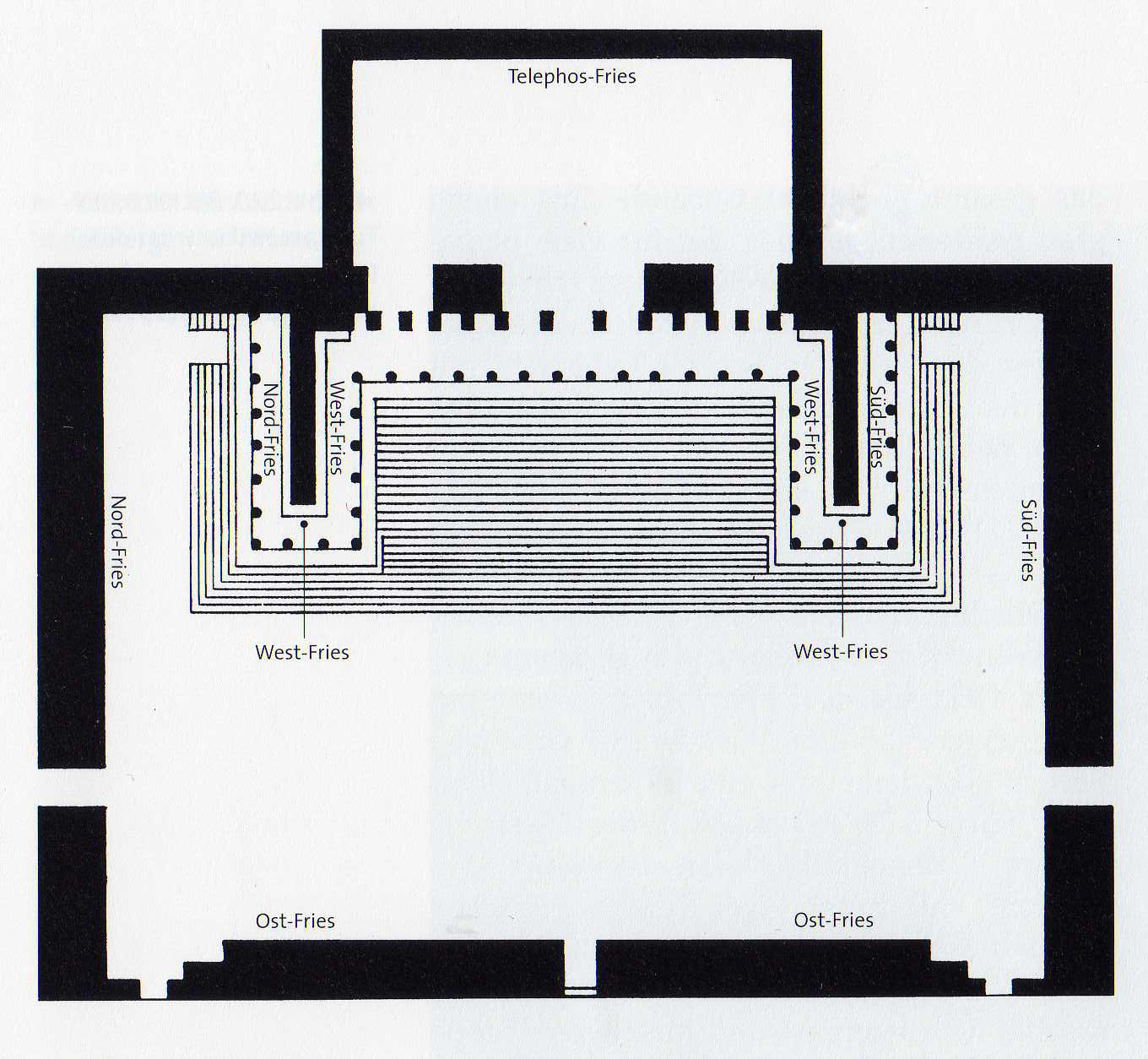
Ground plan of the altar as modified for presentation in the Pergamon Museum

In 1939 the museum closed because of World War II. Two years later the reliefs were taken down and stored elsewhere. At the end of the war, the pieces of the altar which had been placed in an air-raid shelter near the Berlin zoo fell into the hands of the Red Army and were taken to the Soviet Union as war trophies. They were stored in the depot of the Hermitage Museum in Leningrad until 1958. In 1959 a large part of the collection was returned to East Germany (GDR), including the altar fragments. Under the leadership of the museum's then director, Carl Blümel, only the altar was presented as it had been before the war. The other antiquities were newly arranged, not least because the Altes Museum had been destroyed. In October of that year the museum reopened. In 1982 a new entrance area was created which permitted a visit to the museum to begin with the Pergamon Altar. Previously, the entrance had been in the west wing of the building, so that visitors had to pass through the Vorderasiatisches Museum Berlin (Middle East Museum) to get to the Pergamon Altar. In 1990, nine heads from the Telephus frieze, which had been evacuated to the western part of Berlin because of the war, returned to the Pergamon Museum. All these war-related events had negative consequences for the remaining altar and frieze fragments. It also turned out that earlier restorations had created problems. The clamps and fasteners which connected the individual fragments and also served to anchor the frieze and sculpture to the wall were made of iron, which had started to rust. As this rust spread it threatened to crack open the marble from the inside. Restoration became urgent after 1990. From 1994 to 1996 the Telephus frieze, parts of which had not been accessible in the 1980s, was worked on. Afterward the Gigantomachy was restored under the leadership of Silvano Bertolin. First the western frieze, then the northern and southern portions, and finally the eastern frieze were restored, an effort which cost over three million euro. On June 10, 2004, the completely restored frieze was presented for public viewing. The Pergamon altar can now be viewed in a form reflecting current scientific insights.

In 1998 and again in 2001 the Turkish Minister of Culture, Istemihan Talay, demanded the return of the altar and other artifacts. However, this demand did not have an official character and would not have been enforceable under today's standards. In general, the Staatliche Museen Berlin (Berlin state museums) as well as other museums in Europe and the United States rule out, with few exceptions, the possible return of antique objects of art. Today, most of the altar foundation as well as several wall remnants are at the original location. Also in Turkey are several smaller portions of the frieze which were found later.

== Construction and design ==
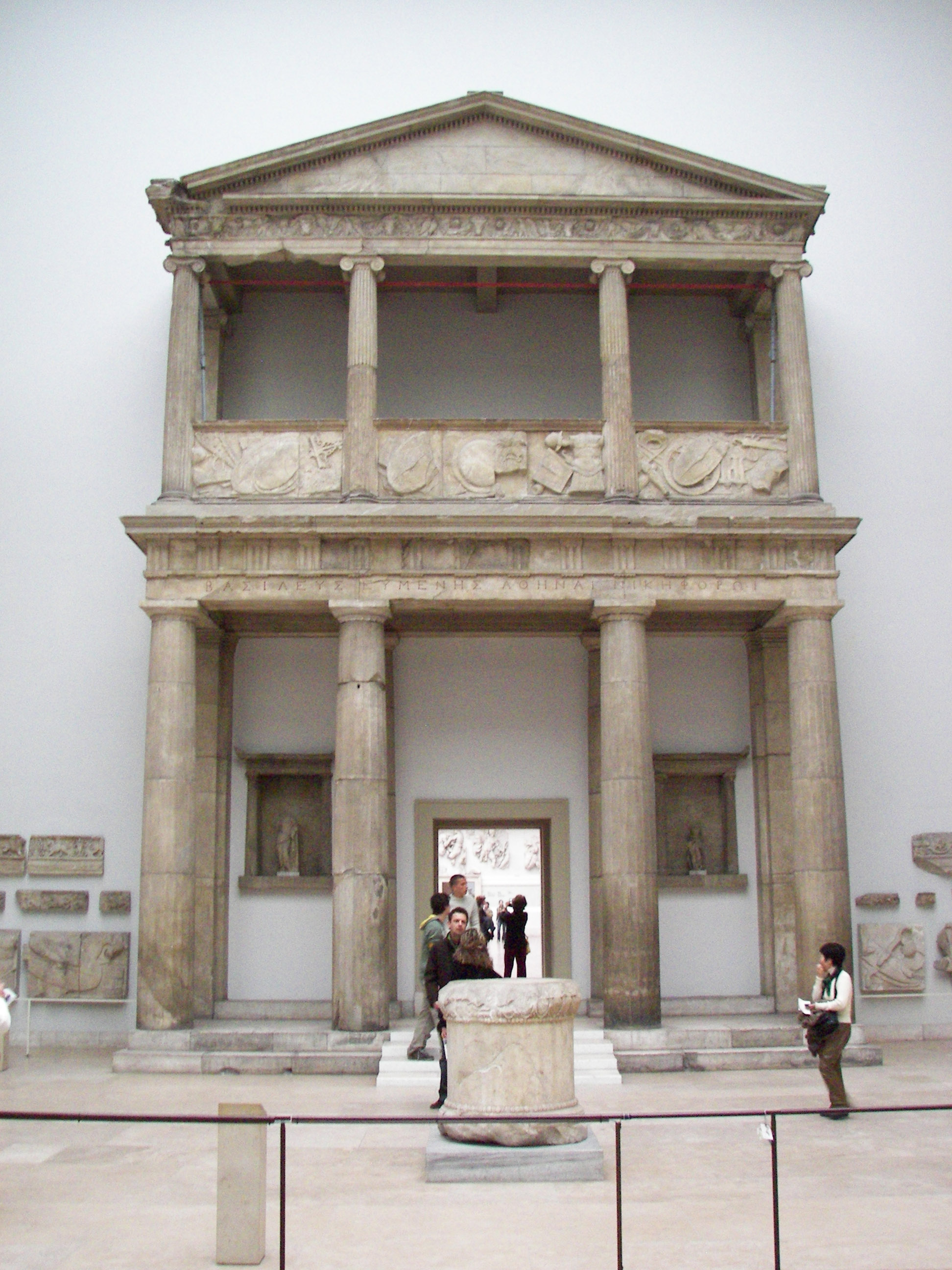
Reconstructed entranceway to the Pergamene Athena temple, originally on the terrace above the altar and now in the Berlin Pergamon Museum

Earlier versions of the altar were leveled in Pergamon, and to enhance the utility of the acropolis several terraces were laid out. The path connecting the lower part of the town with the acropolis led directly past the self-contained and now extended sacred altar area, which could be accessed from the east. Thus visitors in antiquity first saw the frieze on the eastern face of the altar, on which the chief Greek gods were portrayed. First, at the right (northern) side of the eastern frieze, Hera, Heracles, Zeus, Athena and Ares were shown engaged in battle. In the background to the right there was not only the wall of another terrace, presumably containing many statues; the visitor also viewed the simple Doric Athena temple which had been erected 150 years earlier on the terrace above. The western side of the altar with the stairway was in alignment with the Athena temple, despite the elevation difference. It was probably the case that the altar arose in direct relationship to the redesigning of the acropolis and was to be regarded as a primary, new construction and votive offering to the gods. In its freely accessible arrangement the altar was conceived so that visitors could walk around it. This inevitably led to further intended lines of sight.

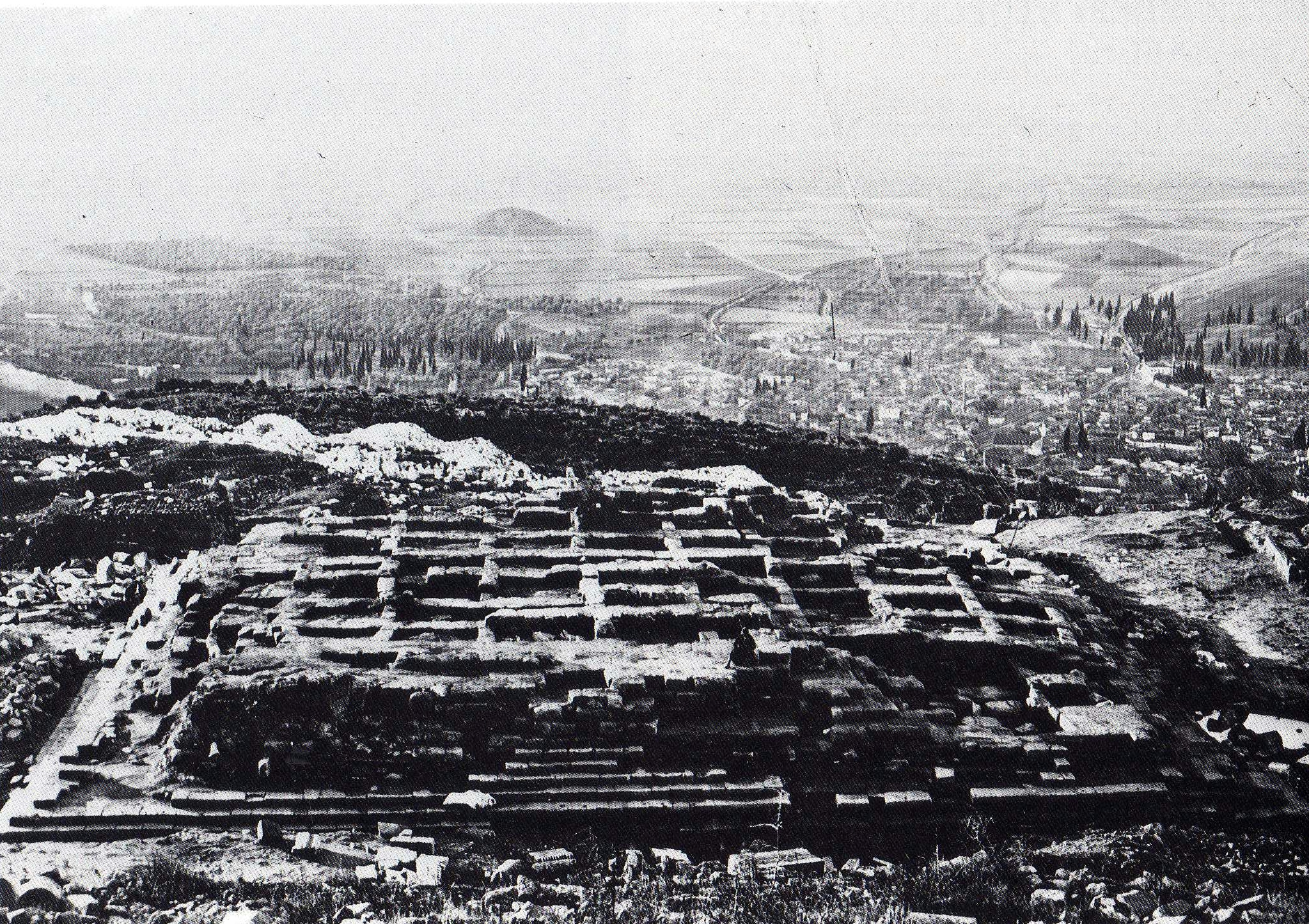
Foundation of the Pergamon Altar after excavation, c. 1880

The shape of the altar was almost a square. In this respect it followed Ionic models, which specified a wall enclosing the actual sacrificial altar on three sides. On the open side the altar could be accessed via a stairway. For cultic reasons such altars were usually oriented toward the east so that those bringing sacrifices entered the altar from the west. The Pergamene altar follows this tradition, but to a truly monumental extent. The huge, almost square base was 35.64 meters wide and 33.4 meters long and included five steps surrounding the entire structure. The stairway on the western side is almost 20 meters wide and intersects with the lower level, which itself is almost six meters high. The core of the foundation is composed of intersecting tuff walls arranged like a grating, which increased earthquake stability. This foundation is still preserved and can be examined on site in Pergamon. The upper visible structure consisted of a pedestal, a frieze of slabs 2.3 meters (7' 6") in height with high relief scenes, and a thick, projecting cornice. Grey-veined marble from the island of Marmara was used, which was typical for Pergamon. In addition to the Proconnesian marble of the large frieze, the Telephus frieze and the foundation, darker marble with recognizable fossil inclusions was also used for the base; it came from Lesbos-Moria.

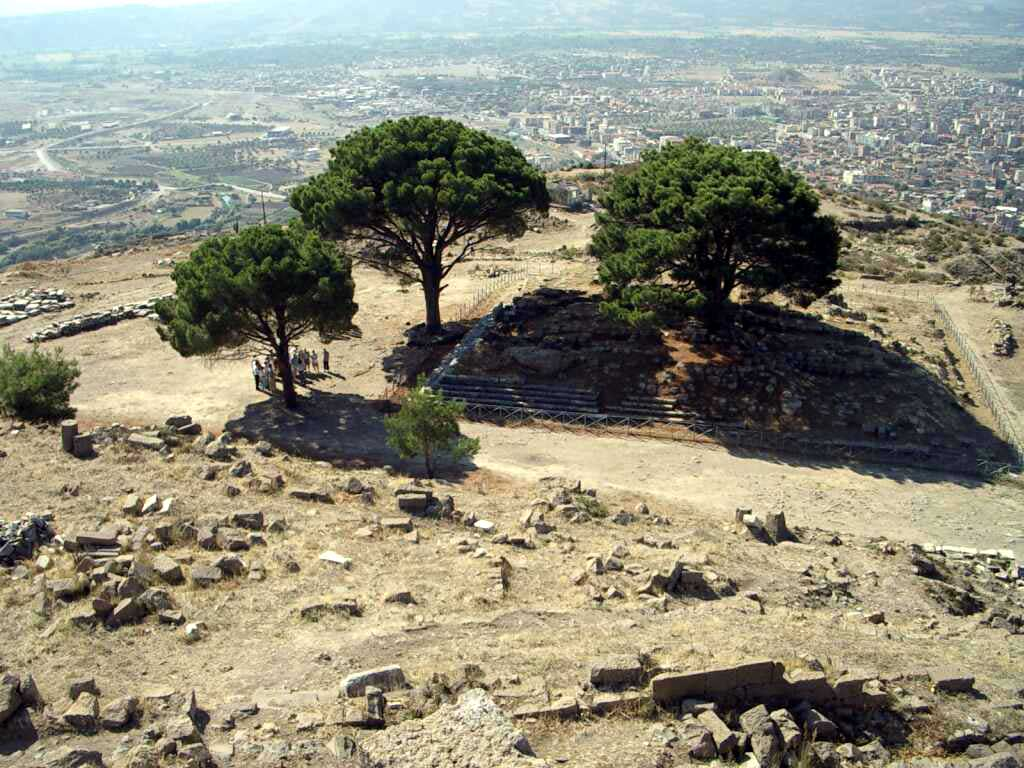
The altar foundation in Pergamon, 2005

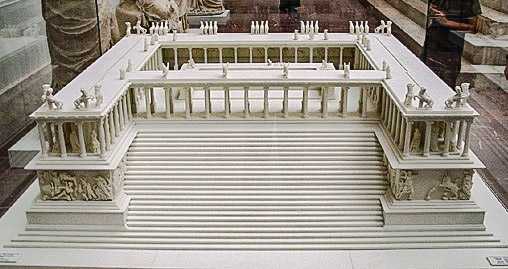
Museum model of the presumed form of the altar in antiquity

The frieze is 113 meters (370'9") long, which makes it the longest surviving frieze of Greek Antiquity after the Parthenon frieze. On the western side it is interrupted by the ca. 20 meter wide stairway, which cuts into the foundation on that side and leads to a superstructure with columns. On both sides of this stairway there are projections constructed and decorated in a manner similar to the rest of the encircling frieze. The three-wing superstructure is relatively narrow compared with the base. The pillars surrounding the superstructure have platforms with profiles and Ionic capitals. There are many statues on the roof: a quadriga of horses, lion griffins, centaurs and deities, as well as uncompleted gargoyles. The upper hall gives a spacious impression thanks to the widely spaced columns. An additional columned hall was also planned for the inner courtyard where the fire altar itself was located, but not implemented. A frieze was installed there at eye level depicting the life of the mythical founder of the city, Telephus. Although no remains of paint have been found, it can be assumed that the entire structure was brightly painted in antiquity.

=== Gigantomachy frieze ===
The Gigantomachy frieze depicts the cosmic battle of the Olympian gods against the Giants, the children of the primordial goddess Gaia (Earth). The gods are depicted in the frieze in accordance with their divine nature and mythical attributes. The frieze sides are described below, always proceeding from left to right.

==== East frieze ====
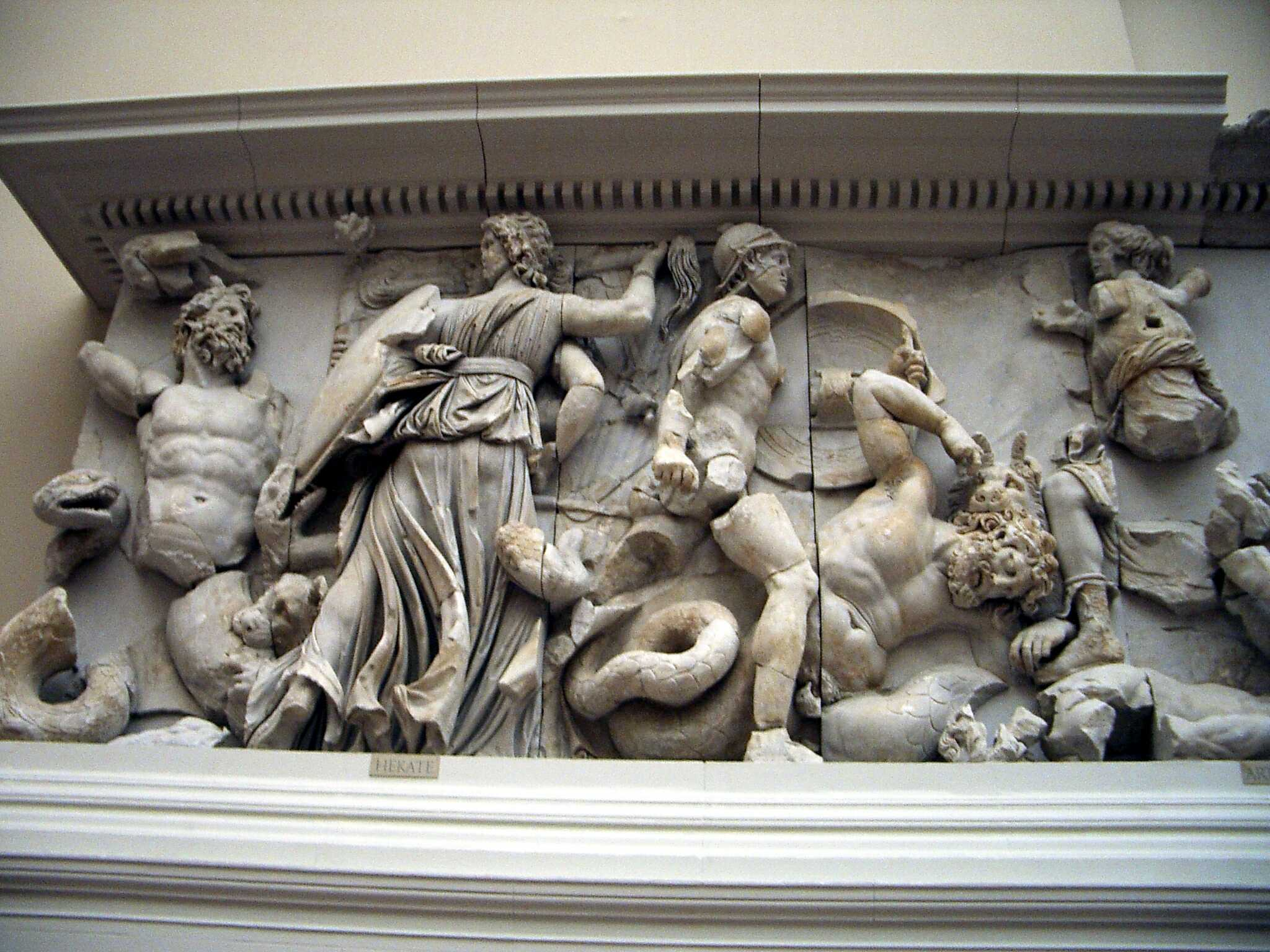
Hecate fights against Clytius (left); Artemis against Otos (right)

As mentioned above, visitors first saw the eastern side as they entered the altar area. Here was where almost all of the important Olympian gods were assembled. On the left the presentation begins with the three-faceted goddess Hecate. She fights in her three incarnations with a torch, a sword and a lance against the Giant Clytius. Next to her is Artemis, the goddess of the hunt; in keeping with her function she fights with a bow and arrow against a Giant who is perhaps Otos. Her hunting dog kills another Giant with a bite to the neck. Artemis' mother Leto fights at her side thrusting a large torch against a winged Giant with avian claws, apelike face and snake tail, maybe Tityos; at her other side her son and Artemis' twin, Apollo, fights. Like his sister, he is armed with bow and arrow and has just shot the Giant Udaios, who lies at his feet.

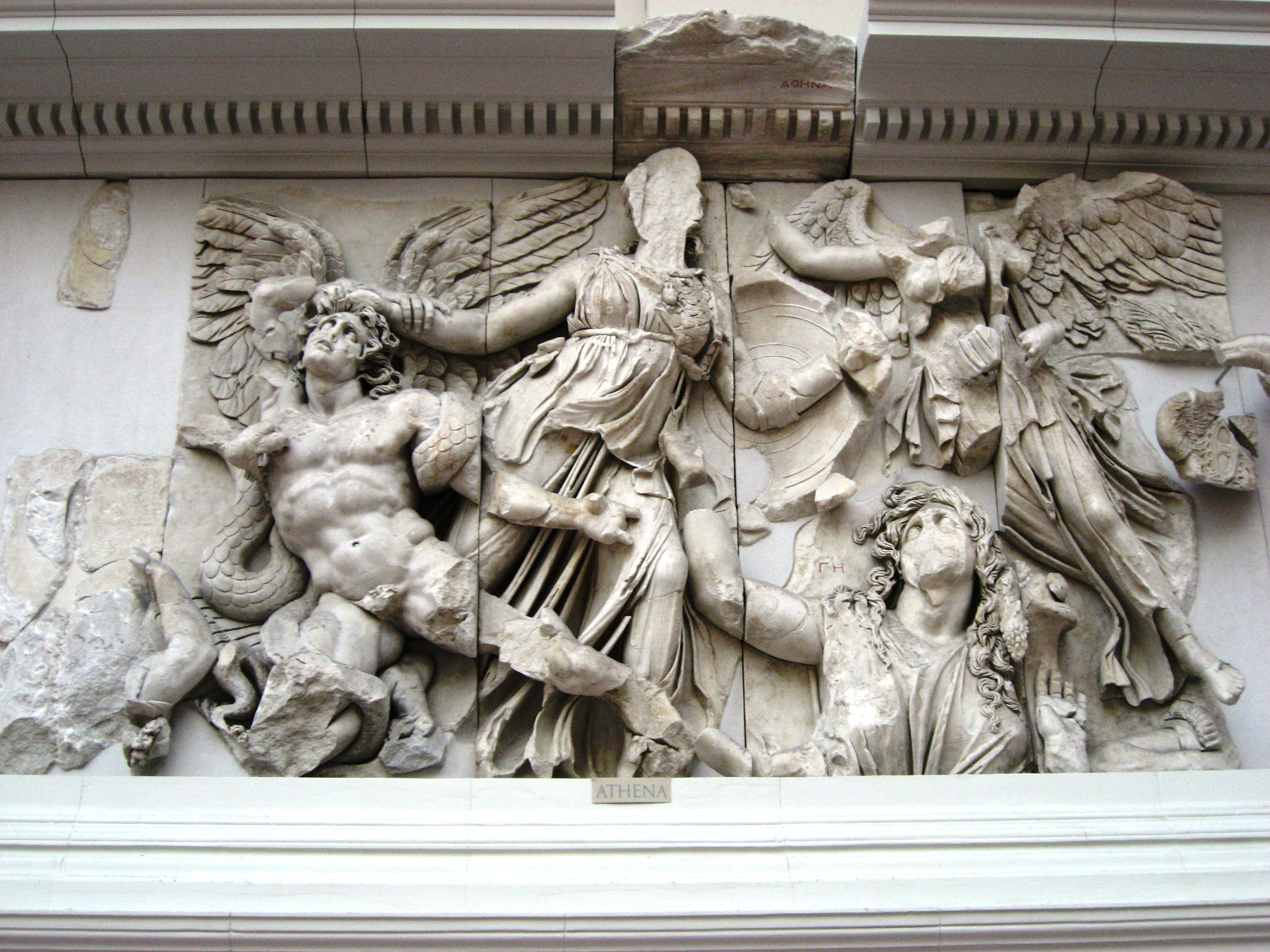
Athena and Nike fight Alkyoneus (left), Gaia rises up from the ground (right)

The next relief panel has barely survived. It is supposed that it showed Demeter. She is followed by Hera, entering the battle in a quadriga. Her four winged horses are identified as the personifications of the four winds, Notus, Boreas, Zephyrus and Eurus. Between Hera and his father Zeus, Heracles is fighting, identified only by a frieze fragment showing a paw of his lion pelt. Zeus is physically especially present and agile. He fights by hurling lightning bolts, sending rain and massed clouds not only against two young Giants but also against their leader, Porphyrion. The next pair of fighters also shows an especially important battle scene. Athena, the city goddess of Pergamon, breaks the Giant Alkyoneus’ contact to the earth, from which the mother of the Giants, Gaia, emerges. According to legend, Alkyoneus was immortal only as long as he touched the ground, where the power of his mother could flow through him. The eastern frieze concludes with Ares, the god of war, who goes into battle with a chariot and pair of horses. His horses rear up in front of a winged Giant.

==== South frieze ====
The depiction of the fighting begins here with the great mother goddess of Asia Minor, Rhea/Cybele. With bow and arrow she rides into battle on a lion. On the left can be seen the eagle of Zeus holding a bundle of lightning bolts in his claws. Next to Rhea, three of the immortals fight with a mighty, bull-necked Giant. The first, a goddess, has not been identified; she is followed by Hephaestus, who raises a two-headed hammer aloft. He is followed by another unidentified, kneeling god who thrusts a spear into the body.

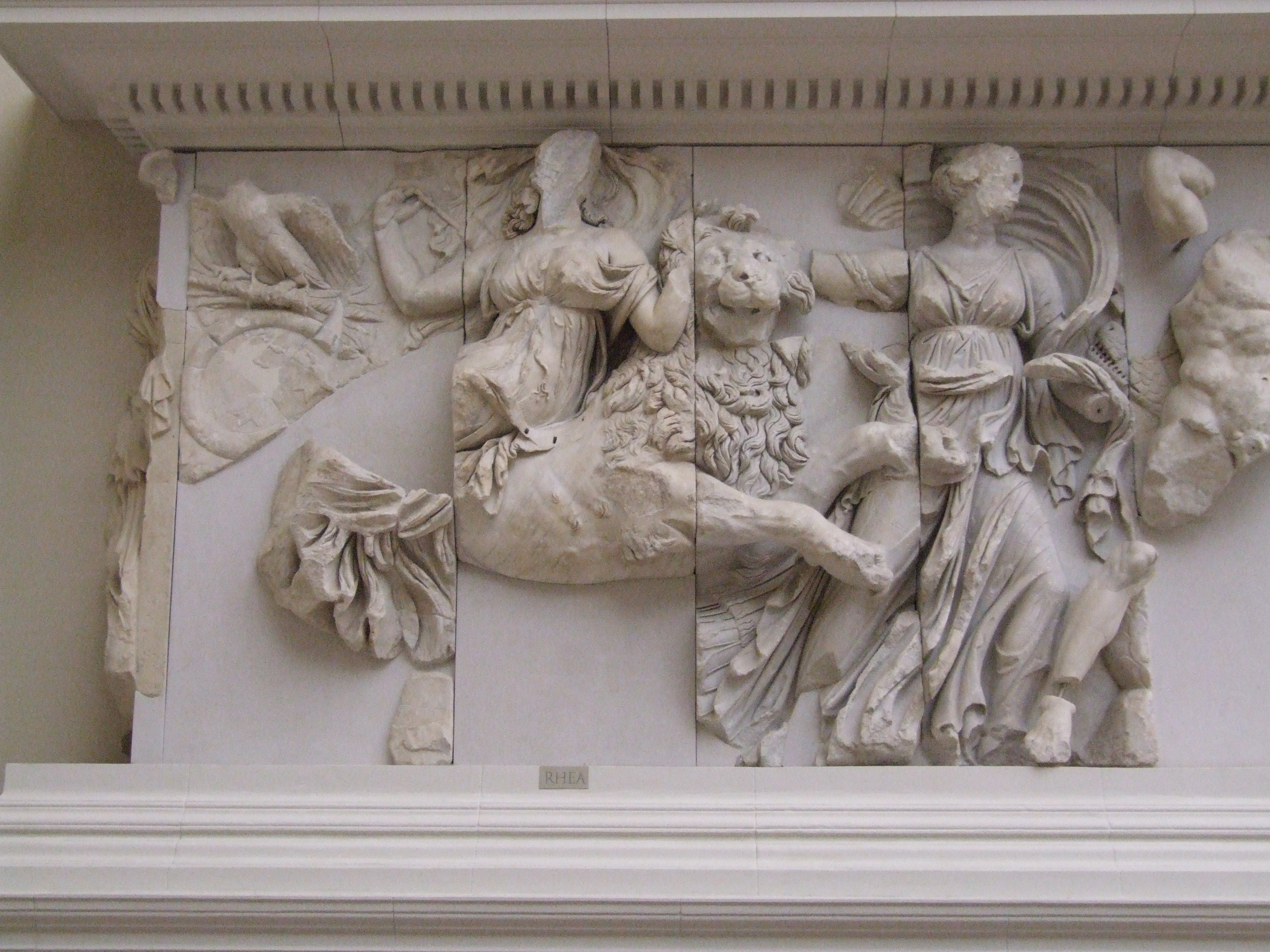
Rhea/Cybele riding on a lion, Andrasteia (?)

Next come the gods of the heaven. Eos, goddess of the dawn, rides sidesaddle into battle. She pulls back her horse and is armed with a torch which she thrusts forward. She is followed by Helios, who rises up from the ocean with his quadriga and enters the battle armed with a torch. His target is a Giant standing in his way. He has rolled over another Giant. Theia follows, amidst her children. She is the mother of the day and night stars. Next to her mother and with her back to the viewer, the moon goddess Selene rides on her mule over a Giant.

In the last third of the south frieze an unidentified young god, possibly Aether, is fighting. He is holding in a stranglehold a Giant with snake legs, human body, and the paws and head of a lion. The next god is obviously elderly. It is supposed that he is Uranus. On his left is his daughter Themis, goddess of justice. At the end (or beginning, depending how the frieze is viewed) is the Titan Phoebe with a torch and her daughter Asteria with a sword. Both are accompanied by a dog.

==== West frieze (left side, at the north risalit) ====
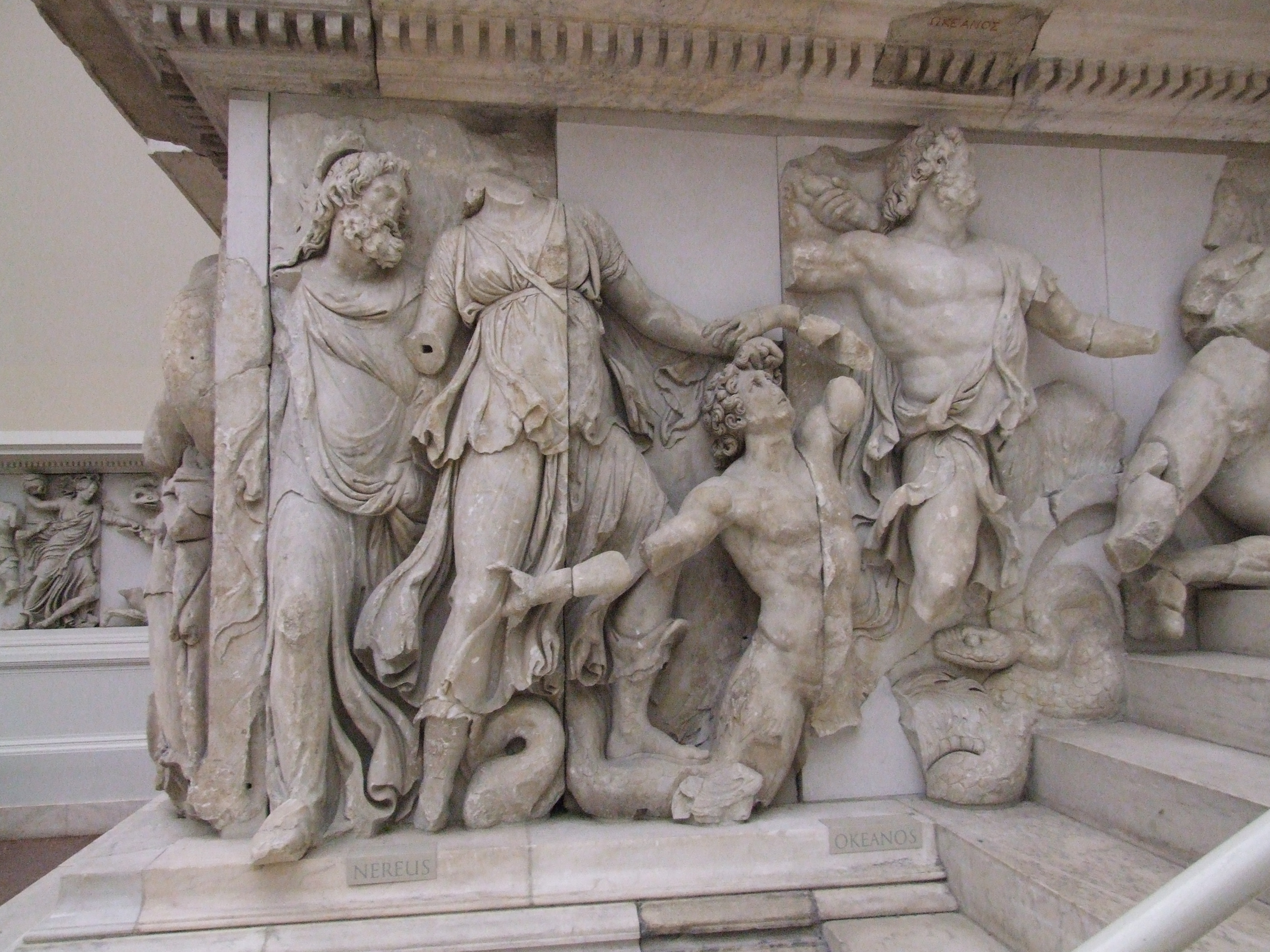
Left to right: Nereus, Doris, a Giant, and Oceanus

The ocean gods are gathered together on the north risalit of the altar. On the western wall (risalit front) Triton and his mother Amphitrite fight several Giants. Triton's upper torso is human; the front half of his lower torso is a horse, the back half a dolphin. On the inside wall (stairway) are to be found the couple Nereus and Doris as well as Oceanus, and a fragment supposed to be Tethys, all of whom are engaged in fighting Giants.

==== West frieze (right side, at the south risalit) ====
Several gods of nature and mythological beings are gathered on the south risalit. On the risalit front, Dionysus, accompanied by two young satyrs joins the struggle. At his side is his mother Semele, leading a lion into battle. Fragments of three nymphs are shown on the stairway side. Here, too, is the only artist's signature found, THEORRETOS, on the cornice.

==== North frieze ====
Aphrodite starts off the line-up of the gods on this side, and since one has to imagine the frieze as continuous, she is to be found next to her lover Ares, who concludes the east frieze. The goddess of love pulls a lance out of a dead Giant. Next to her, her mother, the Titan Dione, is fighting, as well as her small son, Eros. The next two figures are uncertain. They are most likely the twins Castor and Pollux. Castor is being grabbed from behind by a Giant who bites him in the arm, whereupon his brother hastens to his assistance.

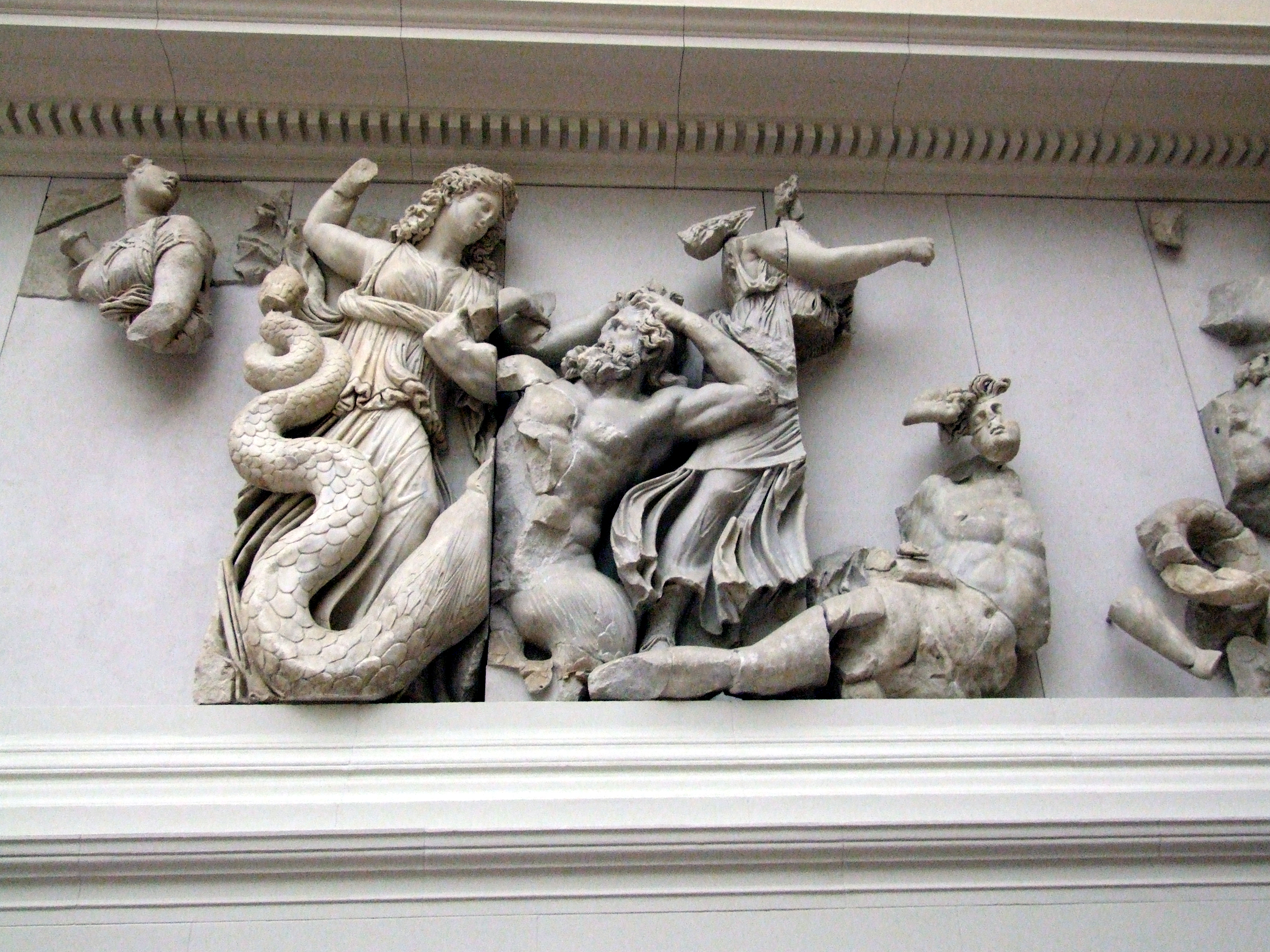
The three Moirai club Giants Agrios and Thoas to death

The next three pairs of fighters are associated with Ares, the god of war. It is uncertain who they depict. First, a god is about to hurl a tree trunk; in the middle a winged goddess thrusts her sword into an opponent, and third, a god fights a Giant in armor. The next god was long considered to be Nyx; in the meantime it is assumed that it is one of the Erinyes, goddesses of revenge. She is holding a vessel wrapped in snakes, ready to hurl it. Next, two other personifications are fighting. The three Moirai (goddesses of fate) kill the Giants Agrios and Thoas (or Thoon) with bronze clubs.

The next group of fighters shows a "lion goddess" said to be Ceto. This group does not immediately follow the Moirai; there is a gap which probably held another pair of fighters. They may have been Ceto's children, the Graeae. Ceto was the mother of several monsters, including a whale (Greek: Ketos) who rises at her feet. The north frieze closes with the god of the sea Poseidon, who rises up out of the ocean with a team of seahorses. The next scene in the sequence is the north risalit with the ocean gods.

=== Telephus frieze ===
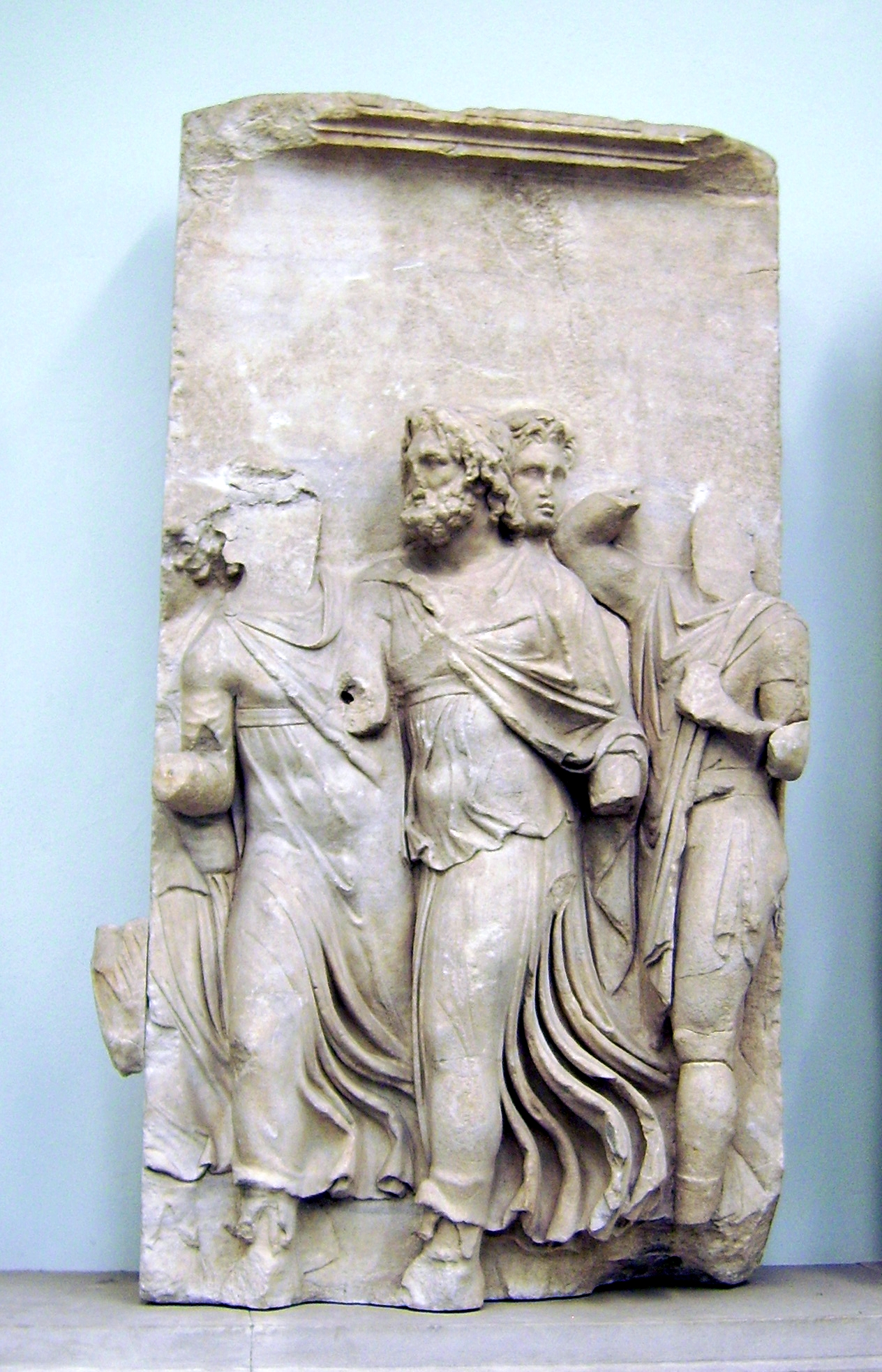
King Teuthras finds Auge stranded on the shore, panel 10

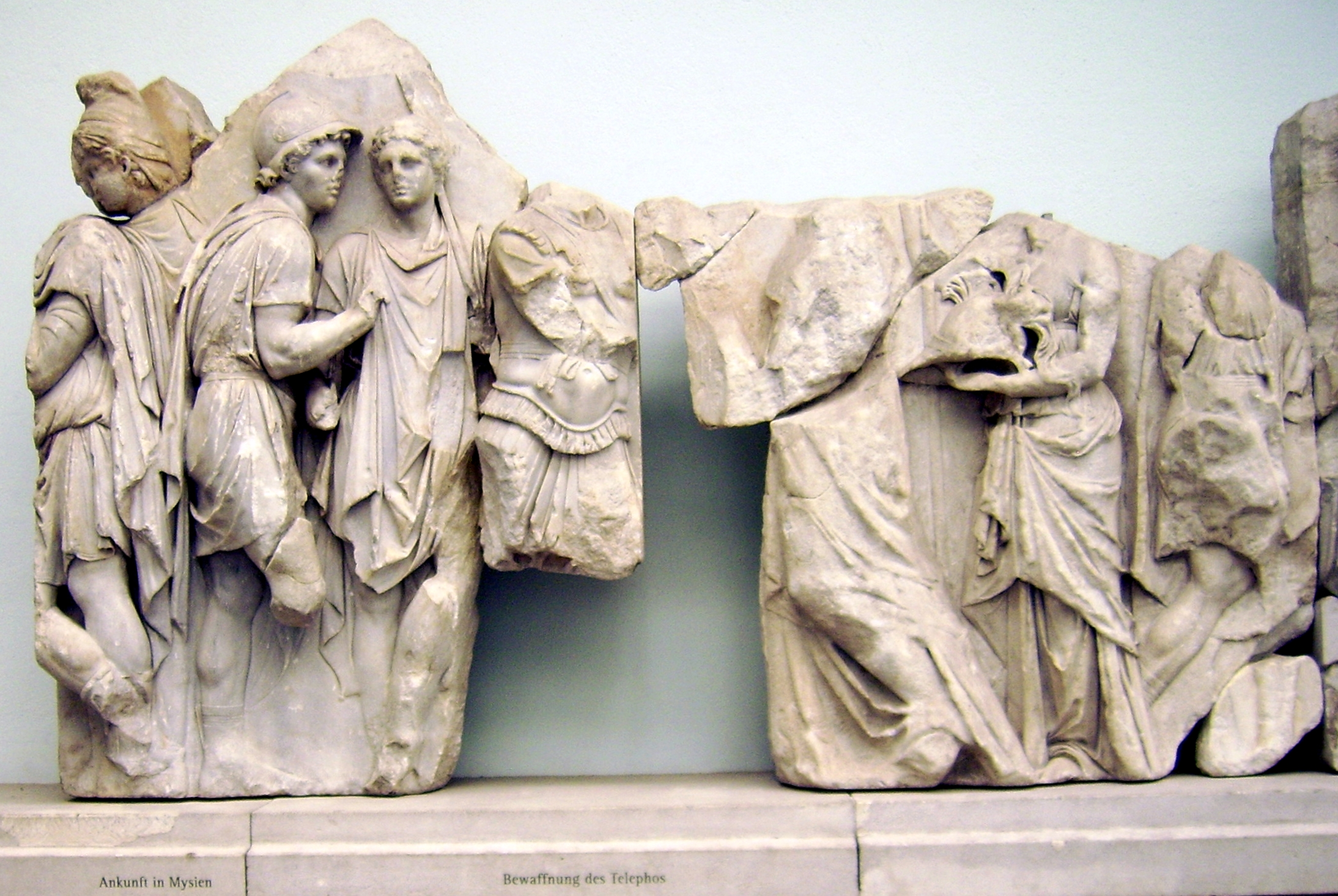
Telephus receives weapons from Auge, panels 16 and 17

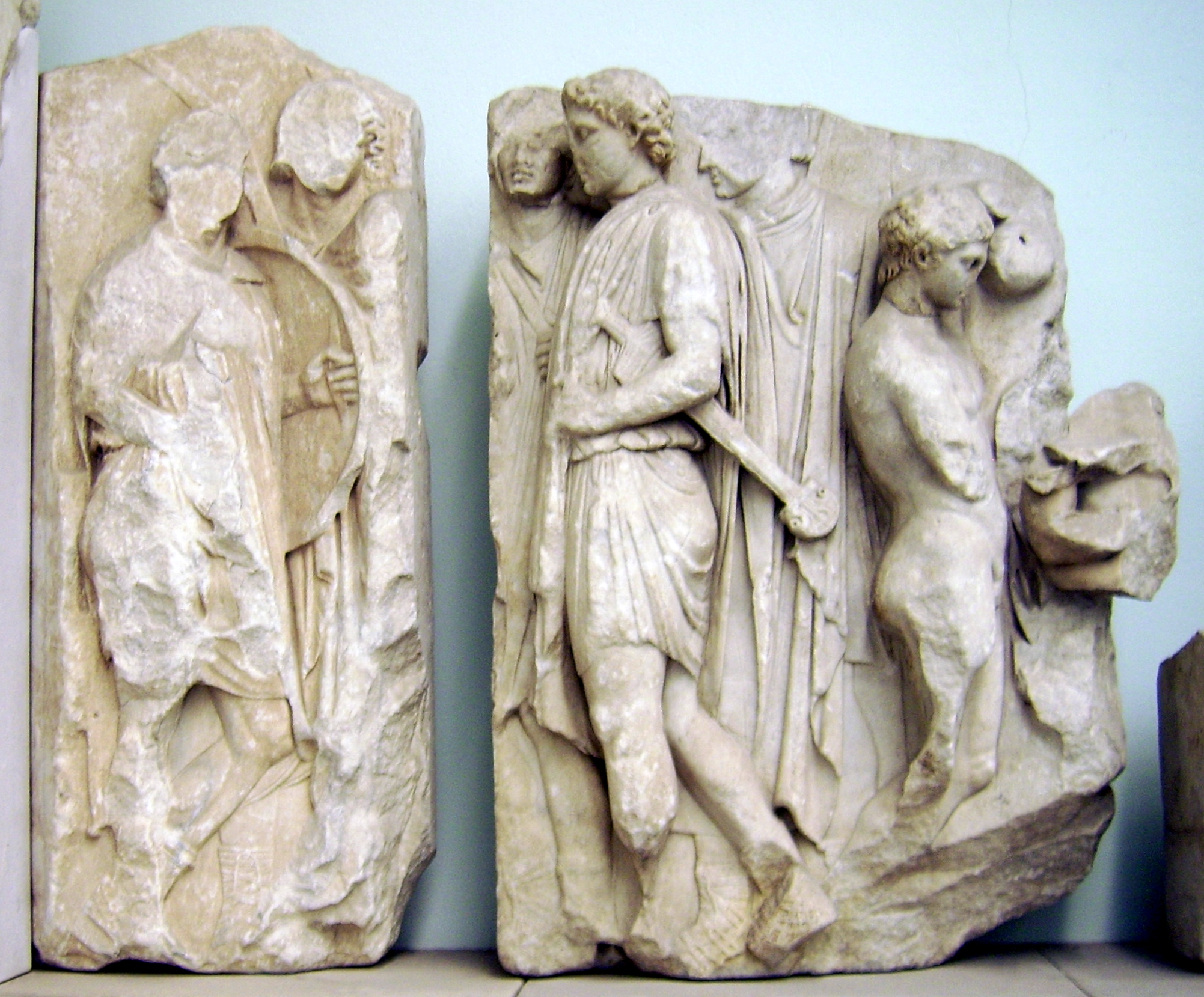
The Argives welcome Telephus, panels 36 and 38

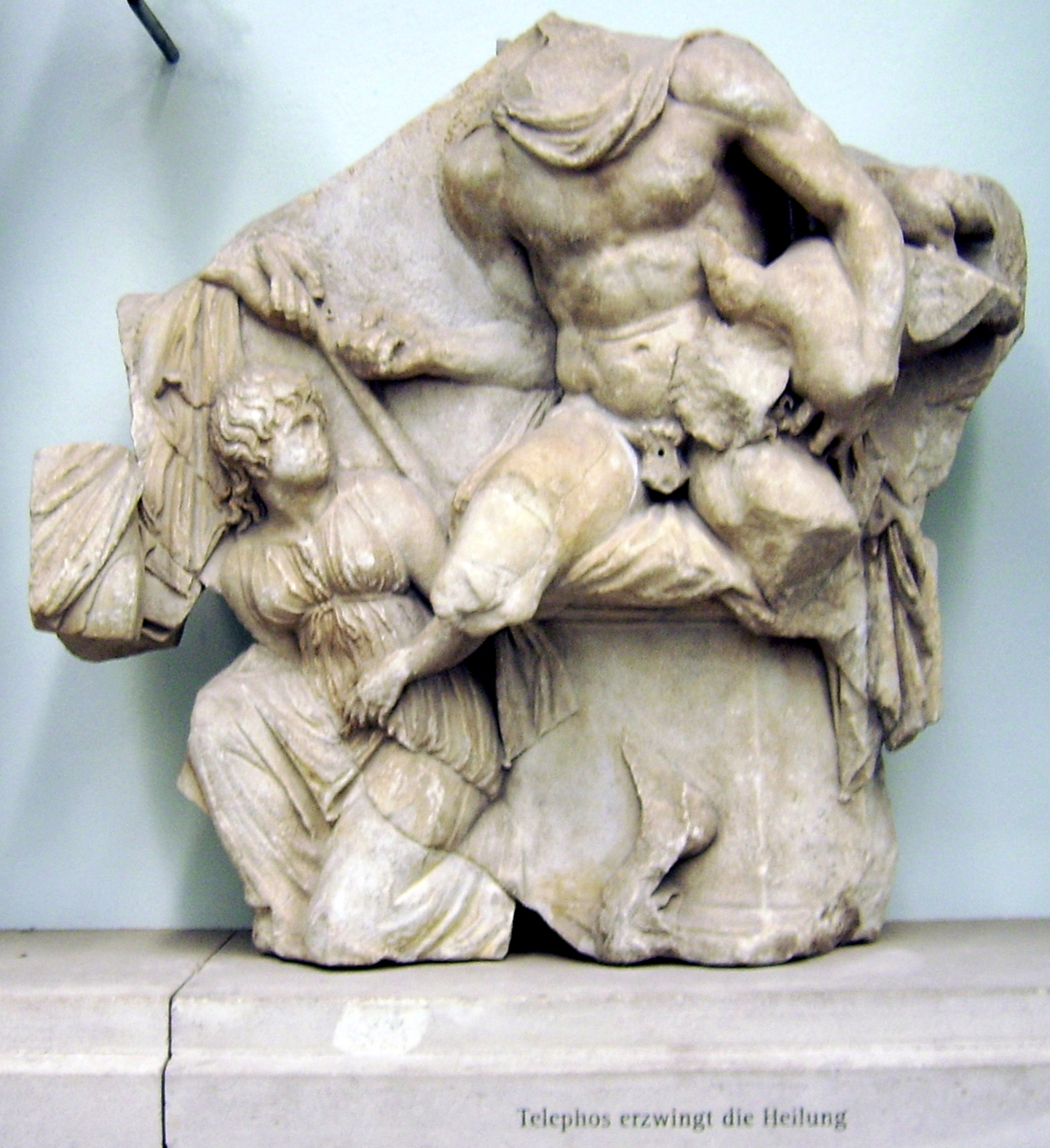
Telephus threatens to kill Orestes, panel 42

The frieze narrates in chronological order the life of Telephus, one of the heroes of Greek mythology; the legend is also known from written records, for example in the tragedies of Aeschylus, Sophocles and Euripides from the 5th century BC.

Since there was only a limited amount of space available in the upper, internal courtyard where the actual fire altar was located, the Telephus frieze was sculpted on slabs that were shallower than in the case of the Gigantomachy. Its dimensions were also more modest and its arrangement was on a smaller scale. The height was 1.58 meters. The frieze was originally painted, but no significant traces of color remain. There were several technical innovations for the time: the figures are staggered in depth; architectural elements are used to indicate activities taking place indoors, and the landscapes are lush and scenic. These new ways of depicting spatial arrangements set the tone for Late Hellenistic and Roman times.

After restoration in the mid-1990s it was discovered that the formerly assumed chronological sequence was in some cases incorrect. The installation was accordingly rearranged, but the original numbering of the 51 relief panels in the Pergamon Museum was retained. For example, the resorting led to moving what had formerly been regarded as the first panel to a location following panel 31. Not all panels survived, so there are a few gaps in the presentation of the story. (Of the original 74 panels, only about 47 whole or partial panels survived. Panels 37 and 43 are not on display as part of the frieze for lack of space.) The following list reflects the sequence after reassembly in 1995.

Panels 2,3 - 2: At the court of King Aleus; 3: Heracles catches sight of Aleus' daughter Auge in the temple

Panels 4,5,6 – 4: The infant Telephus is abandoned in the wilderness; 5 and 6: carpenters construct a boat in which Auge is to be cast adrift.

Panel 10 – King Teuthras finds Auge stranded on the shore

Panel 11 – Auge establishes an Athena cult

Panel 12 – Heracles identifies his son Telephus

Panels 7, 8 – Nymphs bathe the infant Telephus

Panel 9 – Telephus' childhood

Panels 13, 32, 33 and 14 – Telephus voyages by ship to Mysia in Asia Minor

Panels 16 and 17 – Telephus receives weapons from Auge

Panel 18 – Telephus goes to war against Idas

Panel 20 – Teuthras gives Auge to Telephus in marriage

Panel 21: Mother and son recognize each other on the wedding night

Panels 22-24 – Nireus kills the Amazon Hiera, Telephus' wife

Panel 51 – The fighting is interrupted for Hiera's solemn funeral

Panel 25 – Two Scythian warriors fall in battle

Panel 28 – The battle at the Kaikos springs

Panels 30, 31 – Achilles wounds Telephus with the help of Dionysus

Panel 1 – Telephus consults an oracle about the healing of his wound

Panels 34 and 35 – Telephus lands in Argos

Panels 36 and 38 – The Argives welcome Telephus

Panels 39 and 40 – Telephus asks Agamemnon to heal him

Panel 42 – Telephus threatens to kill Orestes, whom he took hostage to force Agamemnon to heal him

Panel 43 – Telephus is healed

Panels 44-46 – The founding of cults in Pergamon

Panels 49 and 50 – An altar is erected

Panel 47, 48 – Women hasten to the hero Telephus, who lies on a kline

=== Collection of statues ===
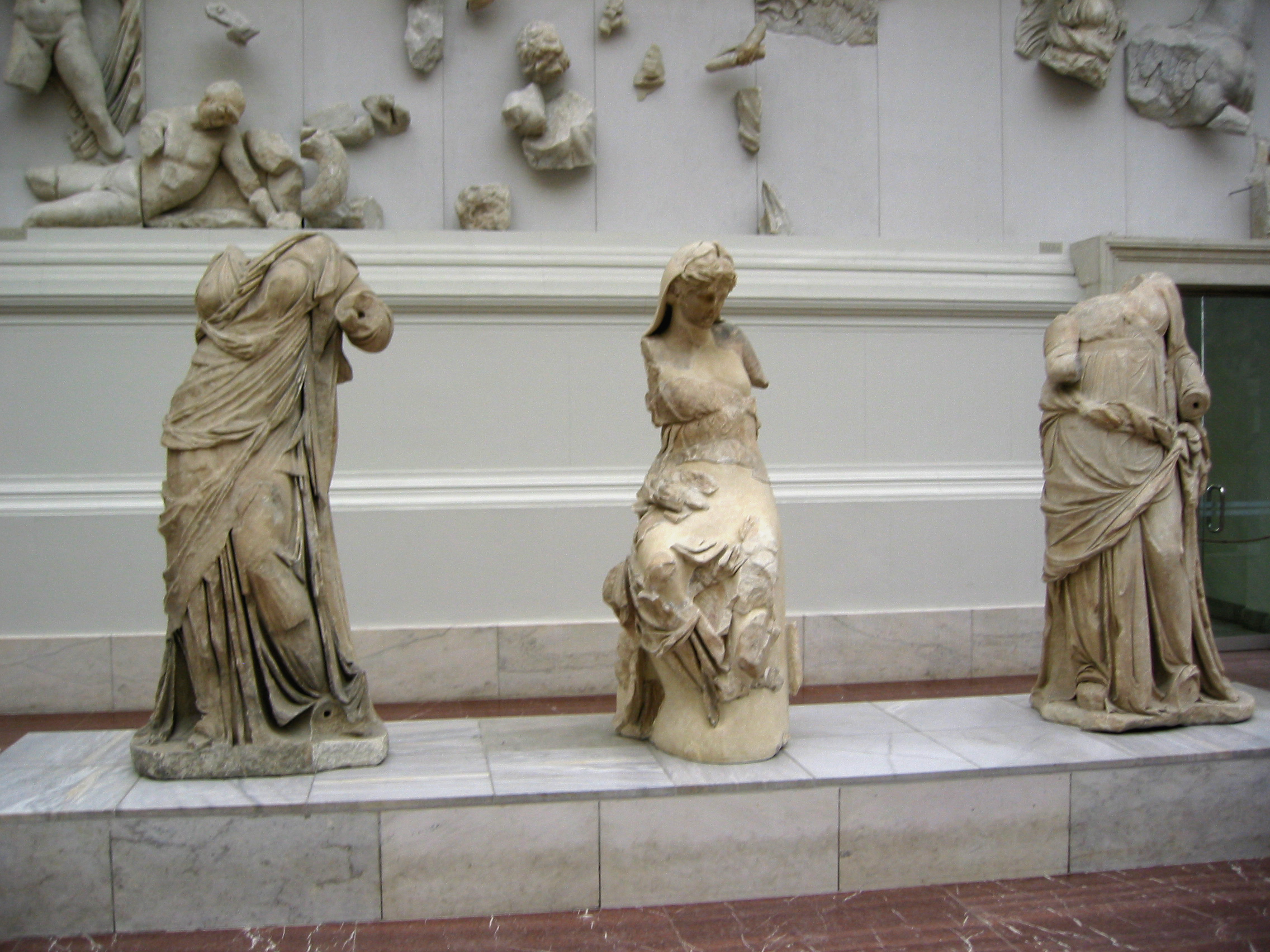
Three unidentified figures from the altar area, now in the Pergamon Museum

On the roof of the altar there were various small statues of gods, teams of horses, centaurs, and lion griffins. The finds have not yet been unambiguously described by archaeologists as to their function and placement. On the north wall of the altar sanctuary a 64 meter long pedestal was also found, richly adorned with statues. How extensively the altar area was furnished with bronze and marble statues is still unknown, but it is certain that the embellishments must have been extraordinarily rich and have represented a major expenditure for the donors.

The upper floor above the Gigantomachy housing the Telephus frieze also had an encircling portico. There were possibly additional statues between the columns. This theory is supported by 30-odd sculptures of women among the finds; they may have personified the cities of the Pergamene kingdom. It is assumed that there were no statues or other decorations on the actual fire altar, but a canopy was possibly installed there in Roman times.

== Relationship to other works of art ==
At many places in the Gigantomachy frieze, other Greek works of art can be recognized as having served as models. For example, Apollo with his idealized stance and good looks recalls a classical statue by the sculptor Leochares, produced about 150 years before the frieze and famous already in antiquity; a Roman copy has survived and is now in the Vatican Museum (the Belvedere Apollo). The important group which includes Zeus and Athena moving in opposite directions recalls the scene showing the struggle between Athena and Poseidon on the western pediment of the Parthenon. Such allusions are not accidental since Pergamon considered itself to be something like a reborn Athens.

The frieze on its part also influenced later works of classical antiquity. The most famous example is the Laokoon Group mentioned above, which was created about twenty years after the Pergamon relief, as Bernard Andreae could show. The artists who produced the statue group were in the direct tradition of the creator of the relief, or may indeed even have participated in crafting the frieze.

== Artists ==
Long discussed but so far unresolved is the question of how many artists participated in producing the Gigantomachy. Just as disputed is the extent to which the character of individual artists can be identified in this work of art. There is agreement that at least the basic design of the frieze was the work of a single artist. In view of its consistency down to the level of details, the plan must have been worked out to its smallest elements; nothing had been left to chance. Already in the arrangement of the fighting groups it can be noted that each group is unique and, for example, that the hairstyle and the footwear of the goddesses always differ. Each of the pairs of fighters is individually arranged. Thus, the figures in themselves reveal their distinctive character rather than this being the result of the artists' personal styles.

Although scholars have certainly ascertained differences that can be attributed to individual artists, given the coherence of the whole frieze it is remarkable that these differences are almost irrelevant when the work is viewed in its entirety. According to this interpretation, artists from all over Greece deferred to the plans of a single artist with overall authority. This is substantiated, for example, by the inscriptions of artists from Athens and Rhodes. The sculptors were permitted to sign their sections of the frieze on the lower molding, but only a few such inscriptions have been found. Thus no conclusions can be drawn about the number of participating artists. Only one inscription on the south risalit survived in a manner which permitted attribution. Since there is no lower molding at that location, the name, Theorretos (ΘΕΌΡΡΗΤΟΣ), was chiseled into the marble near the portrayed god. When analyzing the various inscriptions it could be determined on the basis of the typeface that there was an older and a younger sculptor generation at work, which makes the coherence of the entire frieze all the more remarkable. Considering the 2.7 meter distance between the existing signature and the associated έπόησεν inscription (έπόησεν – "made it"), it is suspected that there was possibly another sculptor's signature in this space. If that is the case, an extrapolation suggests at least 40 participating sculptors. The front side of this risalit was signed by two sculptors, but their names did not survive.

=== Golden ratio application ===
A study by Patrice Foutakis investigated whether the ancient Greeks employed the golden ratio in their architecture. For this purpose, the measurements of 15 temples, 18 monumental tombs, 8 sarcophagi and 58 grave stelae were examined, going from the fifth century BC until the second century AD. Foutakis found that the golden ratio was totally absent from Greek architecture of the fifth century BC, and almost absent for the following six centuries. Four rare examples of golden-section proportions were identified through this research in a tower, a tomb, a grave stele and in the Great Altar of Pergamon. On the two frontal parts of the frieze facing the observer standing in front of the monument, the height to length ratio is 2.29 m to 5.17 m, that is 1:2.25, the ratio of the Parthenon. The city of Pergamon was on excellent terms with Athens, its kings venerated Attic art and offered gifts to the Parthenon, and both cities had the same goddess, Athena, as a protector.

The temple of Athena Polias Nikephoros in Pergamon, a few meters away from the Great Altar, also had a copy of the chryselephantine statue of Athena made by Phidias for the Parthenon. The two columned constructions flanking the frontal staircase of the Great Altar have the shape of two Ionic temples. The proportions of each of these temples are: width of the stylobate 4.722 m to length of the stylobate 7.66 m, ratio 1:1.62; height with the entablature 2.93 m to width of the stylobate 4.722 m, ratio 1:1.61. When the visitor came up to the top of the staircase and went through the portikon columns, he entered an interior court measuring, within the colonnade surrounding the court, 13.50 m wide by 21.60 m long, ratio 1:1.60. In other words, according to Foutakis, the artists of this Altar wanted the spectator standing on the axis in front of the staircase to see two Ionic temples following the golden ratio, and, coming through these temples, to enter a courtyard proportioned to the golden ratio. The well-known political and cultural antagonism between Pergamon and Alexandria, the city where Euclid was active and defined his geometrical proposition of the extreme and mean ratio, could have contributed to the rapid spread of this proposition to Pergamon, a city already open to new achievements in science, sculpture, architecture and politics.

== Reception ==
External videos
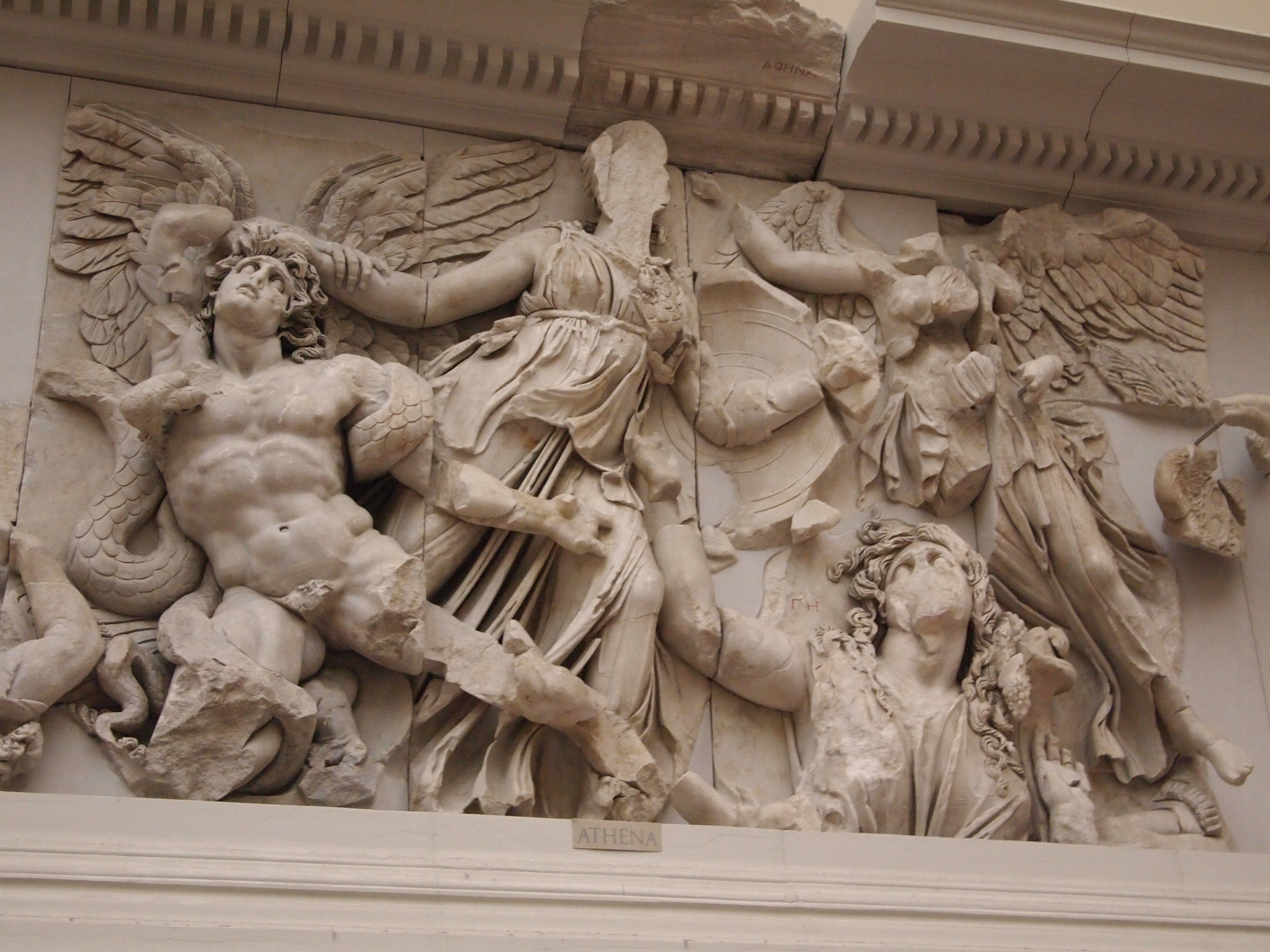
- The Pergamon Altar, Smarthistory

The German Empire, which subsidized the excavation not least for reasons of prestige, quickly began to monopolize the altar and other archaeological relics. The "Jubilee Exhibition of the Berlin Academy of Arts" in May and June 1886 devoted a 13,000 square meter site to archaeological acquisitions from recent excavations in Olympia and Pergamon. But since the Greek government had not given permission to export art treasures, no finds from Greece could be shown there. Instead, a "Temple of Pergamon" was constructed. With a true-to-scale model of the western side of the altar base containing selected copies of the frieze—including the Zeus and Athena group from the eastern frieze—an entrance area for a building was erected which resembled the Zeus temple in Olympia. Part of the exhibit was a model of the city of Pergamon in the 2nd century AD reflecting the state of knowledge at that time.

Possibly the most striking example of the reception of this work of art is the Berlin museum which has on view a reconstruction of the altar. The design of the Pergamon Museum was inspired by the gigantic form of the altar. For viewing the altar, indeed for studying this work of art in itself, the reconstruction in the Pergamon Museum came to be important. The partial reconstruction of the edifice does not however reflect what was the main side in antiquity, the eastern wall, but rather the opposite, western side with the stairway. Opinions about this reconstruction, including the installation of the rest of the frieze on the walls surrounding the central exhibition room, were not entirely favorable. Critics spoke of a frieze "turned inside out like a sleeve" and of "theatrics".

In Nazi Germany, this type of architecture later served as a model worthy of emulation. Wilhelm Kreis chose for his Soldiers' Hall at the Army High Command headquarters in Berlin (1937/38) and for a never-realized warriors' monument at the foot of Mount Olympus in Greece a building shape which was very similar to the Pergamon Altar. But for the Soldiers' Hall the frieze was limited to the front face of the risalit. The friezes by the sculptor Arno Breker were, however, never executed. Referencing this architectural form was not least in tune with the ideological concepts of the Nazis; an altar prompted ideas of being ready to sacrifice and heroic death. For the Nazis, the Pergamon Altar and Kreis' two testimonies of Nazi architecture were all "cultic buildings". The Nazis also attempted to appropriate the message behind the altar frieze, namely the victory of good over evil.

Peter Weiss begins his novel, The Aesthetics of Resistance, with a description of the Gigantomachy frieze. By way of retrospection Weiss' contemplation is also extended to include the altar's origin, history, discovery, and reconstruction in the museum.

Some of the media and population criticized the use of the Pergamon Altar as a backdrop for the application submitted by the city of Berlin to host the Olympic summer games in 2000. The Senate of Berlin had invited the members of the IOC executive committee to a banquet taking place in front of the altar. That called to mind Berlin's application to host the games in 1936. Also at that time the Nazi Minister of the Interior Wilhelm Frick had invited the members of the IOC to a banquet laid out in front of the altar.

In 2013, the Pergamon 2nd Life project, a fictional, artistically inspired photographic reconstruction of the Gigantomachy frieze, celebrated its public world premiere in the Pushkin State Museum of Fine Arts in Moscow.

== For further information ==
- Both friezes can be viewed in their entirety and in excellent quality in an interactive Flash Viewer at http://www.secondpage.de/pergamonaltar/gigantomachie.html
- Pollitt, J.J., Art in the Hellenstic Age (Cambridge 1986)
- Queyrel, François, L'Autel de Pergame. Images et pouvoir en Grèce d'Asie. Antiqua vol. 9. Paris: Éditions A. et J. Picard, 2005. ISBN 270-8-40-73-41. See Bryn Mawr Classical Review 2005.08.39.
- Ridgway, B.S. 2000. Hellenistic Sculpture II. The Styles of ca. 200-100 BC, (Madison, Wisconsin). ISBN 978-0-299-16710-3.
- Stewart, A. 2000. "Pergamon Ara Marmorea Magna. On the Date, Reconstruction, and Functions of the Great Altar of Pergamon" in N. De Grummond and B.S. Ridgway, editors, From Pergamon to Sperlonga: Sculpture and Context (Berkeley).
- Hoffmann, Herbert, "Antecedents of the Great Altar at Pergamon" The Journal of the Society of Architectural Historians 11.3 (October 1952), pp. 1–5.
- Thomas Cramer, Klaus Germann, Wolf-Dieter Heilmeyer: Marble objects from Asia Minor in the Berlin Collection of Classical Antiquities: stone characteristics and provenance − In: Yannis Maniatis (ed.): ASMOSIA VII. The Study of Marble and Other Stones in Antiquity – Proceedings of the 7th International Conference of the Association for the Study of Marble and Other Stones in Antiquity. Bulletin de Correspondance Hellénique, Vol. Supplèment 51, Athen 2009, ISSN 0007-4217, pp. 371–383.
