= Pergamon 2nd Life =

Art installation by Andrey Alexander and Angelika Gebhard

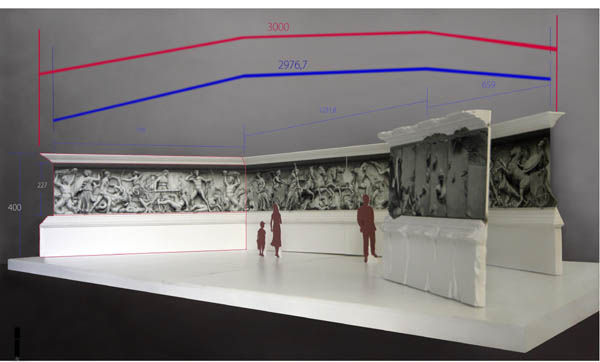
Model of the photographic installation Pergamon 2nd Life extending over 30 m (98 feet) in length and up to 4 m (13 feet) high.

Pergamon 2nd Life is a joint art project created by the author, mime artist, and photographer Andrey Alexander from Moscow, Russia, together with the author, circumnavigator, and producer Angelika Gebhard from Bad Wiessee, Germany. In a photographic installation extending over 30 m (98 feet) in length and up to 4 m (13 feet) high they recreated the missing parts of the Gigantomachy frieze of the Pergamon Altar.

== Artistically inspired reconstruction ==
The fragments of the Great Altar, which were excavated by archeologists under the direction of Carl Humann in the area of ancient Pergamon in 1878, have numerous empty surfaces. The missing parts and figures of the gods and giants depicted in the original 113 m (370 feet) Gigantomachy frieze were added by Andrey Alexander in the form of photos and drawings he had made of present-day athletes, actors, and of fragments of ancient sculptures.

In a five-year process, these photographs were then edited with respect to color, surface structure, and elaboration of the details and inserted into the gaps of the remaining marble fragments. The result is a fictional, artistically inspired reconstruction of the original. Leading European archeologists and scientists were consulted for advice on the project.

== Exhibitions ==
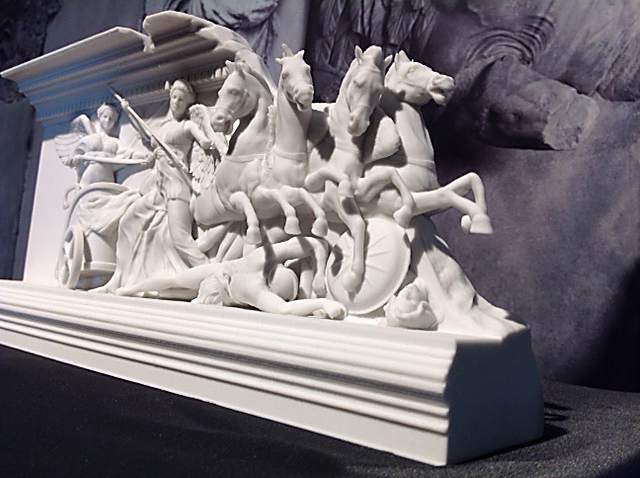
3-D reconstruction of the quadriga. Photo: Angelika Gebhard

The photographic installation celebrated its public world premiere in the Pushkin State Museum of Fine Arts in Moscow from April 22, 2013, through July 21, 2013. Video and audio installations complemented the exhibition which attracted around 300,000 visitors. From June 30 through August 2, 2015, the photographic installation was exhibited in the Shchusev Museum of Architecture in Moscow. For the first time, the exhibition also included a 3-D reconstruction of the quadriga of the gigantomachy.

== Prizes ==
In 2010, the German publisher Edition Panorama released the perpetual wall calendar "Pergamon 2nd Life", which was the silver winner of the 60th Gregor International Calendar Award held in the German city of Stuttgart.
