= Statue of Theodor Mommsen =

Statue in Berlin, Germany

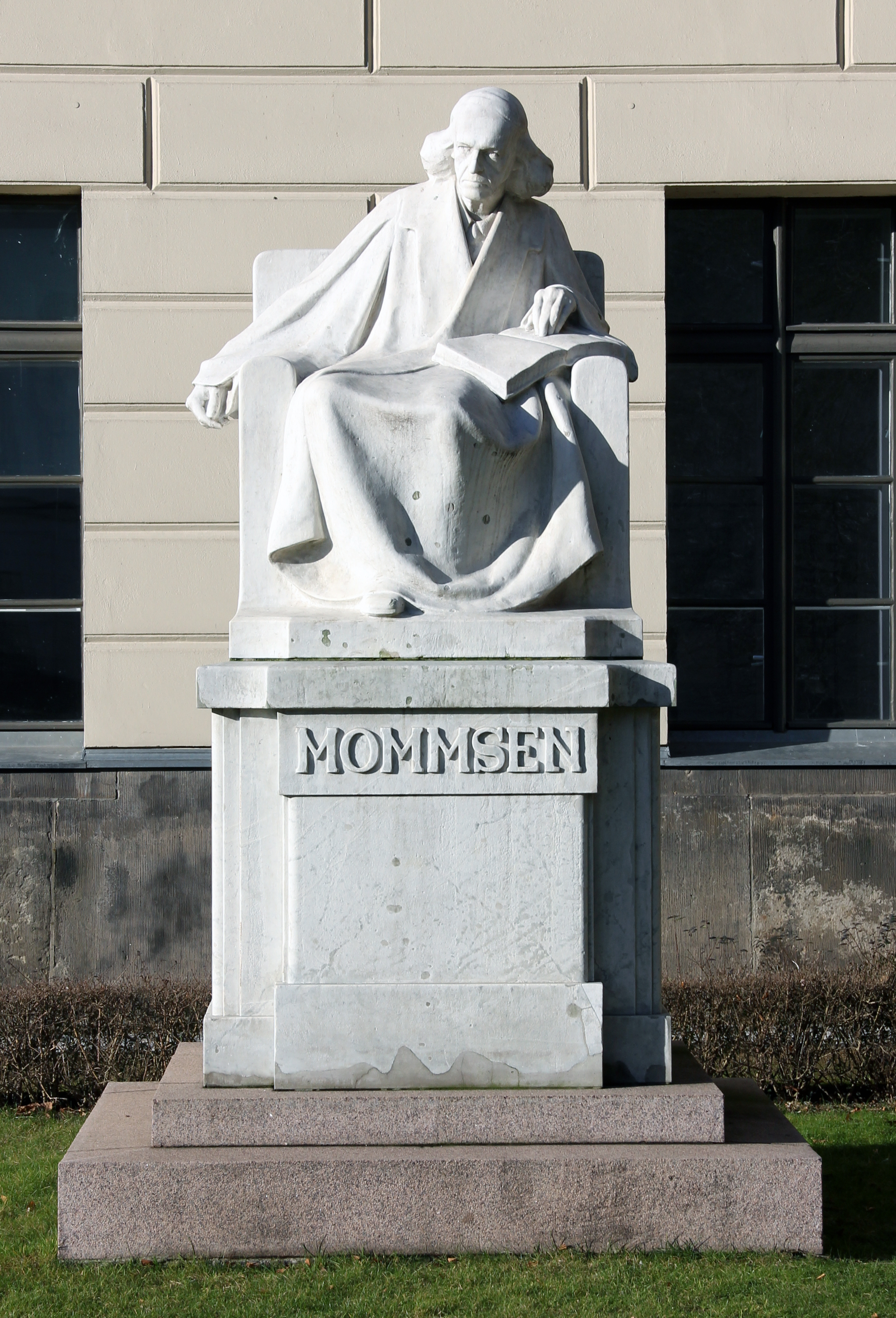
- The statue in 2015
- Artist: Adolf Brütt
- Location: Berlin, Germany; 52.5178141°N 13.3932623°E

The statue of Theodor Mommsen by Adolf Brütt is located at Humboldt University of Berlin in Berlin-Mitte, Germany.
