= Franz Koenigs =

German banker and art collector (1881–1941)

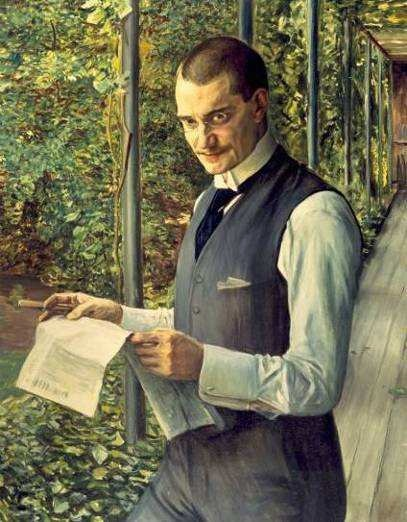
- Franz Koenigs painted by his father-in-law Leopold von Kalckreuth (1855–1928)
- Born: 3 September 1881; Kierberg, Prussia, Germany
- Died: 6 May 1941 (aged 59); Cologne, Germany
- Father: Ernst Friedrich Wilhelm Koenigs
- Family: Felix Koenigs (uncle); Wilhelm Koenigs (uncle)

Franz Wilhelm Koenigs (3 September 1881 – 6 May 1941) was a German banker and art collector.

== Biography ==
Koenigs was born on 3 September 1881 in Kierberg, Prussia, Germany, to Ernst Friedrich Wilhelm Koenigs.

Koenigs became director of banks Delbrück Schickler & Co in Berlin, Delbrück von der Heydt in Cologne, and Rhodius Koenigs in Amsterdam. He founded the latter after the first World War (1920) with two cousins from the Bunge side of the family Alfred and Felix Rhodius on Keizersgracht 119–121, Amsterdam.

Together in Paris, Koenigs collected at the age of 17, his first Jean-François-Millet drawing, the start of his Modern Art Collection. In 1914 he married Countess Anna von Kalckreuth, daughter of Leopold Graf von Kalckreuth and Bertha Countess Yorck von Wartenburg.

Koenigs moved to Berlin and then to Cologne, but in 1922, after Franz Koenigs, with his cousins, had started the Rhodius Koenigs Bank in Amsterdam, he moved his family to the Netherlands to safer grounds in Haarlem.

Paul Cassirer a German Art Dealer who saw his best client leave Berlin, (he had his portrait painted by Koenigs' father-in-law Leopold von Kalckreuth) sent in 1924 his second man, Helmuth Lütjens after him, to open up a branch of the Cassirer firm in Amsterdam. Lütjens received specific instructions to take care of this most important client. Lütjens, first staying at the Rhodius Koenigs Bank, Keizersgracht 117, found suitable housing for the gallery, just 5 houses down the canal from the Bank, on Keizersgracht 109. In this way, going to and from the Railway Station to his Bank, Franz Koenigs, their best client, had to pass the Cassirer firm twice a day.

== Franz Koenigs Modern Art Collection ==
In 1930, he lent his first collection, the Modern Art Collection consisting of Modern Paintings, Pastels and Watercolours to the Rijksmuseum in Amsterdam. The loan included works by Paul Cézanne, Jean-Baptiste Corot, Edgar Degas, Forain, Manet, Renoir and Henri de Toulouse-Lautrec.

In 1938, he instigated the move of his Modern Art Collection from the Rijksmuseum to the Stedelijk Museum Amsterdam. Its director at the time Jhr. D.C. Roëll had requested the artworks for the exhibition '100 years French Art' to be held 2 July till 25 September 1938 at the Stedelijk Museum. Franz Koenigs believed his Modern Art Collection was better suited for the Stedelijk Museum, thus it remained at the Stedelijk Museum. The French 19th century drawings, numbering 226 drawings, were part of this collection. His Modern Art Collection more suited for the Stedelijk Museum was thus transferred to the Stedelijk Museum.

== Old Master Painting and Old Master Drawing collection ==
In July 1935, the Museum Boijmans Van Beuningen in Rotterdam, opened its doors to a newly by Ad van der Steur designed building on the Mathenesserlaan in Rotterdam. Still in the old building of Museum Boijmans 'Het Schielandhuis' Franz Koenigs showed in 1934 his Dutch drawings from the 15th, 16th and 17th century. At the end of the year, December 1934 till January 1935 the Boijmans exhibited hundred French Drawings from the F. Koenigs Collection when the new museum building was ending its final stage of construction. As a patron of the Arts Franz Koenigs was looking for a museum to house his Collection of Old Master Paintings, consisting of 46 paintings of which 20 were by Rubens and 4 by Jheronimus Bosch and his Old Master Drawing Collection consisting of 2144 Drawings. In April 1935 it was announced that Franz Koenigs would lent his Old Master Painting Collection and his Old Master Drawing Collection, for a minimal period of 10 years to the new Museum Boijmans.

== Standstill Agreements ==
In 1931, the German crisis effected Rhodius Koenigs, through its partnership with Delbrück Schickler and Delbrück von der Heydt, in such that the DANAT (Darmstädter National Bank) went concourse. The Germans announced the "Stillhalteabkommen" the Standstill agreements, which was followed by the English moratorium. Germany was no longer able nor willing to further pay the reparation payments of the Georges Clemenceau agreement. On 20 June 1931 President Hoover put a one-year moratorium on payments of World War I. The Delbrück Banks through Rhodius Koenigs had outstanding orders in Britain, which were regarded as reparation payments of World War I. Those outstanding orders could no longer be paid for in Britain nor could the goods be delivered to Germany, which blocked Rhodius Koenigs trading. To circumvent Rhodius Koenigs liquidity, Franz Koenigs enlarged Rhodius Koenigs Banks Capital. Lisser & Rosenkranz, Tillmann and Altmann, Jewish owned Banks from Hamburg, opted to participate in Rhodius Koenigs capital expansion.

The Capital restrictions was the underlying reason why the Jewish Banks participation was not in shares but a loan of liquid assets. The loan thus served two purposes, it allowed the German Jewish investors to circumvent the restrictions on financial investments outside Germany and it provided Rhodius Koenigs with liquidity. To ensure the liquid assets provided by the Jewish Banks, Franz Koenigs used his collection as security.

In 1937, Franz and Anna Koenigs, lost their eldest son, Ernst Magnus Koenigs(31-5-1916 Berlin, 1937 in Spain) in the Spanish Civil War fighting Franco. While studying in England, Ernst was recruited by the P.O.U.M. Militia. He was only 20 years of age and in order to register he needed to falsify his identity. He took on the name Erwin Krause. It has been acknowledged though without any concrete proof, that Ernst was shot while flying over Barcelona.

Actively fighting Franco was the same as fighting the Nazi-regime and considered high treason. Therefore, Ernst's death had to remain a secret. Franz Koenigs, in reaction to his son's loss, trying to save what was left of his family, applied for Dutch citizenship. Two years later on 9 February 1939, Dutch citizenship was granted. At that time, with the staggering number of Jews fleeing Poland, Austria, Czechoslovakia, Sudetenland, Bohemia, Moravia and Germany it was hard to obtain Dutch citizenship For Franz Koenigs and his family to obtain the much desired Dutch passports, his loan of the Collection F. Koenigs to Museum Boijmans was brought forward as an important contribution to Dutch Cultural Society. Franz Koenigs by obtaining Dutch citizenship thus took a next step in saving his family and his art-collections from the Nazi-regime, in particularly from Hitler who at that time was the world's foremost art buyer.

In 1941, Franz Koenigs fell from a train platform at Cologne station in front of a train and died. At present descendants believe that the Nazis murdered him by throwing him under a train.

He collected an impressive number of Old Master Drawings, and Paintings since 1935 on loan at the Boijmans Museum. The collection was known as the F. Koenigs collection. Especially the quality of his Old Masters, caused high ranking on Hitlers desiderata list. On 2 April 1940, the Jewish owned bank Lisser & Rosenkranz liquidated in order to be insolvent before the Nazi invasion. Due to the thread of an acute invasion the Jewish owned bank sold the collection for a fraction of its worth to one of the patrons of the museum Boijmans.

On 3 December 1940, Van Beuningen concluded the sale of a fifth of the drawing collection, to be precise Van Beuningen sold 528 Franz Koenigs drawings for 1.5 Mio to Hitler through Hans Posse who acted for the collection for the Führermuseum in Linz. During the war, the Allies agreed on the Joint Declaration that all transactions between the occupied countries and the German occupier would be invalid, and that all art should be returned to the country of origin and hence to the original owner.

Soviet troops looted the art collection after the war and transported it to the Soviet Union. The Soviet authorities denied for a long time that they had the art collection. However, in the nineties, it became clear that Soviet troops had looted the art collection. The major part of the collection was exhibited in the Pushkin Museum in Moscow and a minor part in Kyiv. Honoring the request of the Dutch government, the Ukrainian authorities returned the part of the collection that was in Kyiv. More than 300 drawings from the same collection were traced to Moscow 10 years ago, but Russia has so far refused to hand them back.
