= Felix Koenigs =

German banker and art collector (1846–1900)

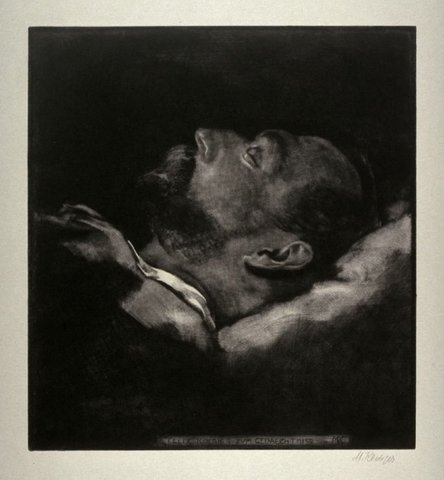
- 1900 Mezzotint of Koenigs on his deathbed, by Max Klinger
- Born: 18 May 1846; Cologne, Germany
- Died: 24 September 1900 (aged 54); Paris, France
- Burial place: Melaten cemetery, Cologne, Germany
- Occupations: Banker, art collector

Felix Koenigs (18 May 1846 – 24 September 1900) was a German banker and art collector.

== Early life ==
Koenigs was born on 18 May 1846 in Cologne to Franz Wilhelm Koenigs (1819–1882), was a merchant and textile manufacturer. His older brother, Ernst Friedrich Wilhelm Koenigs, and his younger brother was chemist Wilhelm Koenigs. His nephew, Franz Koenigs, was also a banker and art collector.

== Career ==
In 1866, he joined the banking firm of Delbrück, Leo & Co., founded by Adelbert Delbrück, and became a full partner in 1878.

In the 1890s, he was one of the founders and financiers of the Grunewald "villa colony" in Berlin, and owned several properties there. The Koenigsallee and the Koenigssee there are named after him.

Several famous artists were his close friends, including Adolf Brütt, Max Klinger, Wilhelm Leibl and Hans Olde. The sculptor, Otto Lessing, was a neighbor of his, and they once travelled together to Venice, on an art buying expedition.

He went to visit the Exposition Universelle with Brütt and Klinger, but suddenly became ill and died there. Brütt helped convey his estate to the National Gallery. The sculptures by Auguste Rodin, and the paintings by Christian Landenberger and Giovanni Segantini, are in the "Foundation of Modernism" collection at the Gallery.

His family grave, designed by Ludwig Brunow, is in the Melaten cemetery in Cologne.
