= Adolf Brütt =

German sculptor (1855–1939)

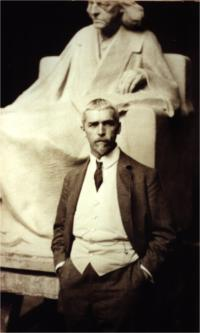
Adolf Brütt in Weimar, with his statue of Theodor Mommsen (1909)

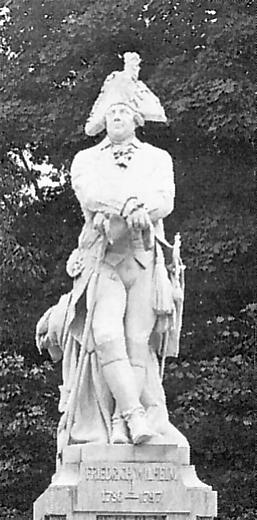
Statue of Friedrich Wilhelm II on the Siegesallee (c. 1901). It was heavily damaged in World War II

Adolf Brütt (10 May 1855 in Husum – 6 November 1939 in Bad Berka) was a German sculptor. He was the founder of the Weimarer Bildhauerschule (Weimar Sculpture School) and its accompanying bronze foundry.

== Biography ==
Brütt originally trained in Kiel as a stonemason and worked on several projects, including Schloss Linderhof. A stipend from the Sparkasse Kiel (a saving and loan institution) enabled him to study at the Prussian Academy of Art, where he graduated in 1878. He became a master student of the sculptor Leopold Rau (1847–1880), and worked in the Munich studios of Karl Begas, brother of the Neo-Baroque sculptor Reinhold Begas.

In 1883 he married and opened his own studio. He became a member of the Munich Secession in 1893. His sculpture Sword Dancer won a gold medal at the Exposition Universelle (1900) and secured his international reputation. He later became a Professor at the Prussian Academy and taught at the Fehr Academy, a private school in Berlin devoted to the ideals of the Secession founded by Conrad Fehr in 1892. Together with his friend, the banker Felix Koenigs, he helped to promote the Secession through exhibits at the National Gallery, which included works by Auguste Rodin and the French impressionists.

In 1905, he was appointed a Professor at the Weimar Saxon-Grand Ducal Art School, where he created the school for sculpture and bronze casting. Together with his students, he created the marble reliefs in the lobby of the new Court Theater in Weimar.

In 1910, he returned to Berlin and was succeeded at Weimar by Gottlieb Elster. His statue of the "Sword Dancer" was moved from Kiel to Berlin for the 1916 Summer Olympics. In 1928, he became an Honorary Citizen of Bad Berka. In 1996, his sculpture school became part of a UNESCO World Heritage Site.

== Selected works ==
- 1887: Der Fischer (The Fisherman), bronze, 176 cm, Berlin-Mitte, in front of the Alte Nationalgalerie. It was displayed at two world's fairs: Chicago (1893) and St.Louis (1904).
- 1896: Schwerttänzerin (Sword Dancer), bronze, 206 cm, Kiel, Rathausrotunde
- 1896: Reiterstandbild Kaiser Wilhelm I (equestrian statue), bronze, ca 300 cm, Kiel, Schlossgarten
- 1898: Standbild Bismarck, bronze, ca 300 cm, Hamburg-Altona, greensward on the Königstraße
- 1900: Group of figures, Siegesallee 29 (Victory Avenue); statue of Friedrich Wilhelm II of Prussia; busts of Großkanzler Johann Heinrich von Carmer and Immanuel Kant, marble. Now at the Spandau Citadel
- 1902: Asmussen-Woldsen-Brunnen (fountain), also called the Tine-Brunnen, granite, ca 200 cm high, Husum, Marktplatz
- 1903: Group of figures, Siegesallee 33; statue of Friedrich III, German Emperor; busts of Generalfeldmarschall Blumenthal and Hermann von Helmholtz, marble. Now at the Spandau Citadel
- 1907: Nacht (Night), ca 200 cm, a controversial, openly erotic marble statue. Kunstschule Weimar
- 1909: Sitzbild Theodor Mommsen (seated statue), marble, ca 250 cm, Berlin-Mitte, Court of Honor of Humboldt University
- 1912: Schwertmann (Swordsman), bronze, ca 300 cm, Kiel, Rathausmarkt
