= Prométhée (Fauré) =

Opera composed by Gabriel Fauré

Premiere of Prométhée

Prométhée, Op. 82, (Prometheus) is a tragédie lyrique (grand cantata) in three acts by the French composer Gabriel Fauré with a French libretto by the Symboliste poets Jean Lorrain and André-Ferdinand Hérold (1865–1940). It was partly based on the opening of the Greek tragedy of Prometheus Bound. The first performance at Arènes de Béziers on 27 August 1900 involved almost 800 performers (including two wind bands and 15 harps) and was watched by an audience of 10,000. Between 1914 and 1916, Jean Roger-Ducasse reworked the score for a reduced orchestra. This version (which was later revised by Fauré) made its debut at the Paris Opéra on 17 May 1917 but never became popular.

Designated as a tragédie lyrique, the work resists easy categorisation. It was intended to be on a large-scale with spoken and musical sections. Warrack and West call it a grand cantata, arguing that since "only some of the characters participate in the stage action it is scarcely an opera, though Fauré's conception of the work is at times more operatic than merely choral ... [and] the clearest example to date of Wagner's influence on his music."

== Roles ==
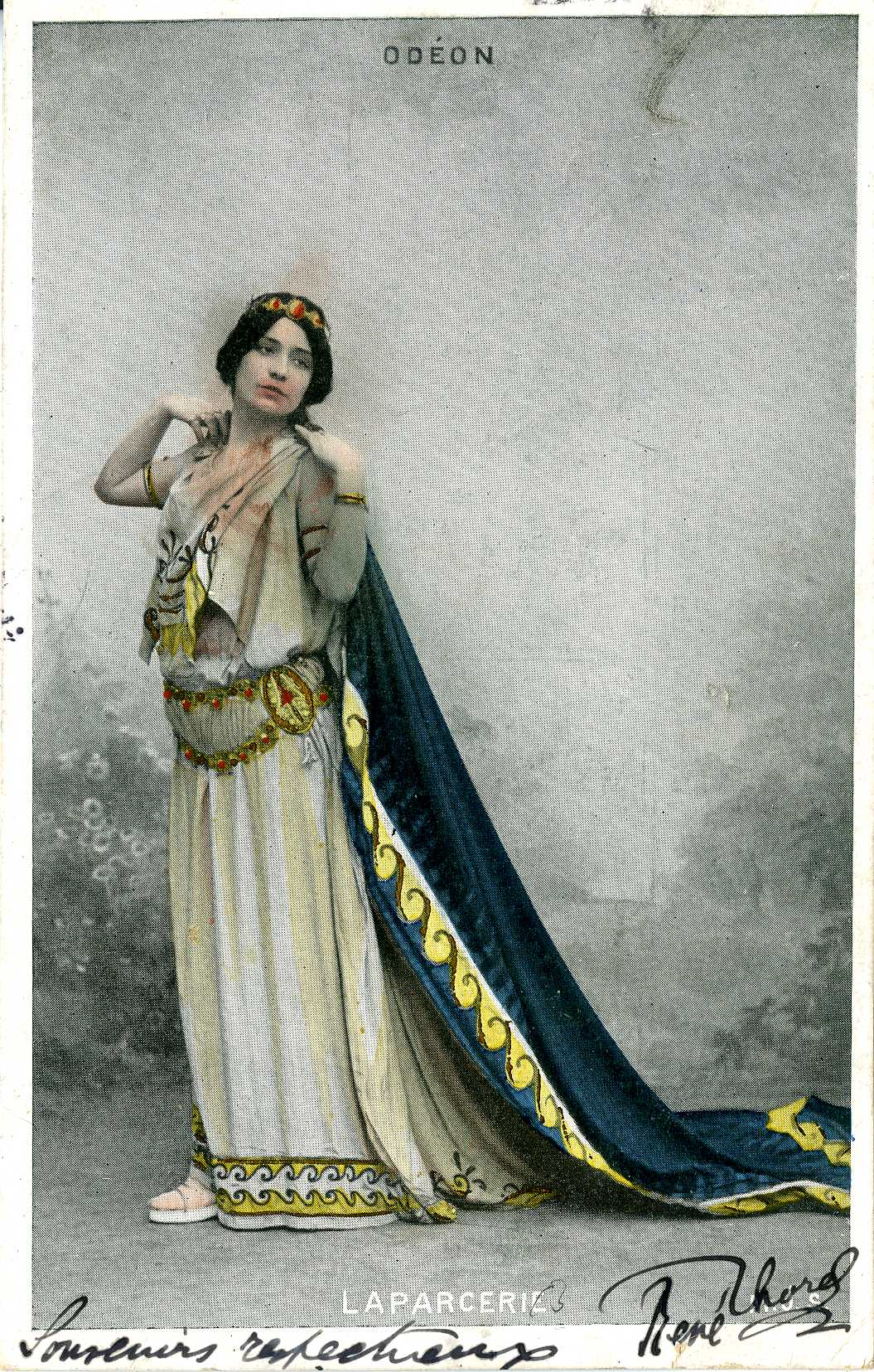
Cora Laparcerie as Pandore

Roles, voice types, premiere cast
Role	Voice type	Premiere cast, 27 August 1900 Conductor: Charles Eustace
Prométhée (Prometheus)	spoken role	Édouard de Max
Pandore (Pandora)	spoken role	Cora Laparcerie
Hermès (Hermes)	spoken role	Odette de Fehl
Aenoë	soprano	Torrês
Bia	soprano	Caroline Fiérens-Peters
Gaïa	mezzo-soprano	Rosa Feldy
Andros	tenor	Charles Rousselière
Kratos	tenor	Fonteix
Hephaïstos (Hephaestus)	bass	Jean Vallier

== Plot ==
The plot on which the opera was based has been deprecated as "patchy, and for the most part mediocre". It suffers particularly from the introduction of Pandore as the counterpart in importance of Prométhée. At the close of act 1 "she falls as if dead" and act 2 accordingly opens with the powerful funeral procession carrying her body. Illogically, but necessarily because of her balancing role, she revives later in the act and continues to take part in the action.

Act 1
A musical prelude is followed by a massed choral scene, in which Andros leads the men and Aenoë leads the women in rejoicing at the gift of fire. Prométhée praises its benefits but Pandore opposes his action in defying Zeus. Then Gaia appears to warn the Titan of the consequences of his action. She is followed by Kratos (power) and Bia (violence), sent by Zeus to punish him; with them is the divine smith Hephaestus, who is a friend of Prométhée. The three tell Prométhée his sentence: he will be chained forever to a rock and every day a black eagle shall drink from his veins.

Act 2
The female choir enters carrying Pandore on a bier of leafy branches, after which Aenoë makes the funeral oration. Prométhée returns with the executioners from Olympus. Though Hephaestus laments for his friend, Bia and Kratos are there to ensure that he make the chains to bind Prométhée to the rock. Having slit his veins, they leave and the revived Pandore enters again to lament his fate.

Act 3
A chorus of Oceanids comforts Pandore. Bia and Kratos return to threaten her and Prométhée, followed by Hermes with the gift of a box from Zeus. Despite being warned by Prométhée to refuse, Pandore insists on taking it. She discovers that her tears have been miraculously transformed there to a balsam. The opera ends with praise for the benevolence of the tyrannical Zeus.

== Productions ==
The opera has been presented very rarely, but in July 2011 there was a Brazilian production by the Núcleo Universitário de Ópera in São Paulo. This Brazilian production included recitatives instead of spoken lines and a new orchestration by their conductor and director, Paulo Maron.
