= Theia (Oceanid) =

Nymph in Greek mythology

In Greek mythology, Theia (/ˈθiːə/; Ancient Greek: Θεία, romanized: Theía, lit. 'divine', also rendered Thea or Thia) also called Memnonis is one of the three thousand Oceanid nymphs, daughters of the Titans Oceanus and Tethys, and the mother of the Cercopes. She is not to be confused with Theia, sister to Oceanus and Tethys and mother of Helios, Selene and Eos.

== Mythology ==
The Oceanid nymph Theia became the mother of the Cercopes, two mischievous impish thieves, by her own father Oceanus. Their mother advised them not to provoke the brave Heracles, but when her sons stole from the hero, he seized and bound them and was about to kill them; Theia begged him to let her sons go. They were then transformed into either monkeys or stone (in some versions for trying to deceive Zeus).

== See also ==
- List of Oceanids
- Niobe
- Leto
