= Zelus =

Ancient Greek daimon, the personification of zeal

- Personification of zeal, dedication, emulation, envy, rivalry, and jealousy
- Abode: Mount Olympus

Genealogy
- Parents: Pallas and Styx
- Siblings: Nike, Kratos, Bia

In Greek mythology, Zelus or Zelos (/ˈziːləs/; Ancient Greek: Ζῆλος, romanized: Zêlos, lit. 'zeal') was the daimon that personifies dedication, emulation, eager rivalry, envy, jealousy, and zeal. The English word "zeal" is derived from his name.

== Family ==
Zelus was the son of Pallas (the Titan) and Styx (an Oceanid). His siblings were Nike (Victory), Kratos (Strength), and Bia (Force).

== Mythology ==
=== Titanomachy ===
Zelus together with his siblings were winged enforcers who stood in attendance at Zeus' throne and formed part of his retinue.

==== Theogony ====
And Styx the daughter of Okeanos (Oceanus) was joined to Pallas and bare Zelos (Zelus, Emulation) and trim-ankled Nike (Victory) in the house. Also she brought forth Kratos (Kratos, Strength) and Bia (Force), wonderful children. These have no house apart from Zeus, nor any dwelling nor path except that wherein God leads them, but they dwell always with Zeus the loud-thunderer. For so did Styx the deathless daughter of Okeanos plan on that day when the Olympian Lightener called all the deathless gods to great Olympus (Olympus), and said that whosoever of the gods would fight with him against the Titanes, he would not cast him out from his rights, but each should have the office which he had before amongst the deathless gods. And he declared that he who was without office and rights as is just. So deathless Styx came first to Olympus with her children through the wit of her dear father. And Zeus honored her, and gave her very great gifts, for her he appointed to be the great oath of the gods, and her children to live with him always. And as he promised, so he performed fully unto them all.

==== Bibliotheca ====
Nike, Kratos (Cratus), Zelos (Zelus), and Bia were born to Pallas and Styx. Zeus instituted an oath to be sworn by the waters of Styx that flowed from a rock in Hades' realm, an honor granted in return for the help she and her children gave him against the Titanes (Titans).

=== Other appearances ===
Zelus’ Roman name was Invidia, which, in Latin, meant "to look against in a hostile manner". Because of its relation to Zelus, his Roman form was sometimes associated with the seven deadly sins.

==== Works and Days ====
Among the men of the fifth age . . . There will be no favour for the man who keeps his oath or for the just (dikaios) or for the good (agathos); but rather men will praise the evil-doer (kakos) and his violent dealing (hybris). Strength will be right (dike) and reverence (aidos) will cease to be; and the wicked will hurt the worthy man, speaking false words against him, and will swear an oath upon them. Envy (zelos), foul-mouthed, delighting in evil, with scowling face, will go along with wretched men one and all. And then Aidos (Aedos, Shame) and Nemesis (Indignation), with their sweet forms wrapped in white robes, will go from the wide-pathed earth and forsake mankind to join the company of the deathless gods: and bitter sorrows (lugra algea) will be left for mortal men, and there will be no help against evil.

==== Cynegetica ====
O father Zeus, how fierce a heart hath Zelos (Zelus, Rivalry)! Him hast thou made, O lord, mightier than nature to behold and has given him the bitter force of fire, and in his right hand hast vouchsafed to him to wear a sword of adamant. He preserves not, when he comes, dear children to their loving parents, he knows nor comrade nor kin nor cousin, when he intervenes grievous and unspeakable. He also in former times arrayed against their own children heroes themselves and hobble heroines.

Zelos may have also been identified with Agon, the personification of competition, and was closely connected with Eris. He was sometimes associated with Phthonus, the daimon of jealousy.

==== Christianity ====
It is considered that later the Catholic Church adapted him to its doctrine (considering only its aspect related to religious fervor), providing Zelo with wings and replacing the lamp and the whip with a gospel and a flaming sword.

According to the interpretatio graeca, he is also associated with the rider of the white horse, which represents conquest or glory.

== Genealogical tree ==
Zelus's genealogy

Uranus | Gaia
Oceanus | Tethys
River gods | Oceanids | Styx | Pallas
ZELUS | Nike | Kratos | Bia
