= Pallas (Titan) =

Titan in Greek mythology

Genealogy
- Parents: Crius and Eurybia
- Siblings: Astraeus and Perses
- Consort: Styx
- Children: Nike, Kratos, Bia, Zelus

In Greek mythology, Pallas or Pallantes (/ˈpæləs/; Ancient Greek: Πάλλας) was the son of the Titans Crius and Eurybia, the brother of Astraeus and Perses, the husband of Styx, and the father of Zelus, Nike, Kratos, and Bia. Hyginus says that Pallas, whom he calls "the giant", also fathered with Styx: Scylla, Fontus ("Fountains") and Lacus ("Lakes"). Pallas was sometimes regarded as the Titan god of warcraft and of the springtime campaign season.

== Family ==
The Homeric Hymn "To Hermes" makes the moon goddess Selene (usually the daughter of the Titans Hyperion and Theia), the daughter of a Pallas, son of (an otherwise unknown) Megamedes, which is possibly the same as this Pallas. Ovid uses the patronymic "Pallantias" or "Pallantis" as another name for Aurora, the Roman equivalent of the Greek Eos ("Dawn"), who was the sister of Selene; Ovid apparently regarding Aurora (or Eos) as the daughter of (or otherwise related to) Pallas.

The Suda in discussing Athena's epithet "Pallas" suggests a possible derivation "from brandishing (pallein) the spear". The geographer Pausanias reports that Pellene, a city in Achaea, was claimed by its inhabitants to be named after Pallas, while the Argives claimed it was named for the Argive Pellen.

== Family tree ==
Family of Eurybia and Crius

Pontus	Gaia	Uranus
Eurybia	Crius
Astraeus	Eos	Perses	Asteria	Pallas	Styx
Boreas	Astraea	Hecate	Zelus	Kratos
Notus	Eosphorus	Nike	Bia
Zephyrus	Stars

== See also ==
- Ares
- Enyo
- Eris
