= Kratos (mythology) =

Personification of strength in Greek mythology

- Personification of strength
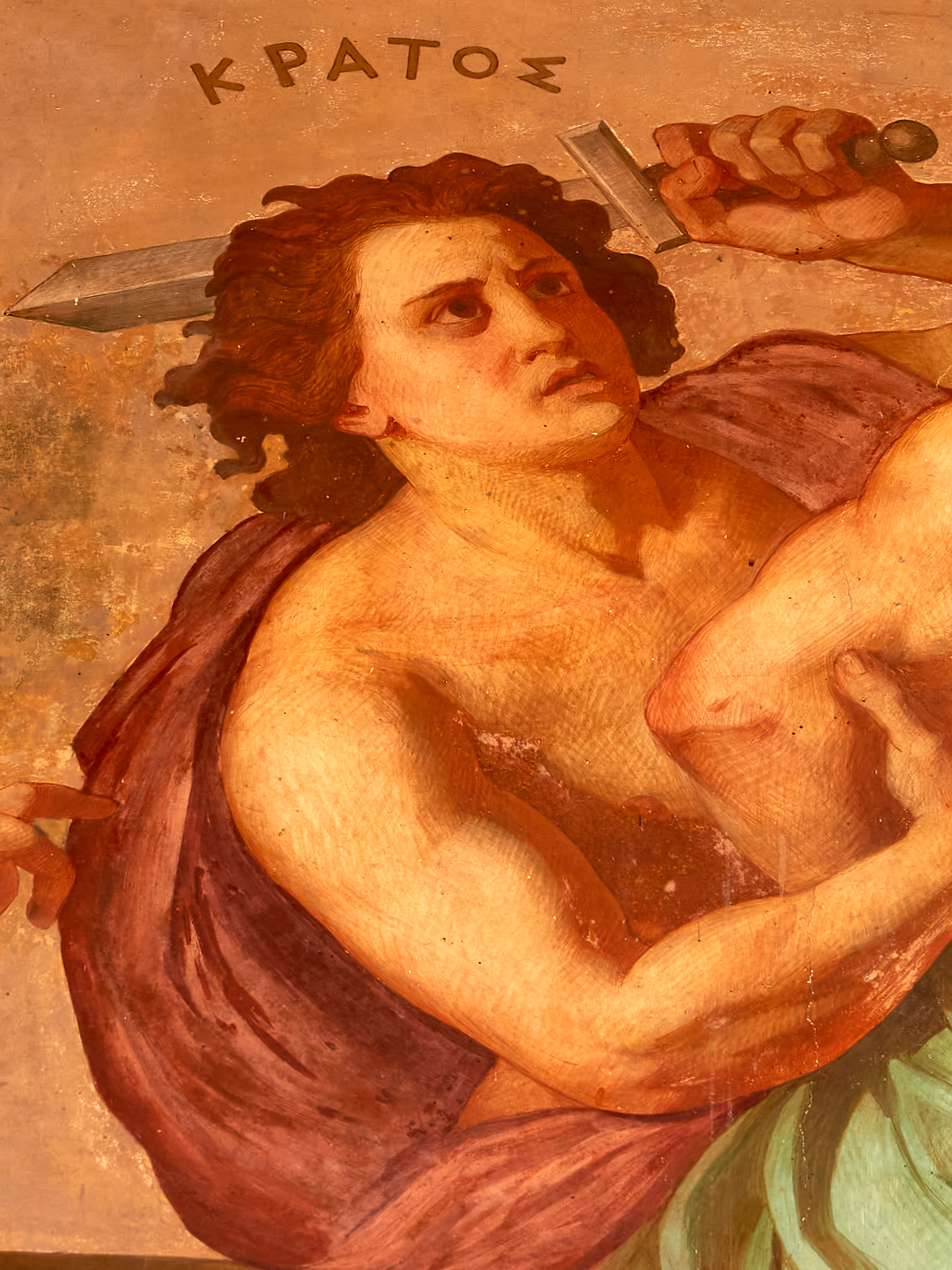
- Mural of Kratos at the National and Kapodistrian University of Athens, Greece
- Abode: Mount Olympus

Genealogy
- Parents: Pallas (father); Styx (mother)
- Siblings: Nike, Bia, and Zelus

In Greek mythology, Kratos (Ancient Greek: Κράτος, lit. 'power, strength') also known as Cratus or Cratos, is the divine personification of strength. He is the son of Pallas and Styx. Kratos and his siblings Nike (Victory), Bia (Force), and Zelus (Glory) are all the personification of a specific trait. Kratos is first mentioned alongside his siblings in Hesiod's Theogony. According to Hesiod, Kratos and his siblings dwell with Zeus because their mother Styx came to him first to request a position in his regime, so he honored her and her children with exalted positions. Kratos and his sister Bia are best known for their appearance in the opening scene of Aeschylus' Prometheus Bound. Acting as agents of Zeus, they lead the captive Titan Prometheus on stage. Kratos compels the mild-mannered blacksmith god Hephaestus to chain Prometheus to a rock as punishment for his theft of fire.

Kratos is characterized as brutal and merciless, repeatedly mocking both Hephaestus and Prometheus' advocacy against the use of unnecessary violence. He defends Zeus' oppressive rule and predicts that Prometheus will never escape his bonds. In Aeschylus' Libation Bearers, Electra calls upon Kratos, Dike ("Justice"), and Zeus to aid her brother Orestes in avenging the murder of their father Agamemnon. Kratos and Bia appear in a late fifth-century BC red-figure Attic skyphos of the punishment of Ixion, possibly based on a scene from a lost tragedy by Euripides. They also appear in late eighteenth and nineteenth-century Romantic depictions and adaptations of the binding of Prometheus.

== Ancient Greek literature and art ==
=== Theogony ===
Kratos and his siblings are first mentioned in the Theogony, which was composed by the Boeotian poet Hesiod in the late eighth or early seventh century BC. Hesiod states: "And Styx the daughter of Ocean was joined to Pallas and bore Zelus (Emulation) and trim-ankled Nike (Victory) in the house. Also she brought forth Cratos (Strength) and Bia (Force), wonderful children. These have no house apart from Zeus, nor any dwelling nor path except that wherein God leads them, but they dwell always with Zeus the loud-thunderer." Here Kratos is merely listed as a deified abstraction with little development or explanation. Hesiod goes on to explain that the reason why the children of Styx were allowed to dwell with Zeus was because Zeus had decreed after the Titanomachy that all those who had not held offices under Kronos would be given positions in his regime. Because Styx came to Zeus first, along with her children, Zeus honored them as among the highest members of his new regime. According to Diana Burton, Styx, Zelus, Nike, Kratos, and Bia's voluntary change in allegiance represents the certainty of Zeus' victory over the Titans. While the goddesses Dike ('Justice'), Eunomia ('Good Law'), and Eirene ('Peace') represent the benefits of Zeus' reign, Kratos and his siblings represent the work needed to build that regime.

=== Prometheus Bound ===
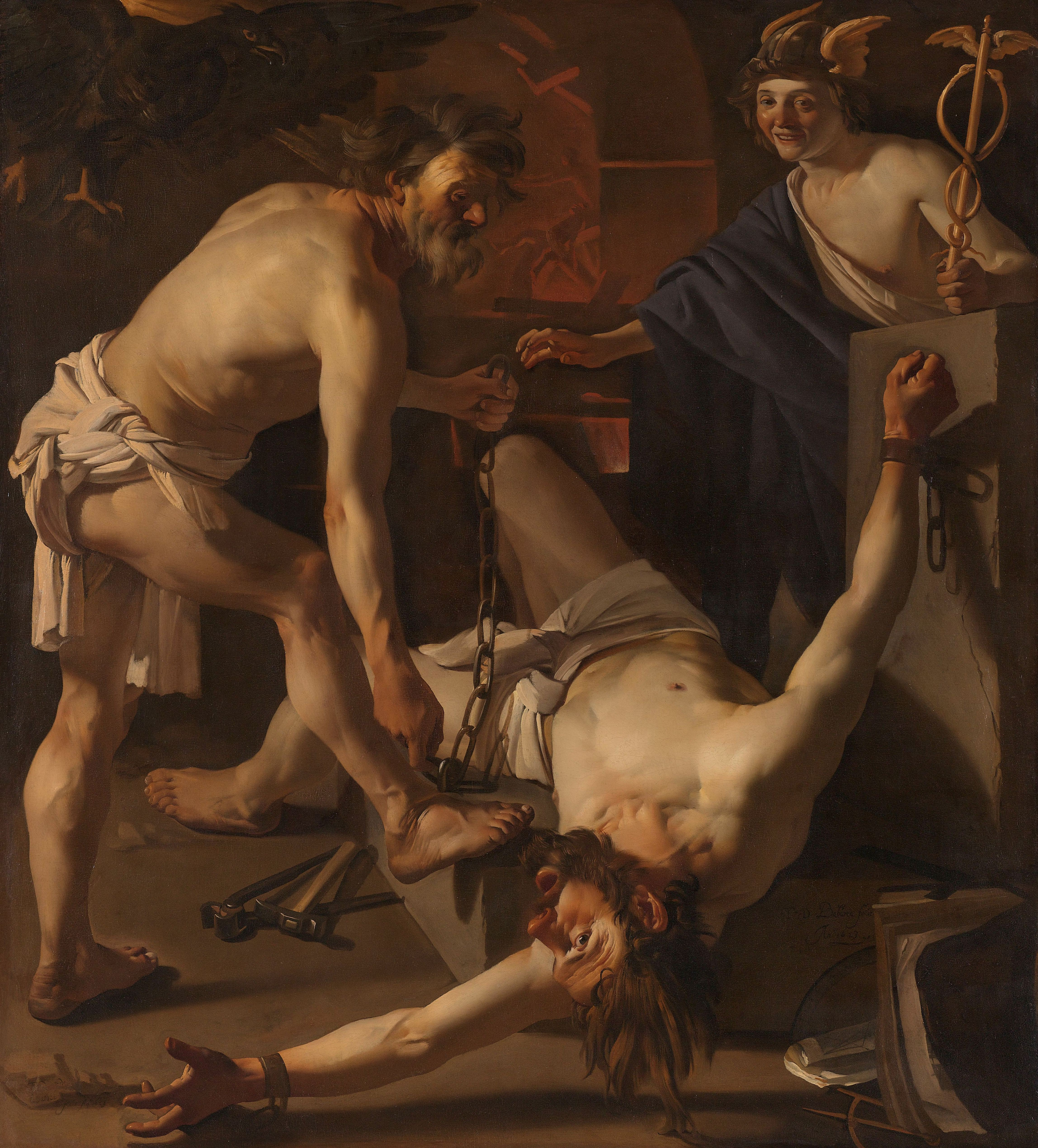
Prometheus Being Chained by Vulcan (1623) by Dirck van Baburen. In Aeschylus' Prometheus Bound, Kratos (not shown in this painting) is the one who orders Hephaestus to chain Prometheus.

In the opening scene of the tragedy Prometheus Bound, which is traditionally attributed to Aeschylus, Kratos and his sister Bia are taking Prometheus to a remote location in the Scythian wilderness, where he will be chained to a rocky outcropping. The order to do this was given by Zeus himself and Kratos and Bia are portrayed as the embodiment of Zeus' new regime. The presence of Kratos and Bia but absence of Nike and Zelus indicates the play's tyrannical portrayal of Zeus, since Kratos and Bia represent the more tyrannical aspects of authority. Kratos in particular represents what Ian Ruffell calls "the kind of uncomplicated thug for whom despotic regimes offer countless job opportunities." He enforces the power of Zeus through physical brutality and pitilessness. Bia, though present in the scene, does not have any lines; only Kratos speaks.

Kratos coerces the mild-mannered blacksmith god Hephaestus into chaining Prometheus to the rocky crag, despite Hephaestus' objections to this. Hephaestus laments over Prometheus' future suffering, leading Kratos to ridicule him. Kratos equates the rule of law with rule by fear and condemns pity as a pointless waste of time. Hephaestus and Kratos agree that Zeus is "oppressive" (barús, lit. 'heavy'). Kratos regards justice (δίκη díkē) as a system of cosmic hierarchy in which the monarch, Zeus, decides who receives which privileges and who does not. Anyone who breaches this social divide is a transgressor who must be punished. Kratos states that, under the rule of a monarch such as Zeus, no one but Zeus himself is truly free. Hephaestus agrees with this assessment.

Kratos repeatedly orders Hephaestus to use more violence than necessary to inflict as much pain as possible against Prometheus. First he orders Hephaestus to nail Prometheus' hands to the rock. Then he orders him to drive a steel wedge through his chest. Finally, he orders him to tie Prometheus' legs to immobilize him. Hephaestus criticizes Kratos, telling him that his speech is as ugly as his physical appearance. Kratos responds by telling him, "Be soft. Do not throw in my face my 'willfulness' and 'roughness of temper'." Once Prometheus has been bound, Hephaestus, Bia, and Kratos exit offstage, with Kratos being the last one to leave. Just before he departs, Kratos mocks Prometheus, saying that he will never escape from his shackles (which he later does, aided by Heracles) and that he does not deserve his name. (Promētheús means "forethought" in Greek.) According to Robert Holmes Beck, Aeschylus' depiction of the harsh punishment of Prometheus was intended as an example of how wrongdoers must be punished to deter others from transgressing. In this interpretation, Kratos' cruelty is not intended to be viewed as excessive, but rather as the proper enforcement of justice.

=== Other references ===
In Aeschylus' Libation Bearers, Electra invokes Kratos, Dike, and Zeus to support her and her brother Orestes' quest to avenge the murder of their father Agamemnon by their mother Clytemnestra. Plato's dialogue Protagoras, written in the fourth century BC, includes an account of the legend of Prometheus in which Prometheus stole fire from the temple of Athena and Hephaestus rather than the citadel of Zeus because the "guards of Zeus" (Διὸς φυλακαί, Diòs phylakaí) were too frightening. The identity of these "guards" is unknown and disputed.

Depictions of Kratos and Bia in ancient Greek art are extremely rare. The only known surviving depiction of Kratos and Bia in ancient Greek pottery is on a fragmentary red-figure skyphos by the Meidias Painter, or a member of his circle, that is dated to the end of the fifth century BC and depicts the punishment of Ixion. The vase is in the private collection of Herbert Cahn in Basel, Switzerland, and only a bit of hair belonging to Kratos is still visible on the remaining fragments. One of Bia's hands is visible on the wheel that Ixion is bound to, steadying it. H. A. Shapiro conjectures that this is probably a representation of a scene from the lost tragedy Ixion by Euripides, who likely borrowed the figures of Kratos and Bia from Prometheus Bound. Kratos is listed as one of the sons of Pallas and Styx in the Library of Pseudo-Apollodorus.

In the preface to his Fabulae, the Roman author Gaius Julius Hyginus describes Potestas (Power) as being among the offspring of Pallas and Styx.

== In modern culture ==
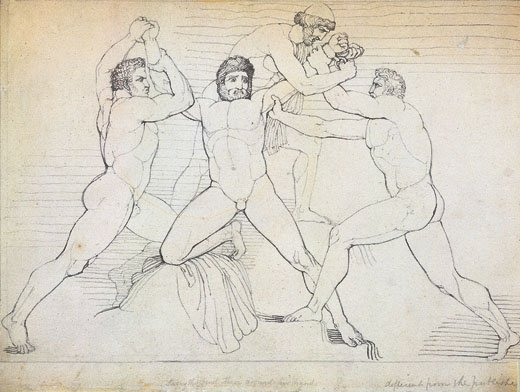
Illustration of the binding of Prometheus by John Flaxman, first published in Richard Porson's 1795 translation of Aeschylus' Prometheus Bound. Kratos and Bia stand on either side holding him down as Hephaestus chains him to the mountainside.

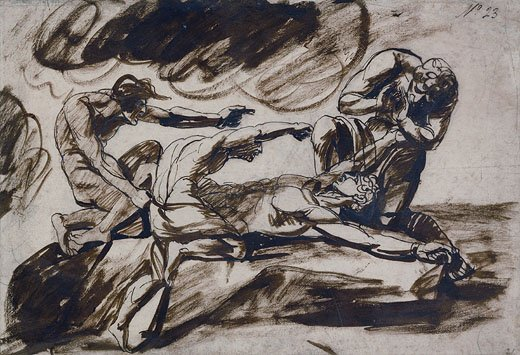
Black chalk drawing of the binding of Prometheus by George Romney, dating to c. 1798–1799. Kratos and Bia are at his feet, holding him down as Hephaestus binds his arms.

In 1772, Thomas Morell published his English translation of Prometheus Bound as Prometheus in Chains, making the work widely available to the British public for the first time. Four years later, the abolitionist Richard Potter published a complete English translation of all Aeschylus' tragedies. The scene from Prometheus Bound in which Hephaestus chains Prometheus to a mountainside with the aid of Kratos and Bia captured the imagination of the eighteenth and nineteenth-century Romantics and became a lens through which they analyzed questions of the relationships between revolution and tyranny, slavery and freedom, and war and peace.

Richard Porson's 1795 translation of Prometheus Bound was illustrated with drawings by John Flaxman showing the famous binding scene. Between 1798 and 1799, George Romney produced a series of chalk drawings of scenes from Prometheus Bound, including the binding scene with Kratos and Bia. In both Flaxman and Romney's illustrations, Kratos and Bia are shown together in symmetry. In 1819, Percy Bysshe Shelley adapted the myth of Prometheus for his own play Prometheus Unbound.

In Gabriel Fauré's three-act opera Prométhée, first performed in 1900 with a French libretto written by the poets Jean Lorrain and André-Ferdinand Hérold, the scene from the beginning of Prometheus Bound in which Kratos coerces Hephaestus into binding Prometheus is closely paraphrased. Hephaestus' dialogue with Kratos is set to music containing "impressionist allusions to the whole-tone scale". Fauré was known for his soft, genteel chamber music and the "hateful fury" of the music behind Kratos and Bia's dialogue stunned audiences.

A character named Kratos appears in the God of War video game franchise, the first seven games of which are based on Greek mythology. The character is portrayed as what classical scholar Sylwia Chmielewski calls "a deeply tragic, Herculean anti-hero who, after murdering his family, has to wash away the miasma to regain his peace of mind." The video game character Kratos was given his name at a late stage in the development of the original 2005 game, after the character had already been fleshed out. Unaware of the actual mythological god named Kratos appearing in Prometheus Bound, the creators coincidentally chose the name Kratos, the same Greek word meaning "Strength", of which the mythological figure Kratos is the personification. Stig Asmussen, the director of 2010's God of War III, called the naming coincidence a "happy mistake", noting that the Kratos in the game and the one in Prometheus Bound are both "pawns". Zoran Iovanovici of California State University, Long Beach observed with irony that, while the mythological Kratos is best known for chaining Prometheus, in 2007's God of War II, the video game character releases him. Chmielewski states that the video game character Kratos draws extensively on other figures from Greek mythology, including the heroes Perseus, Theseus, and Achilles, but his strongest influence is the hero Heracles. The Greek-based games portray Kratos as brutal and violent towards innocents. In God of War III, he kills the vast majority of the Greek gods, who are portrayed as "corrupted and vengeful", and restores the original state of primordial chaos to Greece.

== Notes ==
=== Bibliography ===
- Aeschylus (?), Prometheus Bound in Aeschylus, with an English translation by Herbert Weir Smyth, Ph. D. in two volumes. Vol 2. Cambridge, Massachusetts. Harvard University Press. 1926. Online version at the Perseus Digital Library.
- Allen, Danielle S. (2000), The World of Prometheus: The Politics of Punishing in Democratic Athens, Princeton, New Jersey: Princeton University Press, ISBN 978-0-691-05869-6
- Apollodorus, Apollodorus, The Library, with an English Translation by Sir James George Frazer, F.B.A., F.R.S. in 2 Volumes. Cambridge, Massachusetts, Harvard University Press; London, William Heinemann Ltd. 1921. Online version at the Perseus Digital Library.
- Beck, Robert Holmes (1975), Aeschylus: Playwright Educator, The Hague, The Netherlands: Martinus Nijhoff, doi:10.1007/978-94-011-8818-0, ISBN 978-94-011-8818-0
- Bertagnolli, Paul (2016) [2007], Prometheus in Music: Representations of the Myth in the Romantic Era, New York City, New York and London, England: Routledge, ISBN 978-07-546-5468-1
- Boegehold, Alan L. (1999), When a Gesture was Expected: A Selection of Examples from Archaic and Classical Greek Literature, Princeton, New Jersey: Princeton University Press, ISBN 978-0-691-00263-7
- Burton, Diana (2011), "Chapter Four: Nike, Dike and Zeus at Olympia", in McWilliam, Janette; Puttock, Sonia; Stevenson, Tom; Taraporewalla, Rashna (eds.), The Statue of Zeus at Olympia: New Approaches, Cambridge, England: Cambridge Scholars Publishing, ISBN 978-1-4438-2921-2
- Chmielewski, Sylwia (2016), "C://Hercules in Computer Games/A Heroic Evolution", in Dominas, Konrad; Wesołowska, Elżbieta; Trocha, Bogdan (eds.), Antiquity in Popular Literature and Culture, Cambridge, England: Cambridge Scholars Publishing, pp. 177–192, ISBN 978-1-4438-9024-3
- Gantz, Timothy, Early Greek Myth: A Guide to Literary and Artistic Sources, Johns Hopkins University Press, 1996, Two volumes: ISBN 978-0-8018-5360-9 (Vol. 1), ISBN 978-0-8018-5362-3 (Vol. 2).
- Hesiod, Theogony, in The Homeric Hymns and Homerica with an English Translation by Hugh G. Evelyn-White, Cambridge, Massachusetts., Harvard University Press; London, William Heinemann Ltd. 1914. Online version at the Perseus Digital Library.
- Hard, Robin (2004), The Routledge Handbook of Greek Mythology: Based on H.J. Rose's Handbook of Greek Mythology, New York City, New York and London, England: Routledge, ISBN 978-0-203-44633-1
- Huffman, Carl (2007), "Philolaus and the Central Fire", in Stern-Gilette, Suzanne; Corrigan, Kevin (eds.), Reading Ancient Texts: Presocratics and Plato: Essays in Honour of Denis O'Brien, Leiden, The Netherlands and Boston, Massachusetts: Brill, pp. 57–96, ISBN 978-90-04-16509-0
- Lowe, Dunstan (2009), "Playing with Antiquity: Videogame Receptions of the Classical World", in Lowe, Dunstan; Shahabudin, Kim (eds.), Classics For All: Reworking Antiquity in Mass Culture, Cambridge, England: Cambridge Scholars Publishing, pp. 64–90, ISBN 978-1-4438-0120-1
- Marshall, C. W. (2017), Aeschylus: Libation Bearers, Bloomsbury Companions to Greek and Roman Tragedy, New York City, New York and London, England: Bloomsbury Academic, ISBN 978-1-4742-5508-0
- Martin, Richard (2016), Classical Mythology: The Basics, New York City, New York and London, England: Routledge, ISBN 978-1-315-72718-9
- Pearson, Birger A. (1997), "Philanthropy in the Greco-Roman World and in Early Christianity", The Emergence of the Christian Religion: Essays on Early Christianity, Eugene, Oregon: Wipf & Stock, ISBN 978-1-62032-637-4
- Quinio, Charles; Weller, Peter; Iovanovici, Zoran; Lape, Susan; Purves, Alex; Madden, John; Asmussen, Stig (2010), God of War: Unearthing the Legend (Documentary), Los Angeles, California: Santa Monica Studio, event occurs at 00:35:33
- Ruffell, Ian (2012), Aeschylus: Prometheus Bound, Companions to Greek and Roman Tragedy, London, England: Bristol Classical Press, ISBN 978-0-7156-3476-9
- Sammons, Benjamin (2018), "Hesiod's Theogony and the Structures of Poetry", in Loney, Alexander C.; Scully, Stephen (eds.), The Oxford Handbook of Hesiod, Oxford, England: Oxford University Press, ISBN 978-0-19-090536-1
- Shapiro, H. A. (1994), Myth Into Art: Poet and Painter in Classical Greece, New York City, New York and London, England: Routledge, ISBN 978-0-203-41503-0
- Smith, Amy C. (2011), Polis and Personification in Classical Athenian Art, Monumenta Graeca et Romana, Leiden, The Netherlands: Koninklijke Brill, ISBN 978-90-04-19417-5, ISSN 0169-8850
- Spindler, Alexander J. (2015), "The Art of the Stage Machinist: A Dramatic Reconstruction of Aeschylus' Linear Tragedy, Prometheus Bound", Honors Bachelor of Arts, Paper 3, Cincinnati, Ohio
- Van Kooy, Dana (2016), Shelley's Radical Stages: Performance and Cultural Memory in the Post-Napoleonic Era, New York City, New York and London, England, ISBN 978-1-315-60894-5
