= Bia (mythology) =

Personification of violence in Greek mythology

- Personification of violence
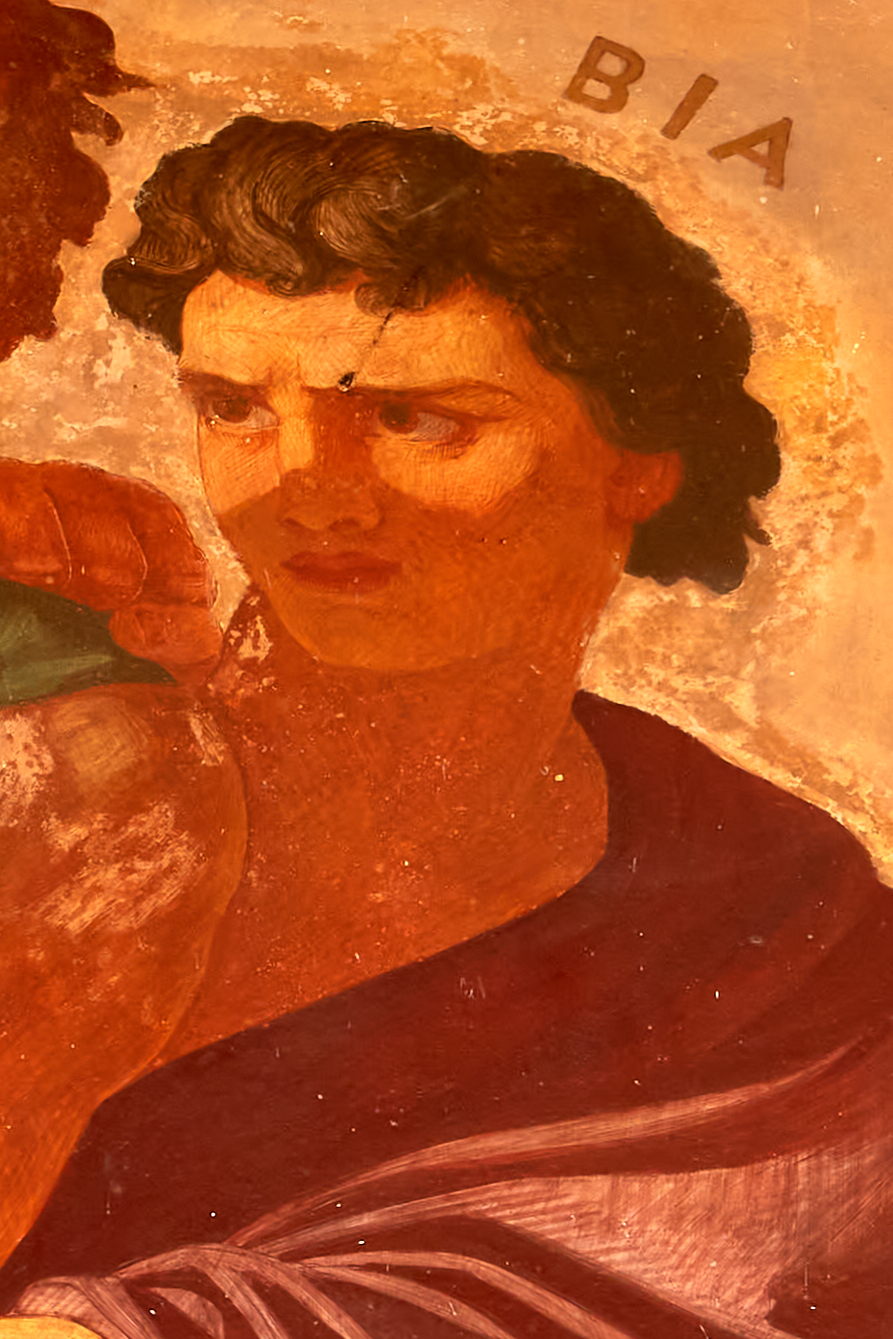
- Mural of Bia at the National and Kapodistrian University of Athens, Greece
- Abode: Mount Olympus

Genealogy
- Parents: Pallas and Styx
- Siblings: Nike, Kratos, and Zelus

In Greek mythology, Bia (/ˈbaɪə/; Ancient Greek: Βία [bí.aː], 'force, strength') is the personification of violence.

== Family ==
Bia was the daughter of the Titan Pallas and Oceanid Styx, and sister of Nike, Kratos, and Zelus.

== Mythology ==
Bia and her siblings were constant companions of Zeus. They achieved this honour after supporting him in the Titan War along with their mother. Bia is one of the characters named in the Greek tragedy Prometheus Bound, attributed to Aeschylus, where Hephaestus is compelled by the gods to bind Prometheus after he was caught stealing fire and offering the gift to mortals. Although she appears alongside her brother Kratos, she does not speak.

=== Titanomachy ===
Along with their mother, Bia and her siblings helped Zeus in his war against the Titans. The war, which was referred to as the Titanomachy, lasted for ten years, with the Olympian gods emerging victorious. Due to their heroic actions during the war, the four siblings won Zeus's respect and became his constant companions. They were almost always by his side as he sat on his throne in Mount Olympus, and they were tasked with enforcing Zeus's orders whenever he required an act of strength.

=== Prometheus' punishment ===
Bia is not as well known as her siblings Kratos or Nike, and when she appears in myths, she is usually silent. However, she does play a pivotal role in the story of Prometheus. Prometheus was one of the Titans and was often in conflict with Zeus. Eventually, he angered Zeus so much that he decided to punish him for all of eternity. He ordered that Prometheus be chained to a rock in the Caucasus Mountains. Bia and her brother, Kratos, were sent to ensure that Hephaestus carried out this task. Each day, an eagle would pluck out Prometheus's liver and eat it in front of him. Each night his liver would regrow, and the cycle would begin again, leaving him in perpetual torment.

== Worship ==
According to Pausanias, there was a sanctuary to Bia and Ananke near Acrocorinth.

== Family tree ==
Bia's genealogy

Uranus	Gaia
Oceanus	Tethys
River gods	Oceanids	Styx	Pallas
Zelus	Nike	Kratos	BIA
