= Titans =

Pre-Olympian gods in Greek mythology

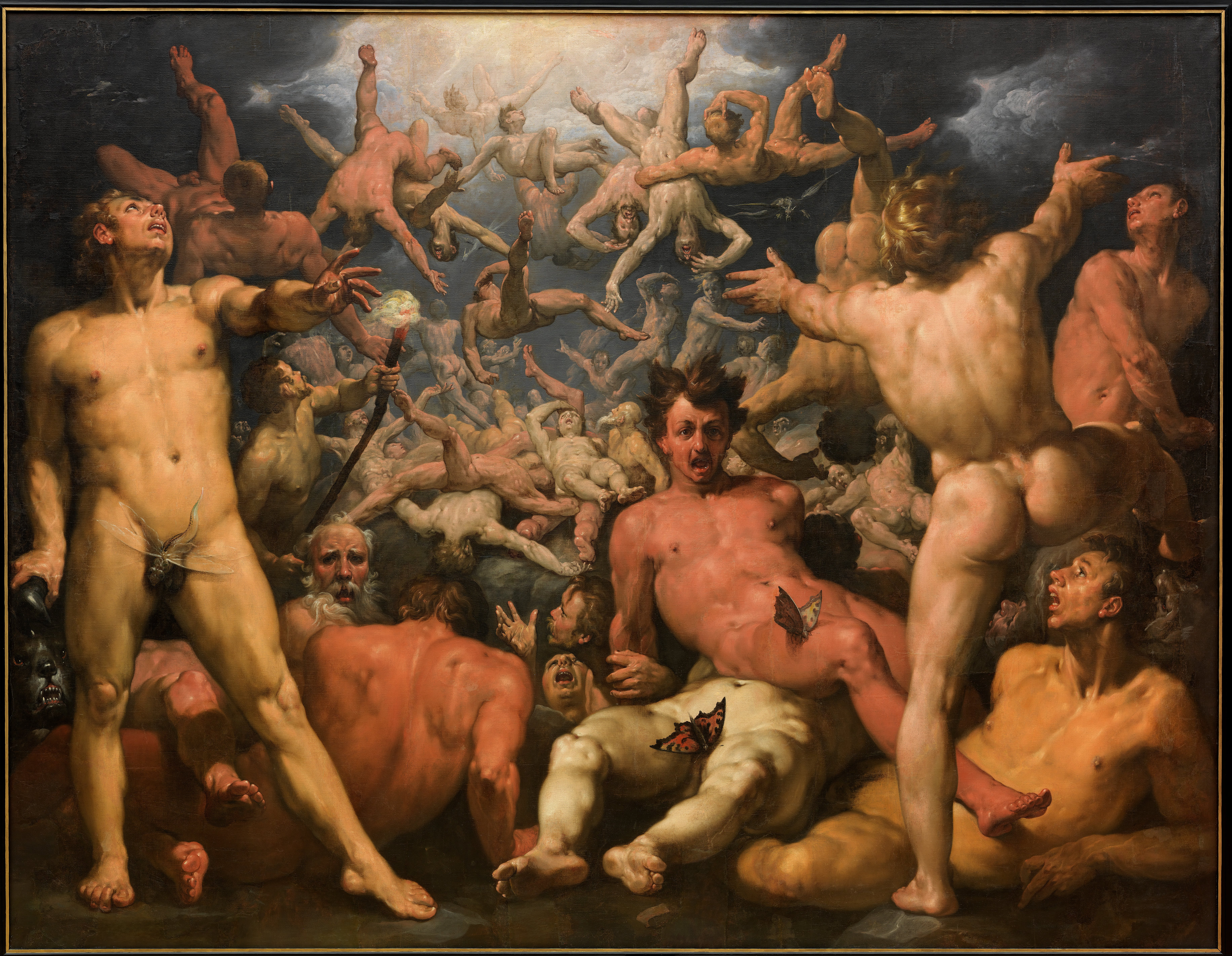
The Fall of the Titans (1596–98), a mythological painting by Dutch painter Cornelis van Haarlem.

In Greek mythology, the Titans (Ancient Greek: Τιτᾶνες, romanized: Tītânes; sing., Τιτάν, Tītā́n) were the deities who preceded the Olympians. According to the Theogony of Hesiod, they were the twelve children of the primordial deities Uranus (Sky) and Gaia (Earth). The six male Titans were Oceanus, Coeus, Crius, Hyperion, Iapetus, and Cronus, and the six female Titans (called the Titanesses; Τιτανίδες, Tītānídes; sing., Τιτανίς, Tītānís) were Theia, Rhea, Themis, Mnemosyne, Phoebe, and Tethys.

After Cronus married his sister Rhea, she bore the first generation of Olympians: the six siblings Zeus, Hera, Poseidon, Demeter, Hades, and Hestia. Certain other children of the Titans, including Prometheus, Atlas, Helios, and Leto, are sometimes also called Titans.

The Titans were the former deities, the generation of gods preceding the Olympians. They were overthrown as part of the Greek succession myth, which tells how Cronus seized power from his father Uranus and ruled the cosmos with his fellow Titans before in turn being defeated and replaced as the ruling pantheon of gods by Zeus and the Olympians in a ten-year war known as the Titanomachy ('Battle of the Titans'). In the aftermath of this war, the vanquished Titans were banished from the upper world and held imprisoned under guard in Tartarus. Some Titans, such as Oceanus and Helios, were allowed to remain free.

== Genealogy ==
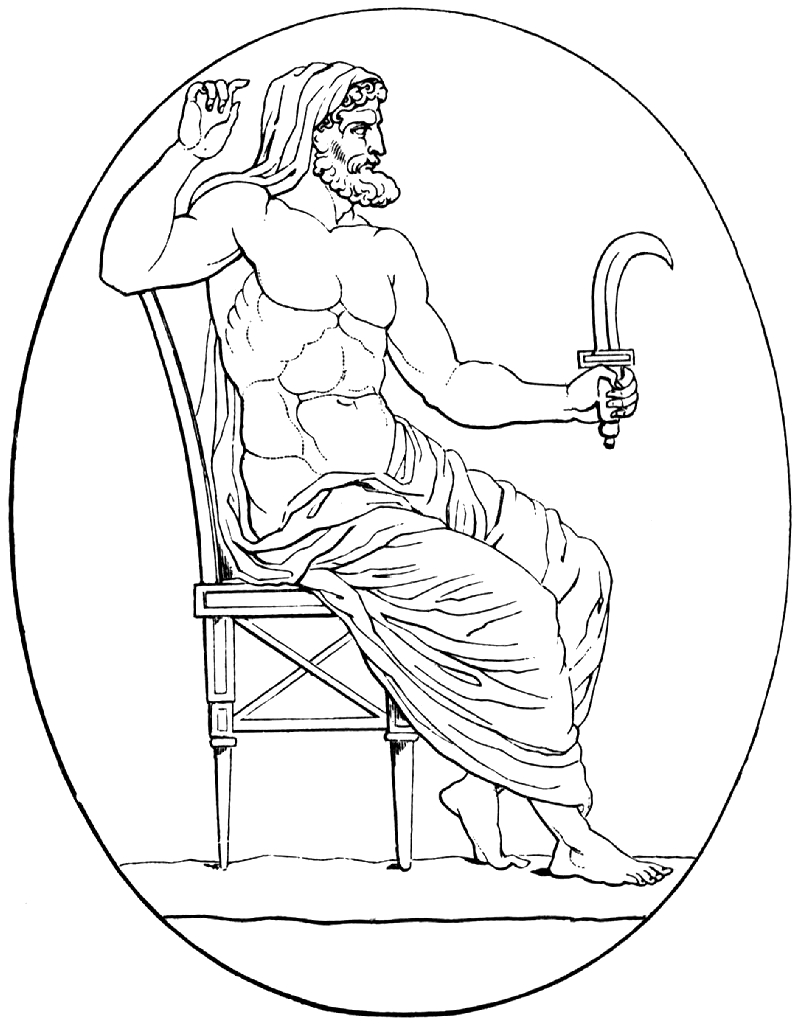
Cronus armed with sickle; image derived from a carved gem (Aubin-Louis Millin de Grandmaison, Galerie mythologique, 1811).

=== Hesiod's genealogy ===
According to Hesiod, the children of Uranus and Gaia were Oceanus, Coeus, Crius, Hyperion, Iapetus, Theia, Rhea, Themis, Mnemosyne, Phoebe, Tethys, and Cronus. Among eight of the twelve Titans there were four marriages between brothers and sisters: Oceanus and Tethys, Coeus and Phoebe, Hyperion and Theia, and Cronus and Rhea. The other two Titans, Iapetus and Crius, married with familiars who were not their sisters. Iapetus married his niece Clymene, the daughter of Oceanus and Tethys, while Crius married his half-sister Eurybia, the daughter of Gaia and Pontus. The other two Titanesses, Themis and Mnemosyne, married with their nephew Zeus, the son of Cronus and Rhea.

From Oceanus and Tethys came the three thousand river gods, and three thousand Oceanids. From Coeus and Phoebe came Leto, another wife of Zeus, and Asteria. From Crius and Eurybia came Astraeus, Pallas, and Perses. From Hyperion and Theia came the celestial personifications Helios (Sun), Selene (Moon), and Eos (Dawn). From Iapetus and Clymene came Atlas, Menoetius, Prometheus, and Epimetheus. From Cronus and Rhea came the Olympians: Hestia, Demeter, Hera, Hades, Poseidon, and Zeus. By Zeus, Themis bore the three Horae (Hours), and the three Moirai (Fates), and Mnemosyne bore the nine Muses.

While the descendants of the Titans Oceanus and Tethys, Cronus and Rhea, Themis, and Mnemosyne (i.e. the river gods, the Oceanids, the Olympians, the Horae, the Moirai, and the Muses) are not normally considered to be Titans, descendants of the other Titans, notably Leto, Helios, Atlas, and Prometheus, are themselves sometimes referred to as Titans.

The twelve Titans' parents, spouses, and children, according to Hesiod's Theogony

Uranus	Gaia	Pontus
Oceanus	Tethys	Coeus	Phoebe	Crius	Eurybia
The Rivers	The Oceanids	Leto	Asteria	Astraeus	Pallas	Perses
Hyperion	Theia	Iapetus	Clymene
Helios	Selene	Eos	Atlas	Menoetius	Prometheus	Epimetheus
Cronus	Rhea
Hestia	Demeter	Hera	Hades	Poseidon	Zeus
Themis	(Zeus)	Mnemosyne
The Horae	The Moirai	The Muses

=== Variations ===
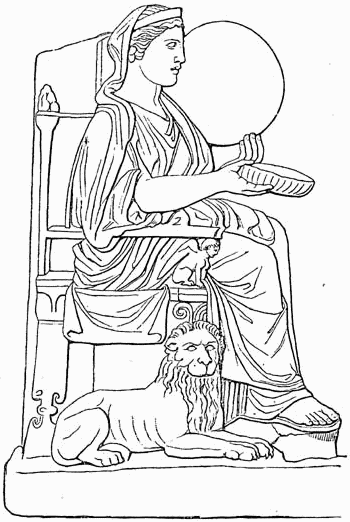
Rhea, sister and wife to Cronus.

Passages in a section of the Iliad called the Deception of Zeus suggest the possibility that Homer knew of a tradition in which Oceanus and Tethys (rather than Uranus and Gaia, as in Hesiod) were the parents of the Titans. Twice Homer has Hera describe the pair as "Oceanus, from whom the gods are sprung, and mother Tethys", while in the same passage Hypnos describes Oceanus as "from whom they all are sprung".

Plato, in his Timaeus, provides a genealogy (probably Orphic) which perhaps reflected an attempt to reconcile this apparent divergence between Homer and Hesiod, with Uranus and Gaia as the parents of Oceanus and Tethys, and Oceanus and Tethys as the parents of Cronus and Rhea "and all that go with them", plus Phorcys. In his Cratylus, Plato quotes Orpheus as saying that Oceanus and Tethys were "the first to marry", possibly also reflecting an Orphic theogony in which Oceanus and Tethys, rather than Uranus and Gaia, were the primeval parents. To Hesiod's twelve Titans, the mythographer Apollodorus, adds a thirteenth Titan, Dione, the mother of Aphrodite by Zeus. Plato's inclusion of Phorkys, apparently, as a Titan, and the mythographer Apollodorus's inclusion of Dione, suggests an Orphic tradition in which the canonical twelve Titans consisted of Hesiod's twelve with Phorkys and Dione taking the place of Oceanus and Tethys.

The Roman mythographer Hyginus, in his somewhat confused genealogy, after listing as offspring of Aether (Upper Sky) and Earth (Gaia), Ocean [Oceanus], Themis, Tartarus, and Pontus, next lists "the Titans", followed by two of Hesiod's Hundred-Handers: Briareus and Gyges, one of Hesiod's three Cyclopes: Steropes, then continues his list with Atlas, Hyperion and Polus, Saturn [Cronus], Ops [Rhea], Moneta, Dione, and the three Furies: Alecto, Megaera, and Tisiphone. The geographer Pausanias mentions seeing the image of a man in armor, who was supposed to be the Titan Anytos, who was said to have raised the Arcadian goddess Despoina and had partaken in the dismemberment of Dionysus (Zagreus).

== Former gods ==
The Titans, as a group, represent a pre-Olympian order. Hesiod uses the expression "the former gods" (theoi proteroi) in reference to the Titans. They were the banished gods, who were no longer part of the upper world. Rather they were the gods who dwelt underground in Tartarus, and as such, they may have been thought of as "gods of the underworld", who were the antithesis of, and in opposition to, the Olympians, the gods of the heavens. Hesiod called the Titans "earth-born" (chthonic), and in the Homeric Hymn to Apollo, Hera prays to the Titans "who dwell beneath the earth", calling on them to aid her against Zeus, just as if they were chthonic spirits. In a similar fashion, in the Iliad, Hera, upon swearing an oath by the underworld river Styx, "invoked by name all the gods below Tartarus, that are called Titans" as witnesses.

They were not, as was once thought, the gods of an indigenous group in Greece, historically displaced by the new gods of Greek invaders. Rather, they were a group of gods whose mythology seems to have been borrowed from the Near East (see Near East origins, below). These imported gods gave context and provided a backstory for the Olympian gods, explaining where these Greek Olympian gods had come from, and how they had come to occupy their position of supremacy in the cosmos. The Titans were the previous generation, and family of gods, whom the Olympians had to overthrow, and banish from the upper world, in order to become the ruling pantheon of Greek gods.

For Hesiod, possibly in order to match the twelve Olympian gods, there were twelve Titans: six males and six females, with some of Hesiod's names perhaps being mere poetic inventions, so as to arrive at the right number. In Hesiod's Theogony, apart from Cronus, the Titans play no part at all in the overthrow of Uranus, and we only hear of their collective action in the Titanomachy, their war with the Olympians. As a group, they have no further role in conventional Greek myth, nor do they play any part in Greek cult.

As individuals, few of the Titans have any separate identity. Aside from Cronus, the only other figure Homer mentions by name as being a Titan is Iapetus. Some Titans seem only to serve a genealogical function, providing parents for more important offspring: Coeus and Phoebe as the parents of Leto, the mother, by Zeus, of the Olympians Apollo and Artemis; Hyperion and Theia as the parents of Helios, Selene and Eos; Iapetus as the father of Atlas and Prometheus; and Crius as the father of three sons Astraeus, Pallas, and Perses, who themselves seem only to exist to provide fathers for more important figures such as the Anemoi (Winds), Nike (Victory), and Hecate.

== Overthrown ==
The Titans play a key role in an important part of Greek mythology, the succession myth. It told how the Titan Cronus, the youngest of the Titans, overthrew Uranus, and how in turn Zeus, by waging and winning a great ten-year war pitting the new gods against the old gods, called the Titanomachy ("Titan war"), overthrew Cronus and his fellow Titans, and was eventually established as the final and permanent ruler of the cosmos.

=== Hesiod ===
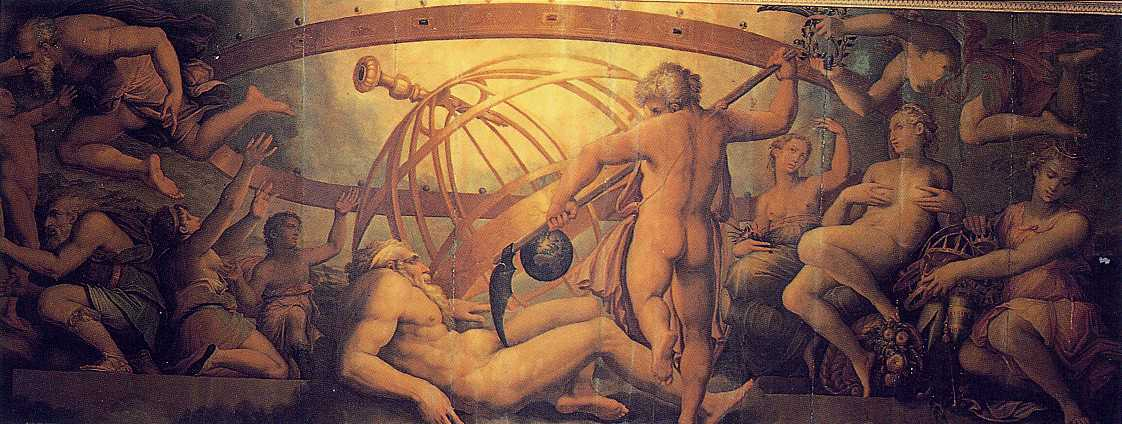
The Mutilation of Uranus by Saturn: fresco by Giorgio Vasari and Cristofano Gherardi, c. 1560 (Sala di Cosimo I, Palazzo Vecchio)

According to the standard version of the succession myth, given in Hesiod's Theogony, Uranus initially produced eighteen children with Gaia: the twelve Titans, the three Cyclopes, and the three Hecatoncheires (Hundred-Handers), but hating them, he hid them away somewhere inside Gaia. Angry and in distress, Gaia fashioned a sickle made of adamant and urged her children to punish their father. Only her son Cronus was willing. So Gaia hid Cronus in "ambush", gave him an adamantine sickle, and when Uranus came to lie with Gaia, Cronus reached out and castrated his father. This enabled the Titans to be born and Cronus to assume supreme command of the cosmos, with the Titans as his subordinates.

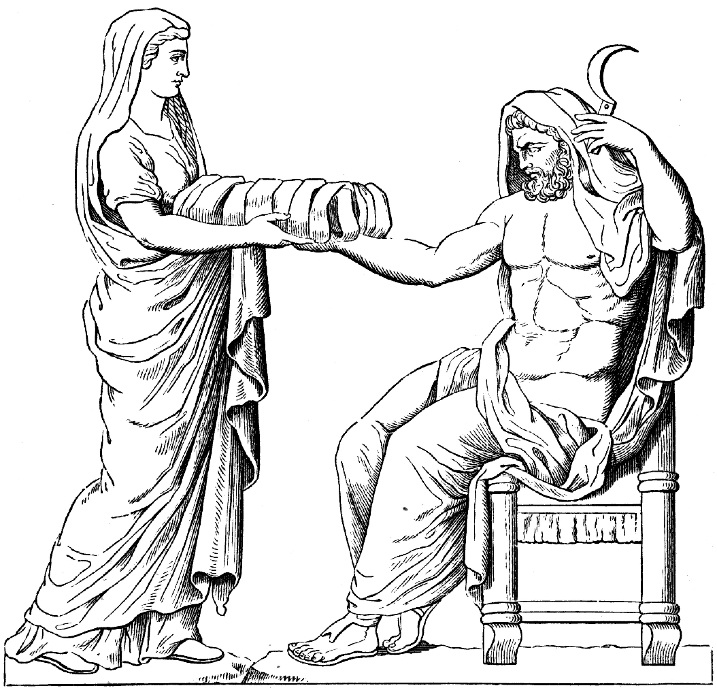
Rhea presenting Cronus the stone wrapped in cloth

Cronus, having now taken over control of the cosmos from Uranus, wanted to ensure that he maintained control. Uranus and Gaia had prophesied to Cronus that one of Cronus' own children would overthrow him, so when Cronus married Rhea, he made sure to swallow each of the children she birthed. This he did with the first five: Hestia, Demeter, Hera, Hades, Poseidon (in that order), to Rhea's great sorrow. However, when Rhea was pregnant with Zeus, Rhea begged her parents Gaia and Uranus to help her save Zeus. So they sent Rhea to Lyctus on Crete to bear Zeus, and Gaia took the newborn Zeus to raise, hiding him deep in a cave beneath Mount Aigaion. Meanwhile, Rhea gave Cronus a huge stone wrapped in baby's clothes which he swallowed thinking that it was another of Rhea's children.

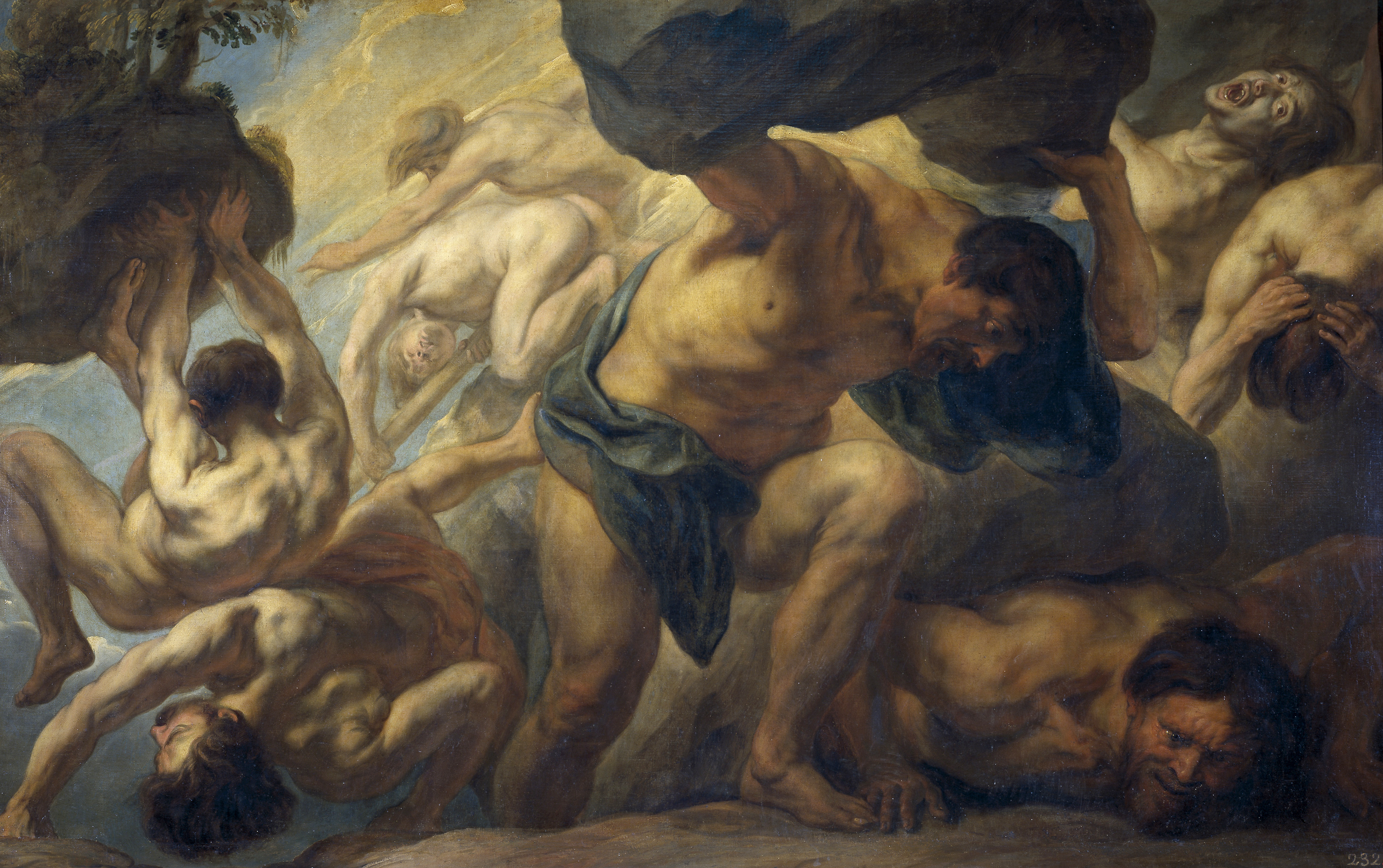
"Fall of the Titans". Oil on canvas by Jacob Jordaens, 1638.

Zeus, now grown, forced Cronus (using some unspecified trickery of Gaia) to disgorge his other five children. Zeus then released his uncles the Cyclopes (apparently still imprisoned beneath the earth, along with the Hundred-Handers, where Uranus had originally confined them) who then provide Zeus with his great weapon, the thunderbolt, which had been hidden by Gaia. A great war was begun, the Titanomachy, for control of the cosmos. The Titans fought from Mount Othrys, while the Olympians fought from Mount Olympus. In the tenth year of that great war, following Gaia's counsel, Zeus released the Hundred-Handers, who joined the war against the Titans, helping Zeus to gain the upper hand. Zeus cast the fury of his thunderbolt at the Titans, defeating them and throwing them into Tartarus, with the Hundred-Handers as their guards.

=== Homer ===
Only brief references to the Titans and the succession myth are found in Homer. In the Iliad, Homer tells us that "the gods ... that are called Titans" reside in Tartarus. Specifically, Homer says that "Iapetus and Cronos ... have joy neither in the rays of Helios Hyperion [the Sun] nor in any breeze, but deep Tartarus is round about them", and further, that Zeus "thrust Cronos down to dwell beneath earth and the unresting sea."

=== Other early sources ===
Brief mentions of the Titanomachy and the imprisonment of the Titans in Tartarus also occur in the Homeric Hymn to Apollo and Aeschylus' Prometheus Bound. In the Hymn, Hera, angry at Zeus, calls upon the "Titan gods who dwell beneath the earth about great Tartarus, and from whom are sprung both gods and men".

In Prometheus Bound, Prometheus (the son of the Titan Iapetus) refers to the Titanomachy, and his part in it:

When first the heavenly powers were moved to wrath, and mutual dissension was stirred up among them—some bent on casting Cronus from his seat so Zeus, in truth, might reign; others, eager for the contrary end, that Zeus might never win mastery over the gods—it was then that I, although advising them for the best, was unable to persuade the Titans, children of Heaven and Earth; but they, disdaining counsels of craft, in the pride of their strength thought to gain the mastery without a struggle and by force. ... That it was not by brute strength nor through violence, but by guile that those who should gain the upper hand were destined to prevail. And though I argued all this to them, they did not pay any attention to my words. With all that before me, it seemed best that, joining with my mother, I should place myself, a welcome volunteer, on the side of Zeus; and it is by reason of my counsel that the cavernous gloom of Tartarus now hides ancient Cronus and his allies within it.

Titanios was an ancient Titan associated with the region of Marathon in Attica. According to Philochorus and Istros, he was the only Titan who did not take part in the war against the gods.

=== Apollodorus ===
The mythographer Apollodorus, gives a similar account of the succession myth to Hesiod's, but with a few significant differences. According to Apollodorus, there were thirteen original Titans, adding the Titaness Dione to Hesiod's list. The Titans (instead of being Uranus' firstborn as in Hesiod) were born after the three Hundred-Handers and the three Cyclopes, and while Uranus imprisoned these first six of his offspring, he apparently left the Titans free. Not just Cronus, but all the Titans, except Oceanus, attacked Uranus. After Cronus castrated Uranus, the Titans freed the Hundred-Handers and Cyclopes (unlike in Hesiod, where they apparently remained imprisoned), and made Cronus their sovereign, who then reimprisoned the Hundred-Handers and Cyclopes in Tartarus.

Although Hesiod does not say how Zeus was eventually able to free his siblings, according to Apollodorus, Zeus was aided by Oceanus' daughter Metis, who gave Cronus an emetic which forced him to disgorge his children that he had swallowed. According to Apollodorus, in the tenth year of the ensuing war, Zeus learned from Gaia, that he would be victorious if he had the Hundred-Handers and the Cyclopes as allies. So Zeus slew their warder Campe (a detail not found in Hesiod) and released them, and in addition to giving Zeus his thunderbolt (as in Hesiod), the Cyclopes also gave Poseidon his trident, and Hades his helmet, and "with these weapons the gods overcame the Titans, shut them up in Tartarus, and appointed the Hundred-handers their guards".

=== Hyginus ===
The Roman mythographer Hyginus, in his Fabulae, gives an unusual (and perhaps confused) account of the Titanomachy. According to Hyginus the Titanomachy came about because of a dispute between Jupiter and Juno (the Roman equivalents of Zeus and Hera). Juno, Jupiter's jealous wife, was angry at her husband, on account of Jupiter's son Epaphus by Io (one of her husband's many lovers). Because of this Juno incited the Titans to rebel against Jupiter and restore Saturn (Cronus) to the kingship of the gods. Jupiter, with the help of Minerva (Athena), Apollo, and Diana (Artemis), put down the rebellion, and hurled the Titans (as in other accounts) down to Tartarus.

== After the Titanomachy ==
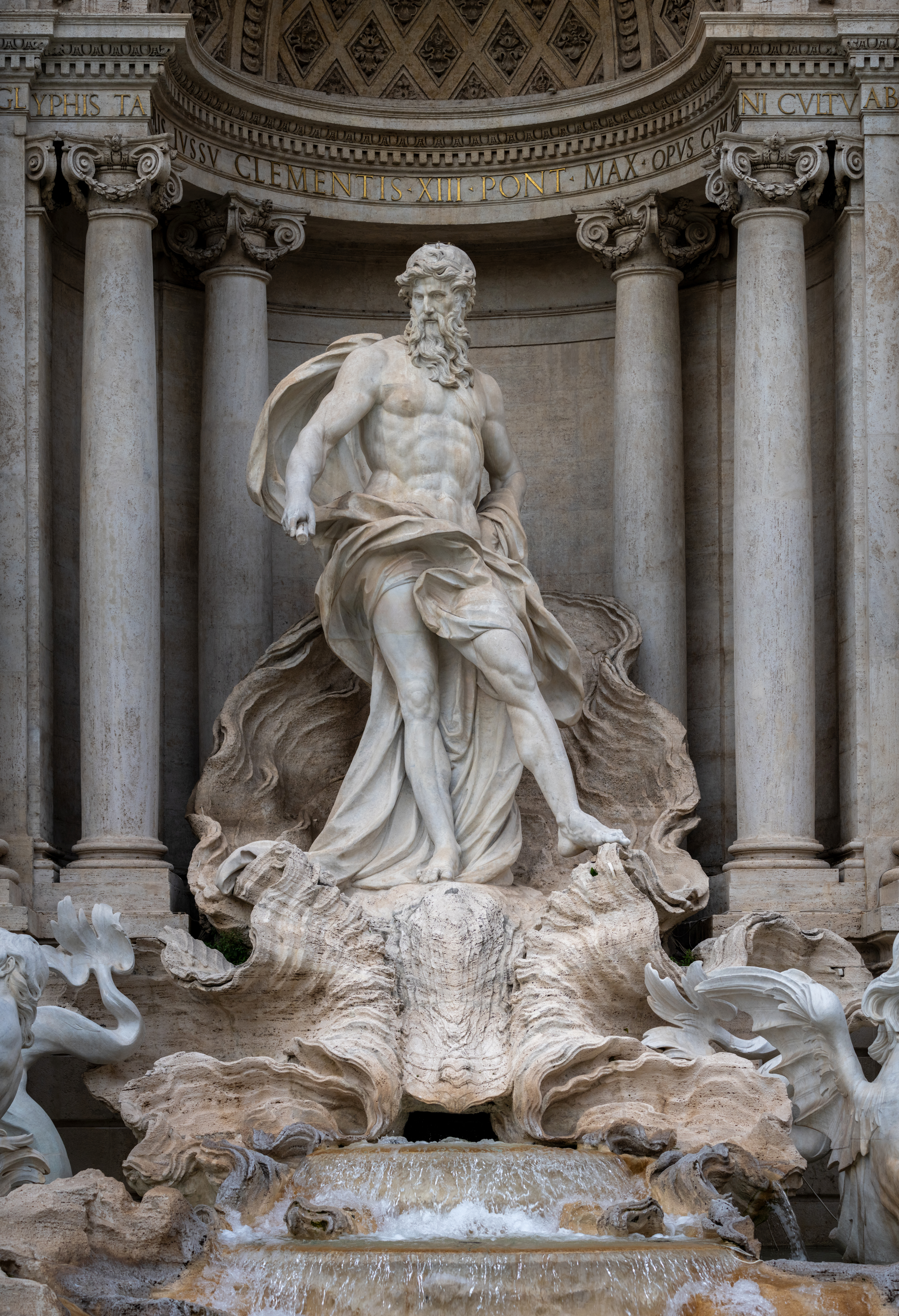
Oceanus, Trevi Fountain, Rome

After being overthrown in the Titanomachy, Cronus and his fellow vanquished Titans were cast into Tartarus:

That is where the Titan gods are hidden under murky gloom by the plans of the cloud-gatherer Zeus, in a dank place, at the farthest part of huge earth. They cannot get out, for Poseidon has set bronze gates upon it, and a wall is extended on both sides.

However, besides Cronus, exactly which of the other Titans were supposed to have been imprisoned in Tartarus is unclear. The only original Titan, mentioned by name, as being confined with Cronus in Tartarus, is Iapetus.

But, not all the Titans were imprisoned there. Certainly Oceanus, the great world encircling river, seems to have remained free, and in fact, seems not to have fought on the Titans' side at all. In Hesiod, Oceanus sends his daughter Styx, with her children Zelus (Envy), Nike (Victory), Kratos (Power), and Bia (Force), to fight on Zeus' side against the Titans, while in the Iliad, Hera says that, during the Titanomachy, she was cared for by Oceanus and his wife the Titaness Tethys. Aeschylus' Prometheus Bound, has Oceanus free to visit his nephew Prometheus sometime after the war. Like Oceanus, Helios, the Titan son of Hyperion, certainly remained free to drive his sun-chariot daily across the sky, taking an active part in events subsequent to the Titanomachy. The freedom of Oceanus, along with Helios (Sun), and perhaps Hyperion (to the extent that he also represented the Sun), would seem to be the result of cosmological necessity, for how could a world encircling river, or the Sun, be confined in Tartarus?

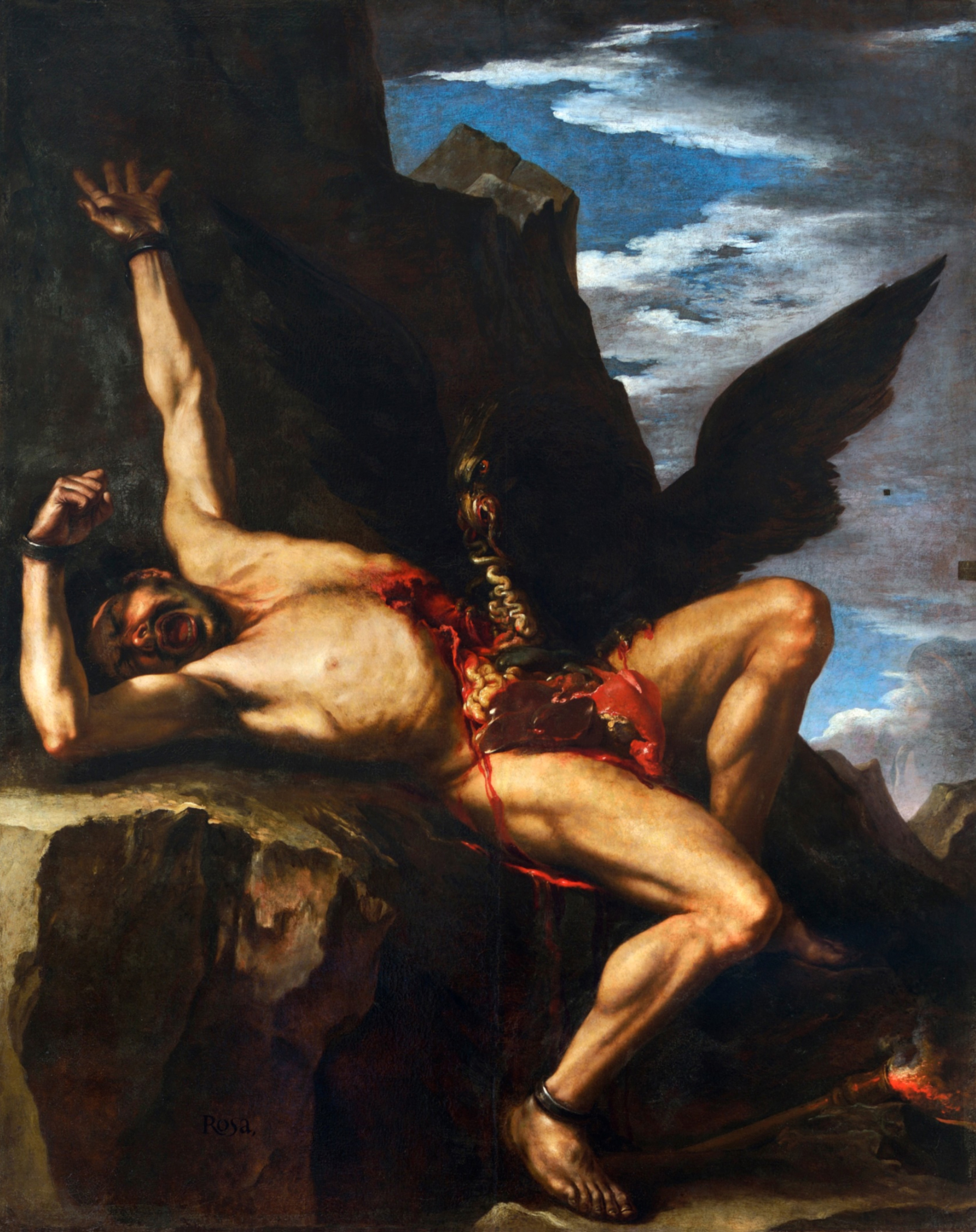
The Torture of Prometheus, painting by Salvator Rosa (1646–1648).

As for other male offspring of the Titans, some seem to have participated in the Titanomachy, and were punished as a result, and others did not, or at least (like Helios) remained free. Three of Iapetus' sons, Atlas, Menoetius, and Prometheus are specifically connected by ancient sources with the war. In the Theogony both Atlas and Menoetius received punishments from Zeus, but Hesiod does not say for what crime exactly they were punished. Atlas was famously punished by Zeus, by being forced to hold up the sky on his shoulders, but none of the early sources for this story (Hesiod, Homer, Pindar, and Aeschylus) say that his punishment was as a result of the war. According to Hyginus however, Atlas led the Titans in a revolt against Zeus (Jupiter). The Theogony has Menoetius struck down by Zeus' thunderbolt and cast into Erebus "because of his mad presumption and exceeding pride". Whether Hesiod was using Erebus as another name for Tartarus (as was sometimes done), or meant that Menoetius's punishment was because of his participation in the Titanomachy is unclear, and no other early source mentions this event, however Apollodorus says that it was. Hesiod does not mention Prometheus in connection with the Titanomachy, but Prometheus does remain free, in the Theogony, for his deception of Zeus at Mecone and his subsequent theft of fire, for which transgressions Prometheus was famously punished by Zeus by being chained to a rock where an eagle came to eat his "immortal liver" every day, which then grew back every night. However Aeschylus's Prometheus Bound (as mentioned above) does have Prometheus say that he was an ally of Zeus during the Titanomachy.

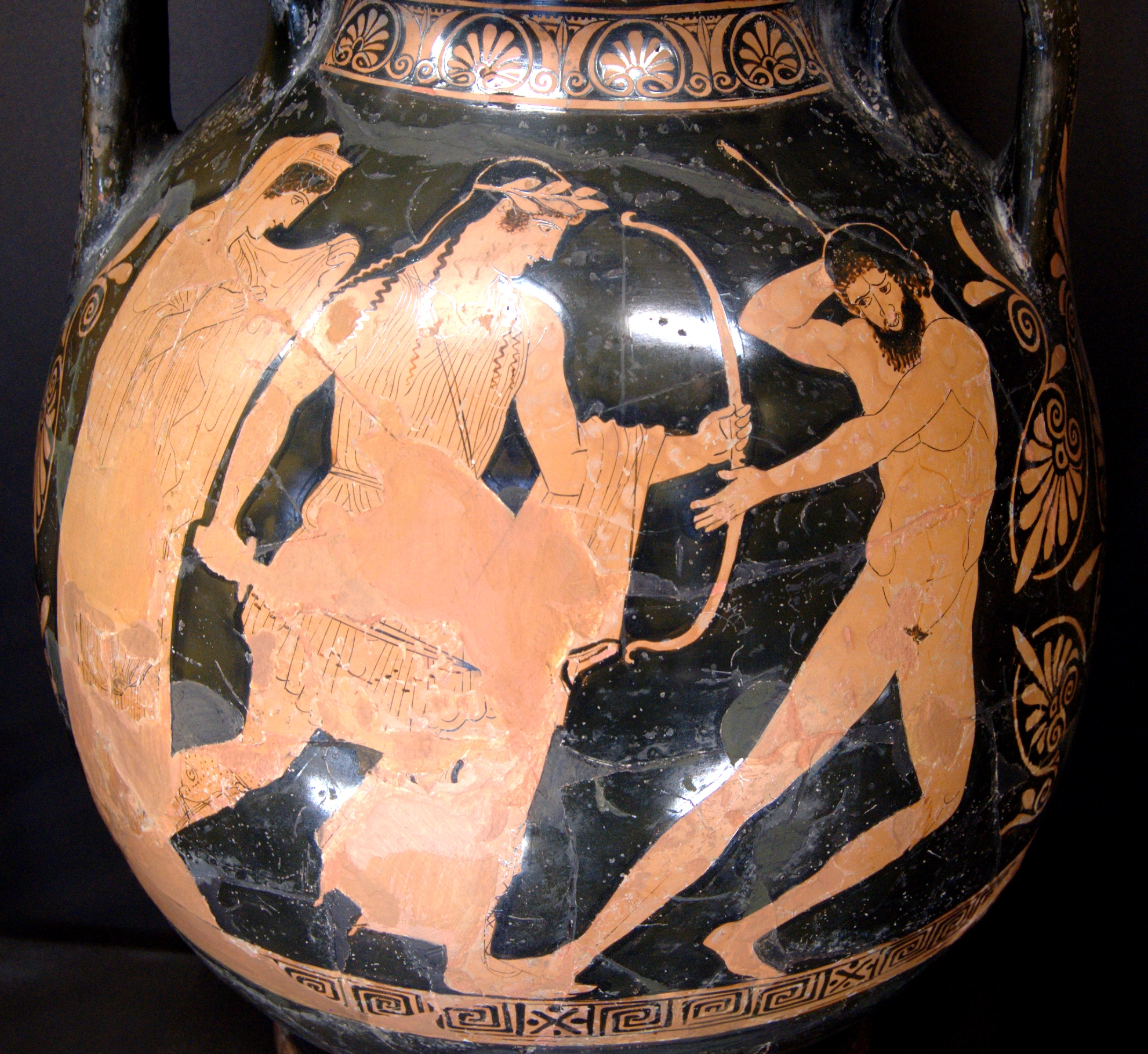
Apollo piercing with his arrows Tityos, who has tried to rape his mother Leto (c. 450–440 BC)

The female Titans, to the extent that they are mentioned at all, appear also to have been allowed to remain free. Three of these, according to the Theogony, become wives of Zeus: Themis, Mnemosyne, and Leto, the daughter of the Titans Coeus and Phoebe. Themis gives birth to the three Horae (Hours), and the three Moirai (Fates), and Mnemosyne gives birth to the nine Muses. Leto, who gives birth to the Olympians Apollo and Artemis, takes an active part on the side of the Trojans in the Iliad, and is also involved in the story of the giant Tityos. Tethys, presumably along with her husband Oceanus, took no part in the war, and, as mentioned above, provided safe refuge for Hera during the war. Rhea remains free and active after the war: appearing at Leto's delivery of Apollo, as Zeus' messenger to Demeter announcing the settlement concerning Persephone, bringing Pelops back to life.

=== Possible release ===
While in Hesiod's Theogony, and Homer's Iliad, Cronus and the other Titans are confined to Tartarus—apparently forever—another tradition, as indicated by later sources, seems to have had Cronus, or other of the Titans, being eventually set free. Pindar, in one of his poems (462 BC), says that, although Atlas still "strains against the weight of the sky ... Zeus freed the Titans", and in another poem (476 BC), Pindar has Cronus, in fact, ruling in the Isles of the Blessed, a land where the Greek heroes reside in the afterlife:

Those who have persevered three times, on either side, to keep their souls free from all wrongdoing, follow Zeus' road to the end, to the tower of Cronus, where ocean breezes blow around the island of the blessed, and flowers of gold are blazing, some from splendid trees on land, while water nurtures others. With these wreaths and garlands of flowers they entwine their hands according to the righteous counsels of Rhadamanthys, whom the great father, the husband of Rhea whose throne is above all others, keeps close beside him as his partner.

Prometheus Lyomenos, an undated lost play by Aeschylus (c. 525 – c. 455 BC), had a chorus composed of freed Titans. Possibly even earlier than Pindar and Aeschylus, two papyrus versions of a passage of Hesiods' Works and Days also mention Cronus being released by Zeus, and ruling over the heroes who go to the Isle of the Blessed; but other versions of Hesiod's text do not, and most editors judge these lines of text to be later interpolations.

== Near East origins ==
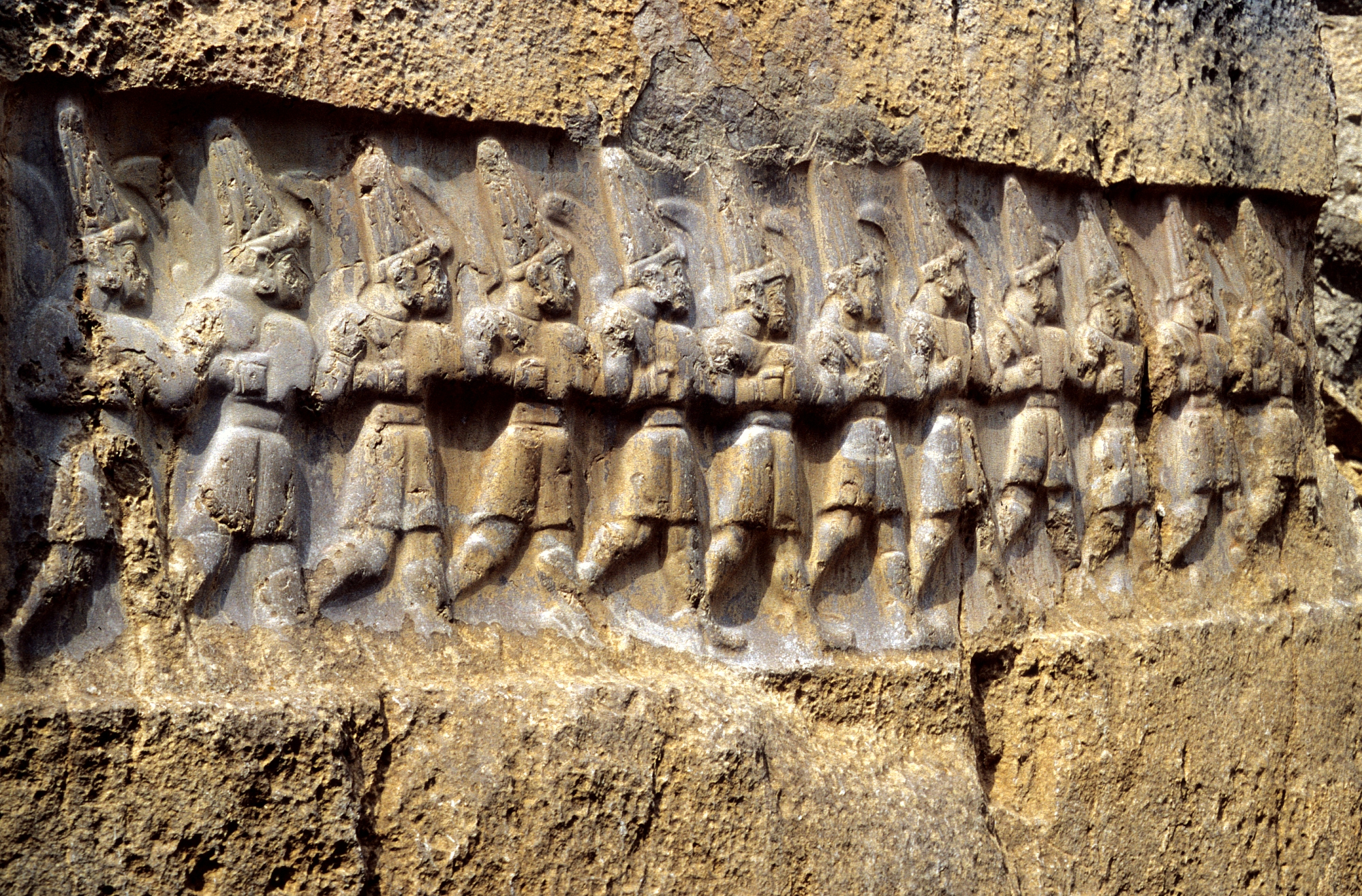
Ancient Hittite relief carving from chamber B of Yazılıkaya, a sanctuary at Hattusa, possibly depicting the twelve underworld gods, which the Hittites called the "former gods" (karuilies siunes), and identified with the Babylonian Anunnaki.

It is generally accepted that the Greek succession myth was imported from the Near East, and that along with this imported myth came stories of a group of former ruling gods, who had been defeated and displaced, and who became identified, by the Greeks, as the Titans. Features of Hesiod's account of the Titans can be seen in the stories of the Hurrians, the Hittites, the Babylonians, and other Near Eastern cultures.

The Hurro-Hittite text Song of Kumarbi (also called Kingship in Heaven), written five hundred years before Hesiod, tells of a succession of kings in heaven: Anu (Sky), Kumarbi, and the storm-god Teshub, with many striking parallels to Hesiod's account of the Greek succession myth. Like Cronus, Kumarbi castrates the sky-god Anu, and takes over his kingship. And like Cronus, Kumarbi swallows gods (and a stone?), one of whom is the storm-god Teshub, who like the storm-god Zeus, is apparently victorious against Kumarbi and others in a war of the gods.

Other Hittite texts contain allusions to "former gods" (karuilies siunes), precisely what Hesiod called the Titans, theoi proteroi. Like the Titans, these Hittite karuilies siunes, were twelve (usually) in number and end up confined in the underworld by the storm-god Teshub, imprisoned by gates they cannot open. In Hurrian, the Hittite's karuilies siunes were known as the "gods of down under" (enna durenna) and the Hittites identified these gods with the Anunnaki, the Babylonian gods of the underworld, whose defeat and imprisonment by the storm-god Marduk, in the Babylonian poem Enûma Eliš (late second millennium BC or earlier), parallels the defeat and imprisonment of the Titans. Other collectivities of gods, perhaps associated with the Mesopotamian Anunnaki, include the Dead Gods (Dingiruggû), the Banished Gods (ilāni darsūti), and the Defeated (or Bound) Gods (ilāni kamûti).

== Orphic literature ==
=== The sparagmos ===
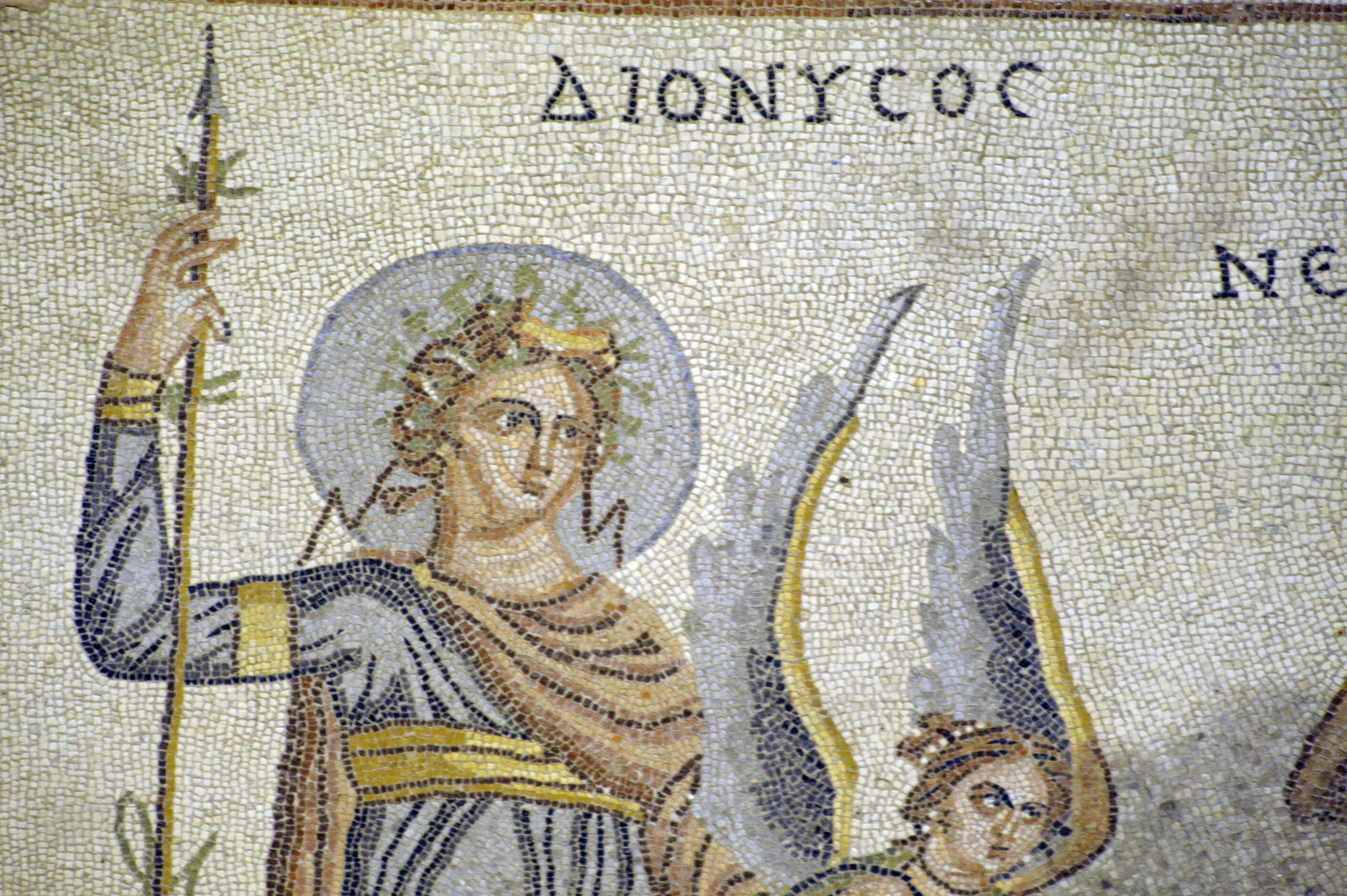
Dionysus in a mosaic from the House of Poseidon, Zeugma Mosaic Museum

In Orphic literature, the Titans play an important role in what is often considered to be the central myth of Orphism, the sparagmos, that is the dismemberment of Dionysus, who in this context is often given the title Zagreus. As pieced together from various ancient sources, the reconstructed story, usually given by modern scholars, goes as follows. Zeus had intercourse with Persephone in the form of a serpent, producing Dionysus. He is taken to Mount Ida where (like the infant Zeus) he is guarded by the dancing Curetes. Zeus intended Dionysus to be his successor as ruler of the cosmos, but a jealous Hera incited the Titans—who apparently unlike in Hesiod and Homer, were not imprisoned in Tartarus—to kill the child. The Titans whiten their faces with gypsum, and distracting the infant Dionysus with various toys, including a mirror, they seized Dionysus and tore (or cut) him to pieces. The pieces were then boiled, roasted and partially eaten, by the Titans. But Athena managed to save Dionysus' heart, by which Zeus was able to contrive his rebirth from Semele.

=== The anthropogony ===
Commonly presented as a part of the myth of the dismembered Dionysus Zagreus, is an Orphic anthropogony, that is an Orphic account of the origin of human beings. According to this widely held view, as punishment for their crime, Zeus struck the Titans with his thunderbolt, and from the remains of the destroyed Titans humankind was born, which resulted in a human inheritance of ancestral guilt, for this original sin of the Titans, and by some accounts "formed the basis for an Orphic doctrine of the divinity of man." However, when and to what extent there existed any Orphic tradition which included these elements is the subject of open debate.

The 2nd century AD biographer and essayist Plutarch makes a connection between the sparagmos and the punishment of the Titans, but makes no mention of the anthropogony, or Orpheus, or Orphism. In his essay On the Eating of Flesh, Plutarch writes of "stories told about the sufferings and dismemberment of Dionysus and the outrageous assaults of the Titans upon him, and their punishment and blasting by thunderbolt after they had tasted his blood". While, according to the early 4th century AD Christian apologist Arnobius, and the 5th century AD Greek epic poet Nonnus, it is as punishment for their murder of Dionysus that the Titans end up imprisoned by Zeus in Tartarus.

The only ancient source to explicitly connect the sparagmos and the anthropogony is the 6th century AD Neoplatonist Olympiodorus, who writes that, according to Orpheus, after the Titans had dismembered and eaten Dionysus, "Zeus, angered by the deed, blasts them with his thunderbolts, and from the sublimate of the vapors that rise from them comes the matter from which men are created." Olympiodorus goes on to conclude that, because the Titans had eaten his flesh, we their descendants, are a part of Dionysus.

=== Modern interpretations ===
Some 19th- and 20th-century scholars, including Jane Ellen Harrison, have argued that an initiatory or shamanic ritual underlies the myth of the dismemberment and cannibalism of Dionysus by the Titans. Martin Litchfield West also asserts this in relation to shamanistic initiatory rites of early Greek religious practices.

== Etymology ==
The etymology of Τιτᾶνες (Titanes) is uncertain. Hesiod in the Theogony gives a double etymology, deriving it from titaino [to strain] and tisis [vengeance], saying that Uranus gave them the name Titans: "in reproach, for he said that they strained and did presumptuously a fearful deed, and that vengeance for it would come afterwards". But modern scholars doubt Hesiod's etymology.

Jane Ellen Harrison asserts that the word "Titan" comes from the Greek τίτανος, signifying white "earth, clay, or gypsum", and that the Titans were "white clay men", or men covered by white clay or gypsum dust in their rituals.

== In astronomy ==
The planet Saturn is named for the Roman equivalent of the Titan Cronus. Saturn's largest moon, Titan, is named after the Titans generally, and the other moons of Saturn are named after individual Titans, specifically Tethys, Phoebe, Rhea, Hyperion, and Iapetus. Astronomer William Henry Pickering claimed to have discovered another moon of Saturn which he named Themis, but this discovery was never confirmed, and the name Themis was given to an asteroid, 24 Themis. Asteroid 57 Mnemosyne was also named for the Titan.

A proto-planet Theia is hypothesized to have been involved in a collision in the early solar system, forming the Earth's moon.

== See also ==
- Annunaki
- Asura
- Elohim
- Giants (Greek mythology)
- Greek primordial deities
- Jötunn
- Titans in popular culture
- Vanir
