= Subtitle (titling) =

Explanatory or alternate title

In books and other works, the subtitle is an explanatory title added by the author to the title proper of a work. A different kind of subtitle, often used in the past, is the alternative title, also called alternate title, traditionally denoted and added to the title with the alternative conjunction "or" – hence its name.

As an example, Mary Shelley gave her most famous novel the title Frankenstein; or, The Modern Prometheus, where "or, The Modern Prometheus" is the alternative title. She references Prometheus, one of the Greek Titans, as a hint of the novel's themes.

A more modern usage is simply to separate the subtitle by punctuation, making the subtitle more of a continuation or sub-element of the title proper.

In library cataloging and in bibliography, the subtitle does not include an alternative title, which is defined as part of the title proper. For example, One Good Turn: A Natural History of the Screwdriver and the Screw is filed as "One Good Turn (title)" and "A Natural History of the Screwdriver and the Screw (subtitle)", while Twelfth Night, or What You Will is filed as "Twelfth Night, or What You Will (title)".

== Literature ==
Subtitles and alternative titles for plays were fashionable in the Elizabethan era. William Shakespeare parodied this vogue by giving the comedy Twelfth Night his only subtitle, the deliberately uninformative or What You Will, implying that the subtitle can be whatever the audience wants it to be.

In printing, subtitles often appear below the title in a less prominent typeface or following the title after a colon.

Some modern publishers choose to forget subtitles when republishing historical works, such as Shelley's famous story, which is often now sold simply as Frankenstein.

== Non-fiction ==
In political philosophy, for example, the 16th-century theorist Thomas Hobbes named his magnum opus Leviathan or The Matter, Forme and Power of a Common-Wealth Ecclesiasticall and Civil, using the subtitle to explain the subject matter of the book.

== Film and other media ==
In film, examples of subtitles using "or" include Dr. Strangelove or: How I Learned to Stop Worrying and Love the Bomb and Birdman or (The Unexpected Virtue of Ignorance).

Subtitles are also used to distinguish different installments in a series, instead of or in addition to a number, such as: Pirates of the Caribbean: Dead Man's Chest, the second in the Pirates of the Caribbean film series; Mario Kart: Super Circuit, the third in the Mario Kart video game series; and Star Trek II: The Wrath of Khan, the second in the Star Trek film series.
