= Prometheus (Wagner-Régeny) =

Prometheus is an operatic 'Szenisches Oratorium' (scenic oratorio) in five scenes by Rudolf Wagner-Régeny, with a German libretto by the composer after Aeschylus. The opera also uses Goethe's poem "Prometheus".

== Performance history ==
It was first performed on 12 September 1959 at the Staatstheater Kassel and revived in concert three times in East Berlin between 1960 and 1984.

== Roles ==
Roles, voice types
Role	Voice type
Prometheus	baritone
Macht (Power)	baritone
Gewalt (Force)	bass
Hephaistos (Hephaestus)	tenor
Okeanos (Oceanus)	bass
Io	mezzo-soprano
Hermes	tenor

== Synopsis ==
Prometheus, chained to his rock by Zeus, prophesies that the saviour of mankind will appear after ten generations.
