= Alternative title (publishing) =

Practice of adding "or" before subtitle in publishing

An alternative title or alternate title in book publishing refers to a title that is presented alongside the primary title. It often uses a semi-colon or the term "or" in book titles, typically seen in the form "Title: or, Subtitle." This was a practice that started in the 17th century, and was common in both English and American literature. During this period, many books aimed to appeal to a broader audience by using more descriptive subtitles.

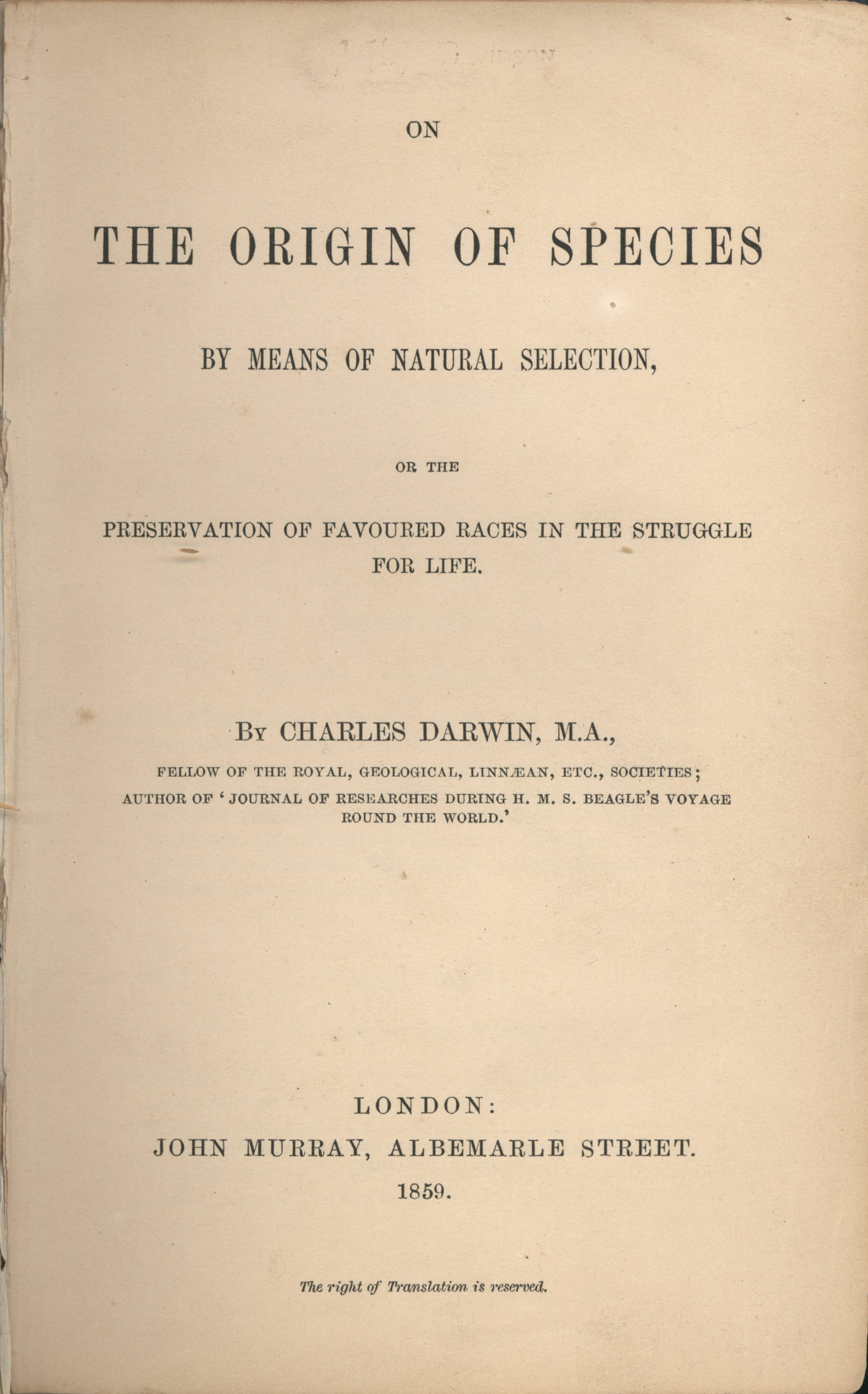
Title page of the 1859 edition of On the Origin of Species

As an example, Mary Shelley gave her most famous novel the title Frankenstein; or, The Modern Prometheus, where or, The Modern Prometheus is the alternative title, by which she references the Greek Titan as a hint of the novel's themes. More examples are On the Origin of Species by Means of Natural Selection, or the Preservation of Favoured Races in the Struggle for Life and Moby-Dick; or, The Whale. This is contrasted to a subtitle, which is a portion of the title itself. The subtitle is considered to add extra explanation for the title.

This convention started to decline in the 19th century as book titles became more concise and marketing strategies evolved.
