= Olga Raggio =

American art historian

Olga Raggio (5 February 1926 – 24 January 2009) was an art historian and curator who worked with the Metropolitan Museum of Art for over 60 years, and discovered the 'lost' bust of Cosimo I de' Medici by Bartolommeo Bandinelli.

== Early life ==
Olga Raggio was born in Rome on 5 February 1926. Her father was Italian, while her mother was Russian.

Raggio graduated from the Vatican Library with a diploma in library science in 1947, and obtained a PhD from the University of Rome in 1949.

== Career ==
=== Metropolitan Museum ===
In 1950, Raggio received a Fulbright Fellowship to Columbia University. She also joined the Metropolitan Museum of Art in New York as a junior research fellow.

Raggio's curatorial career climbed steadily, from assistant curator in 1954 to full curator in 1968, and chair of the department of European Sculpture and Decorative Arts between 1971 and 2001. Her responsibilities encompassed the entirety of the museum's art collections dating between 1400 and 1900 other than painting or drawing. She was mentioned as a candidate to succeed Thomas Hoving as the Metropolitan Museum's director in 1977, but the post went to Philippe de Montebello.

Raggio's research concentrated on Renaissance and Baroque sculpture, notably Alessandro Algardi and Gianlorenzo Bernini. Her other contributions include a study, reconstruction and installation in the museum of the Blumenthal Patio from the Spanish castle of Vélez Blanco in 1964; the chapel of Bastie d'Urfé; and the conservation of Federico da Montefeltro's studiolo (private study) taken from the ducal palace of Gubbio. Her investigations resulted in the rediscovery of two sculptures (Priapus and Flora) by the Berninis, father and son, which were found in the garden of Delbarton School in a Benedictine abbey in Morristown, New Jersey, as well as a bust of Cosimo I de' Medici by Baccio Bandinelli, which had been locked away in a vault in a Swiss bank.

Raggio organised some of the museum's most famous exhibitions including The Splendour of Dresden (1978) and The Vatican Collections: The Papacy and Art (1983).

Raggio retired as Distinguished Research Curator on 31 December 2008.

=== Academic ===
In 1964, Raggio became an adjunct faculty at the New York University Institute of Fine Arts. She taught courses informed by her own research interest, notably Alessandro Algardi, Italian renaissance bronzes and the Studiolo.

== Later life ==
Olga Raggio died of cancer on 24 January 2009, aged 82, in the Bronx.

== Bibliography ==
- Raggio, Olga (1958). "The Myth of Prometheus: Its Survival and Metamorphoses up to the Eighteenth Century". Journal of the Warburg and Courtauld Institutes. 21 (1–2): 44–62. doi:10.2307/750486. JSTOR 750486.
- Raggio, Olga (December 1964). "The Vélez Blanco Patio: An Italian Renaissance Monument From Spain". The Metropolitan Museum of Art Bulletin. 23 (4): 141–176. doi:10.2307/3258177. JSTOR 3258177.
- Raggio, Olga (February 1967). "Two Great Portraits by Lemoyne and Pigalle". The Metropolitan Museum of Art Bulletin. 25 (6): 219–229. doi:10.2307/3258329. JSTOR 3258329.
- Raggio, Olga (1981). "Tiziano Aspetti's Reliefs with Scenes of the Martyrdom of St. Daniel of Padua". Metropolitan Museum Journal. 16: 131–146. doi:10.2307/1512773. JSTOR 1512773. S2CID 191390032.
- Olga Raggio; Antoine M. Wilmering (1999). The Gubbio Studiolo and Its Conservation. Metropolitan Museum of Art. ISBN 978-0-87099-925-3.
- Abramitis, Dorothy; Raggio, Olga (2005). "A Giustiniani Bacchus and François Duquesnoy". Metropolitan Museum Journal. 40.
- Raggio, Olga (2006). "Two Allegorical Sculptures by Francesco Ladatte". Metropolitan Museum Journal. 41: 121–131. doi:10.1086/met.41.20320664. S2CID 191382730.
