= Rudolf Wagner-Régeny =

Hungarian composer, conductor and pianist (1903–1969)

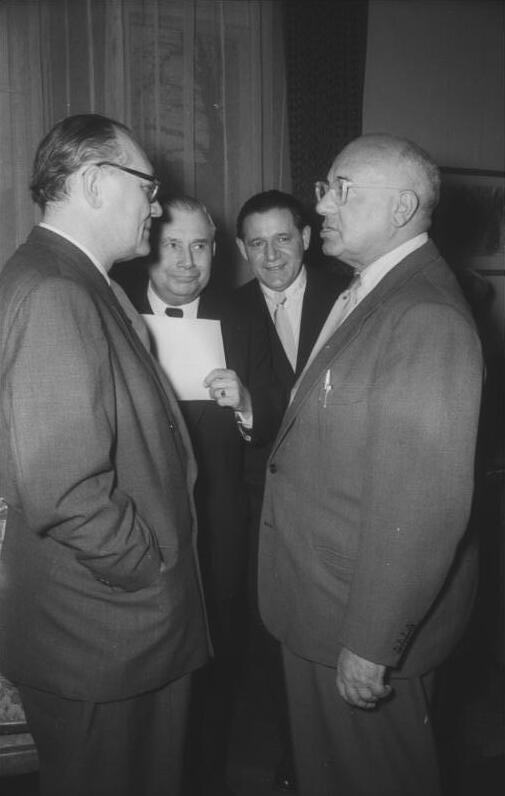
Rudolf Wagner-Régeny (on the left) in 1955

Rudolf Wagner-Régeny (28 August 1903, Szászrégen, Transylvania, Kingdom of Hungary, Austro-Hungarian Empire (now Reghin, Romania) – 18 September 1969, Berlin) was a composer, conductor, and pianist. Born in Transylvania, Kingdom of Hungary, since 1920 Romania, he became a German citizen in 1930, and then East German after 1945.

From 1919 to 1920 he studied at the Leipzig Conservatory. In 1920 he enrolled at the Berlin Hochschule für Musik as a student of Rudolf Krasselt and Siegfried Ochs for conducting, and for orchestration of Emil von Řezníček, and with Friedrich Koch and Franz Schreker for musical composition, graduating in 1923. He served as choirsmaster at the Volksoper Berlin from 1923 to 1925. In 1927 joined Laban's dance company where he conducted productions for three years.

Wagner-Régeny first gained notice as a composer with his theatre pieces for Essen. In 1929 he met the designer Caspar Neher, who wrote the texts for Wagner-Régeny's best-known operas. In 1930 Wagner-Régeny became a naturalized German citizen, and married, his wife being half-Jewish. Between 1930 and 1945 he worked as a freelance composer and teacher, and with the rise of the Nazis was promoted by a faction of the party as a composer of the future despite the stylistic closeness of his music to the proscribed Kurt Weill. He managed to gain the friendship and esteem of Baldur von Schirach and his works were performed by Karl Böhm and Herbert von Karajan. However, the success of his opera Der Günstling (after Georg Büchner, Dresden, February 20, 1935) was followed by doubts regarding his subsequent output, ending in a scandal with his opera Johanna Balk at the Vienna State Opera (April 4, 1941), which aroused the ire of Joseph Goebbels. As punishment, Wagner-Regény was drafted into the military in 1942 (or 1943), though he managed to secure a desk job in the army, and survived the war.

After the close of World War II, Rudolf Wagner-Régeny opted for East instead of West Germany. He was director of the Rostock University of Music and Theatre from 1947 to 1950. In 1950 he was appointed as a professor of composition at the (East) Berlin Hochschule für Musik and at the Academy of Arts. He continued to work there until illness prevented it in 1968.

As a composer, Wagner-Regény wrote numerous symphonic works and chamber works. He composed 12 operas of which Die Bürger von Calais (1936, libretto by Neher), Johanna Balk (1938), Das Bergwerk zu Falun (1958, after ETA Hoffmann) (cf. "The Mines of Falun") and Prometheus (1959) are considered his best work. His 1958 ballet Tristan is also greatly admired. He struggled to find a musical language distinct from the extremes of modernism but without any association with fascist aesthetics. His early compositions were inspired by Busoni, Kurt Weill and Schoenberg. His theatre collaborations with Neher and Bertolt Brecht were also of importance for the development of his style. After composing works along traditional lines, he adopted his own twelve-tone serial technique in 1950. In their transparency and austerity, his stage works follow the music theatre of Weill and Hanns Eisler and somewhat parallel those of Boris Blacher.

== Works ==
Stage works

- Moschopuls (première, Gera, 1928)
- Der nackte König (Gera, 1928)
- Sganarelle or Der Schein trügt (Essen, 1929)
- La sainte courtisane (Gera, 1930)
- Der Günstling (Dresden, 1935)
- Die Bürger von Calais (Berlin, 1939)
- Johanna Balk (Vienna, 1941)
- Prometheus (Kassel, 1959)
- Das Bergwerk zu Falun (Salzburg, 1961)
- Persische Episoden (Rostock, 1963)

Instrumental music

- Orchestral music with piano, 1935
- String quartet, 1948
- Two dances for Palucca, 1950
- Three orchestral pieces: Mythological Figures, 1951
- Three orchestral sets, 1952
- Seven fugues, 1953
- Introduction and ode for symphonic orchestra, 1967

Vocal music

- 10 Lieder on texts by Brecht, 1950
- Cantata “Genesis”, 1956
- Jüdische Chronik, 1961
- Hermann Hesse songs "Gesänge des Abschieds", 1968/69
- Three Fontane-Lieder, 1969

== Sources ==
- David Drew. The New Grove Dictionary of Opera, edited by Stanley Sadie (1992), ISBN 0-333-73432-7 and ISBN 1-56159-228-5
- The American Symphony Orchestra will perform the US Premiere of Mythological Figures (1951) in 2009
