= Atlas (mythology) =

Deity in Greek mythology

- Member of the Titans
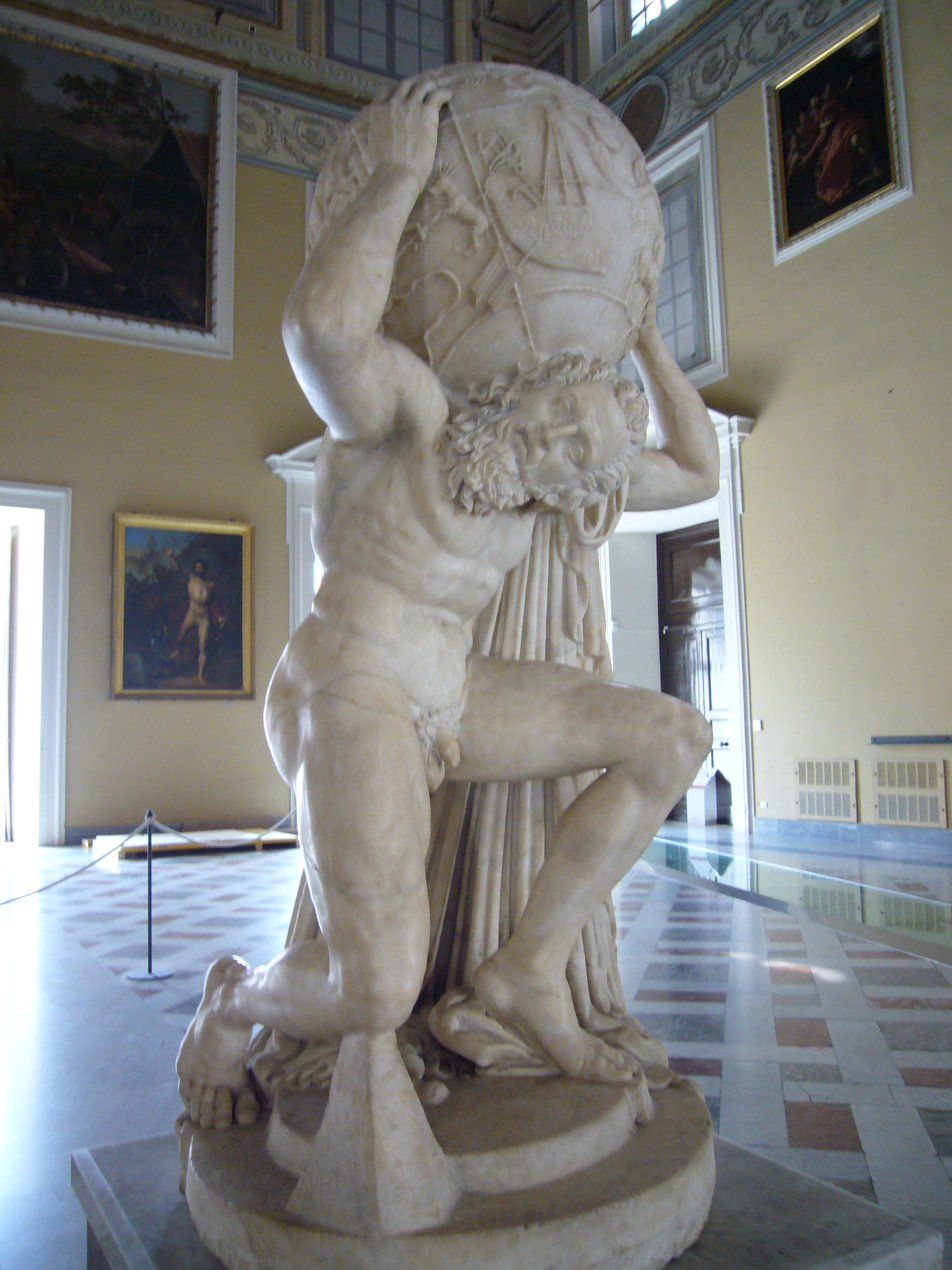
- The Farnese Atlas, the oldest surviving depiction of the celestial sphere as a celestial globe.
- Abode: Western edge of the Earth, Mauretania.

Genealogy
- Parents: Iapetus (father); Asia or Clymene (mother)
- Siblings: Prometheus, Epimetheus, Menoetius
- Consort: Pleione, Hesperis
- Children: Hesperides, Hyades, Pleiades, Hyas, Calypso, Dione

In Greek mythology, Atlas (/ˈætləs/; Ancient Greek: Ἄτλας, romanized: Átlas) is a Titan condemned to hold up the heavens or sky for eternity after the Titanomachy. Atlas also plays a role in the myths of two of the greatest Greek heroes: Heracles (Hercules in Roman mythology) and Perseus. According to the ancient Greek poet Hesiod, Atlas stood at the ends of the earth in the extreme west. Later, he became commonly identified with the Atlas Mountains in northwest Africa. Atlas was said to have been skilled in philosophy, mathematics, and astronomy. In antiquity, he was credited with inventing the first celestial sphere. In some texts, he is even credited with the invention of astronomy itself.

Atlas was the son of the Titan Iapetus and the Oceanid Asia or Clymene. He was a brother of Menoetius, Epimetheus and Prometheus. He had many children, mostly daughters, the Hesperides, the Hyades, the Pleiades, and the nymph Calypso who lived on the island Ogygia.

Flemish cartographer Gerardus Mercator characterized Atlas as the founder of geography, leading to the modern sense of the term "atlas" for a collection of maps after Mercator published his own work in honor of the Titan.

The "Atlantic Ocean" is derived from "Sea of Atlas." The name of Atlantis mentioned in Plato's Timaeus dialogue derives from "Atlantis nesos" (Ancient Greek: Ἀτλαντὶς νῆσος), literally meaning "Atlantean Island".

== Etymology ==
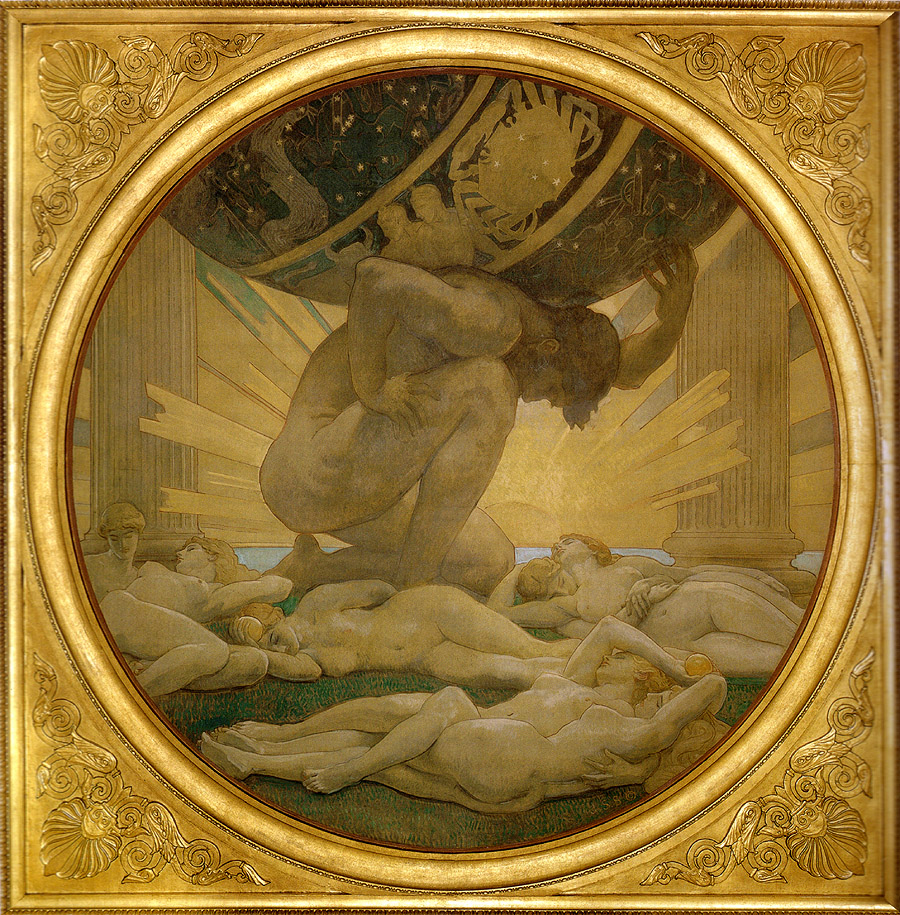
Atlas and the Hesperides by John Singer Sargent (1925).

The etymology of the name Atlas is uncertain. Virgil translated etymologies of Greek names by combining them with adjectives that explained them: for Atlas his adjective is durus, "hard, enduring", which suggested to George Doig that Virgil was aware of the Greek τλῆναι "to endure"; Doig offers the further possibility that Virgil was aware of Strabo's remark that the native North African name for this mountain was Douris. Since the Atlas Mountains rise in the region inhabited by Berbers, it has been suggested that the name might be taken from one of the Berber languages, specifically from the word ádrār "mountain".

Traditionally historical linguists etymologize the Ancient Greek word Ἄτλας (genitive: Ἄτλαντος) as comprised from copulative α- and the Proto-Indo-European root *telh₂- 'to uphold, support' (whence also τλῆναι), and which was later reshaped to an nt-stem. However, Robert S. P. Beekes argues that it cannot be expected that this ancient Titan carries an Indo-European name, and he suggests instead that the word is of Pre-Greek origin, as such words often end in -ant.

== Mythology ==
=== War and punishment ===
Atlas and his brother Menoetius sided with the Titans in their war against the Olympians, the Titanomachy. When the Titans were defeated, many of them (including Menoetius) were confined to Tartarus, but Zeus condemned Atlas to stand at the western edge of the earth and hold up the sky on his shoulders. Thus, he was Atlas Telamon, "enduring Atlas", and became a doublet of Coeus, the embodiment of the celestial axis around which the heavens revolve.

A common misconception today is that Atlas's sentence was to hold the Earth on his shoulders, but Classical art shows Atlas holding the celestial spheres, not the terrestrial globe; the solidity of the marble globe borne by the Farnese Atlas may have aided the conflation, reinforced in the 16th century by the developing usage of atlas to describe a corpus of terrestrial maps.

=== Encounter with Perseus ===
The Greek poet Polyidus c. 398 BC tells a tale of Atlas, then a shepherd, encountering Perseus who turned him to stone. Ovid later gives a more detailed account of the incident, combining it with the myth of Heracles. In this account Atlas is not only a shepherd but also a king. According to Ovid, Perseus arrives in Atlas's Kingdom and asks for shelter, declaring he is a son of Zeus. Atlas, fearful of a prophecy that warned of a son of Zeus stealing his golden apples from his orchard, refuses Perseus hospitality. In this account, Atlas is turned not just into stone by Perseus, but an entire mountain range: Atlas's head the peak, his shoulders ridges and his hair woods. The prophecy did not relate to Perseus stealing the golden apples but to Heracles, another son of Zeus, and Perseus's great-grandson.

=== Encounter with Heracles ===
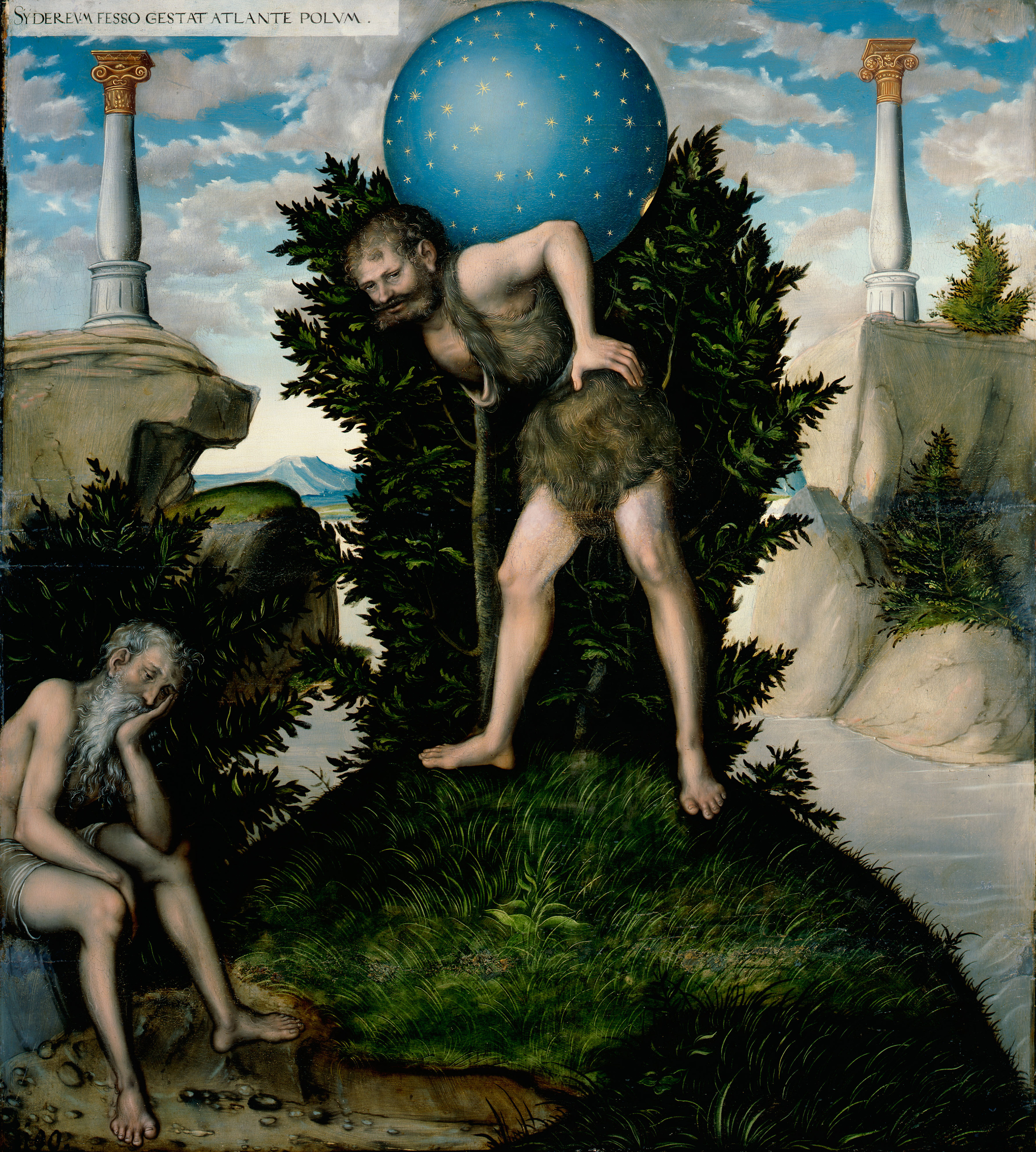
Herkules und Atlas by Lucas Cranach the Elder

One of the Twelve Labours of the hero Heracles was to fetch some of the golden apples that grow in Hera's garden, tended by Atlas's reputed daughters, the Hesperides (which were also called the Atlantides), and guarded by the dragon Ladon. Heracles went to Atlas and offered to hold up the heavens while Atlas got the apples from his daughters.

Upon his return with the apples, however, Atlas attempted to trick Heracles into carrying the sky permanently by offering to deliver the apples himself, as anyone who purposely took the burden must carry it forever, or until someone else took it away. Heracles, suspecting Atlas did not intend to return, pretended to agree to Atlas's offer, asking only that Atlas take the sky again for a few minutes so Heracles could rearrange his cloak as padding on his shoulders. When Atlas set down the apples and took the heavens upon his shoulders again, Heracles took the apples and ran away.

In some versions, Heracles instead built the two great Pillars of Hercules to hold the sky away from the earth, liberating Atlas much as he liberated Prometheus.

== Other mythological characters named Atlas ==
Besides the Titan, there are other mythological characters who were also called Atlas:

=== King of Atlantis ===
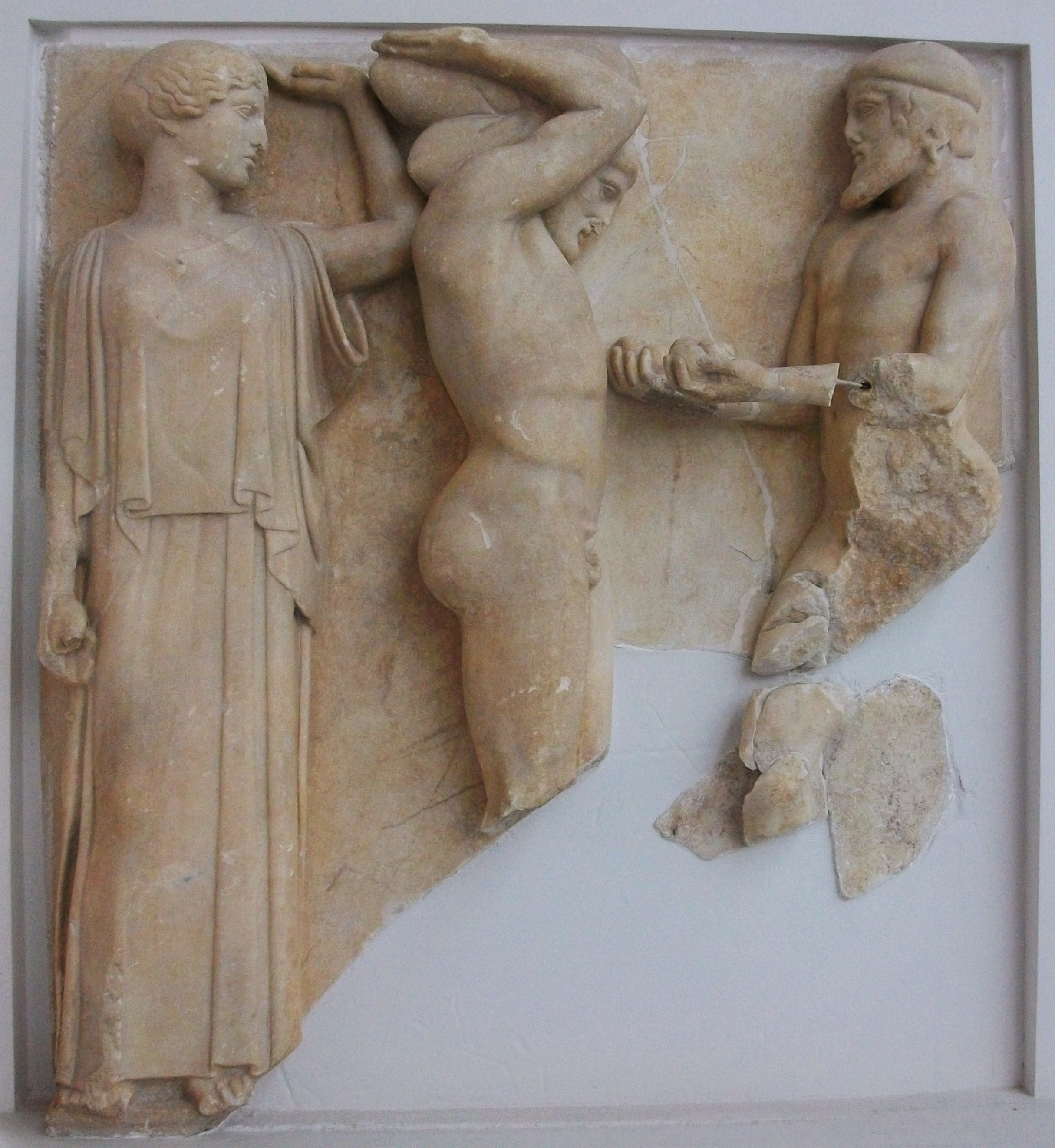
Atlas and Heracles, metope from the temple of Zeus at Olympia.

According to Plato, the first king of Atlantis was also named Atlas, but that Atlas was a son of Poseidon and the mortal woman Cleito. The works of Eusebius and Diodorus also give an account of Atlas. In these, Atlas's father was Uranus and his mother was Gaia. His grandfather was Elium "King of Phoenicia" who lived in Byblos with his wife Beruth. Atlas was raised by his sister, Basilia.

=== King of Mauretania ===
Atlas was also a legendary king of Mauretania, the land of the Mauri in antiquity roughly corresponding with modern Morocco and Algeria. In the 16th century, Gerardus Mercator put together the first collection of maps to be called an "Atlas" and devoted his book to the "King of Mauretania".

Atlas became associated with Northwest Africa over time. He had been connected with the Hesperides, or "Nymphs", which guarded the golden apples, and Gorgons both of which were said to live beyond Ocean in the extreme west of the world since Hesiod's Theogony. Diodorus and Palaephatus mention that the Gorgons lived in the Gorgades, islands in the Aethiopian Sea. The main island was called Cerna, and modern-day arguments have been advanced that these islands may correspond to Cape Verde due to Phoenician exploration.

The Northwest Africa region emerged as the canonical home of the King via separate sources. In particular, according to Ovid, after Perseus turns Atlas into a mountain range, he flies over Aethiopia, the blood of Medusa's head giving rise to Libyan snakes. By the time of the Roman Empire, the habit of associating Atlas's home to a chain of mountains, the Atlas Mountains, which were near Mauretania and Numidia, was firmly entrenched.

=== Other ===
The identifying name Aril is inscribed on two 5th-century BC Etruscan bronze items: a mirror from Vulci and a ring from an unknown site. Both objects depict the encounter with Atlas of Hercle—the Etruscan Heracles—identified by the inscription; they represent rare instances where a figure from Greek mythology was imported into Etruscan mythology, but the name was not. The Etruscan name Aril is etymologically independent.

== Genealogy ==
Sources describe Atlas as the father, by different goddesses, of numerous children, mostly daughters. Some of these are assigned conflicting or overlapping identities or parentage in different sources.

- By Hesperis:
  - The Hesperides
- By Pleione (or Aethra):
  - The Hyades
  - A son, Hyas
  - The Pleiades
- By one or more unspecified goddesses:
  - Calypso
  - Dione
  - Maera

Hyginus, in his Fabulae, adds an older Atlas who is the son of Aether and Gaia.

== Cultural influence ==
Atlas's best-known cultural association is in cartography. The first publisher to associate the Titan Atlas with a group of maps was the print-seller Antonio Lafreri, who included a depiction of the Titan on the engraved titlepage he applied to his ad hoc assemblages of maps, Tavole Moderne di Geografia de la Maggior parte del Mondo di Diversi Autori (1572). However, Lafreri did not use the word "Atlas" in the title of his work; this was an innovation of Gerardus Mercator, who named his work Atlas Sive Cosmographicae Meditationes de Fabrica Mundi et Fabricati (1585–1595), using the word Atlas as a dedication specifically to honor the Titan Atlas, in his capacity as King of Mauretania, a learned philosopher, mathematician, and astronomer.

In psychology, Atlas is used metaphorically to describe the personality of someone whose childhood was characterized by excessive responsibilities.

Ayn Rand's novel Atlas Shrugged (1957) references the popular misconception of Atlas holding up the entire world on his back by comparing the capitalist and intellectual class as being "modern Atlases" who hold the modern world up at great expense to themselves.

Michael J. Anderson explains that the earliest Greek vase paintings and sculptures depict Atlas with a rigid stance, representing his bearing the burden of Zeus's everlasting punishment. The depiction of Atlas as a muscular figure under the weight of a celestial globe or vault visually express the Greek concept of suffering, resulting from arrogance and rebellion. These artistic patterns explore larger Greek art themes that portray Titans as a symbol of divine punishment and cosmic order.

== Gallery ==
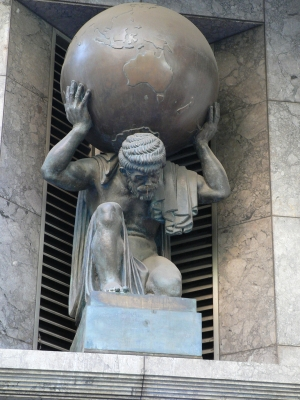
Atlas supports the terrestrial globe on a building in Collins Street, Melbourne, Australia.

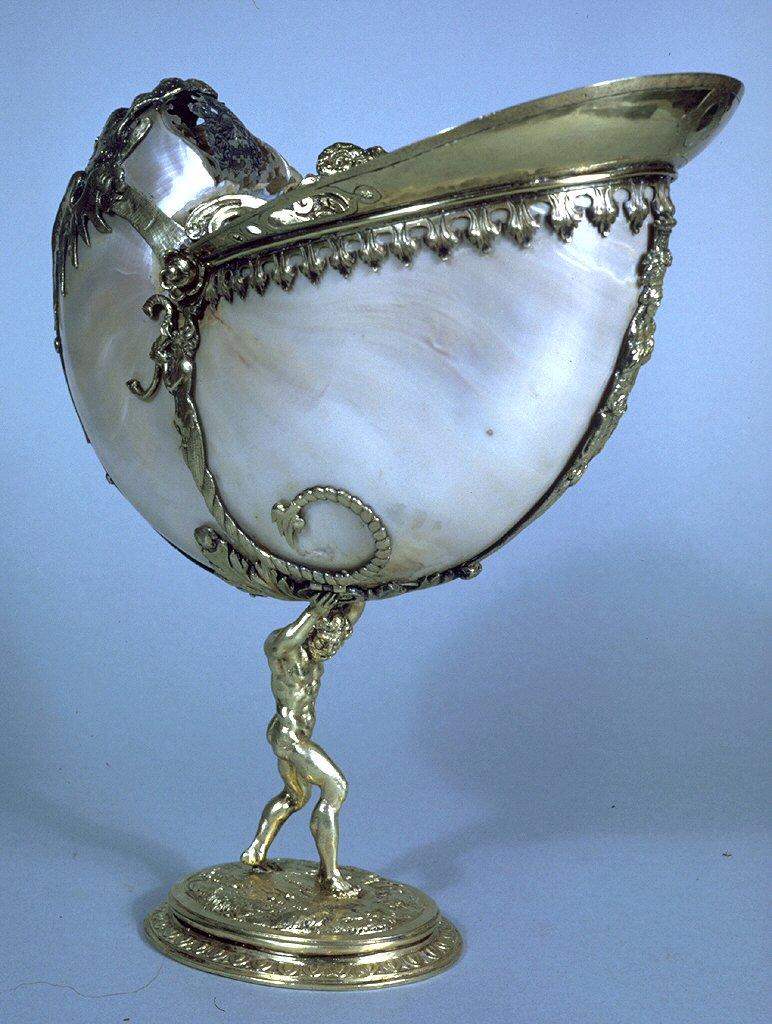
Nautilus Cup. This drinking vessel, for court feasts, depicts Atlas holding the shell on his back. The Walters Art Museum

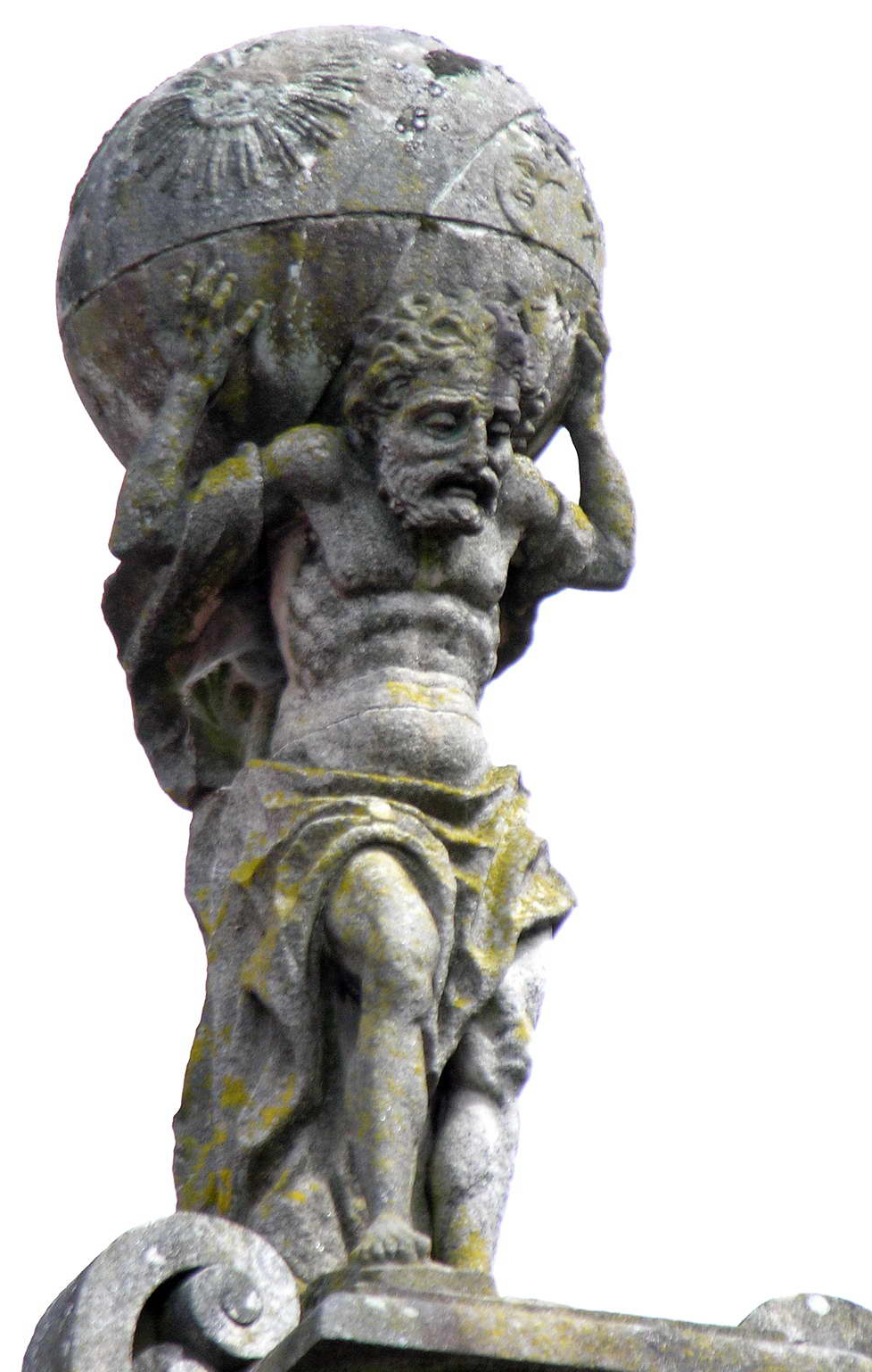
Sculpture of Atlas, Praza do Toural, Santiago de Compostela

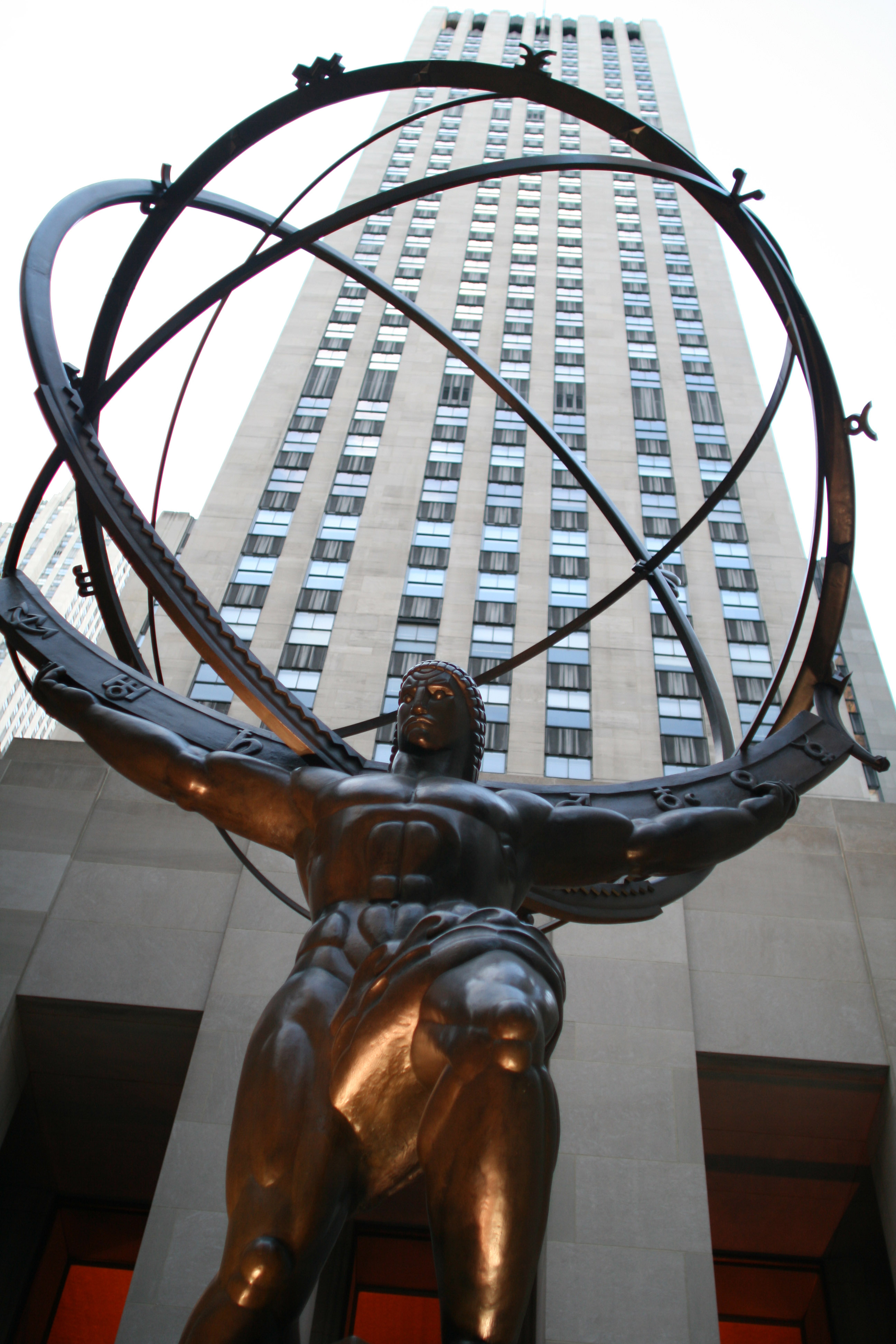
Lee Lawrie's colossal bronze Atlas, Rockefeller Center, New York

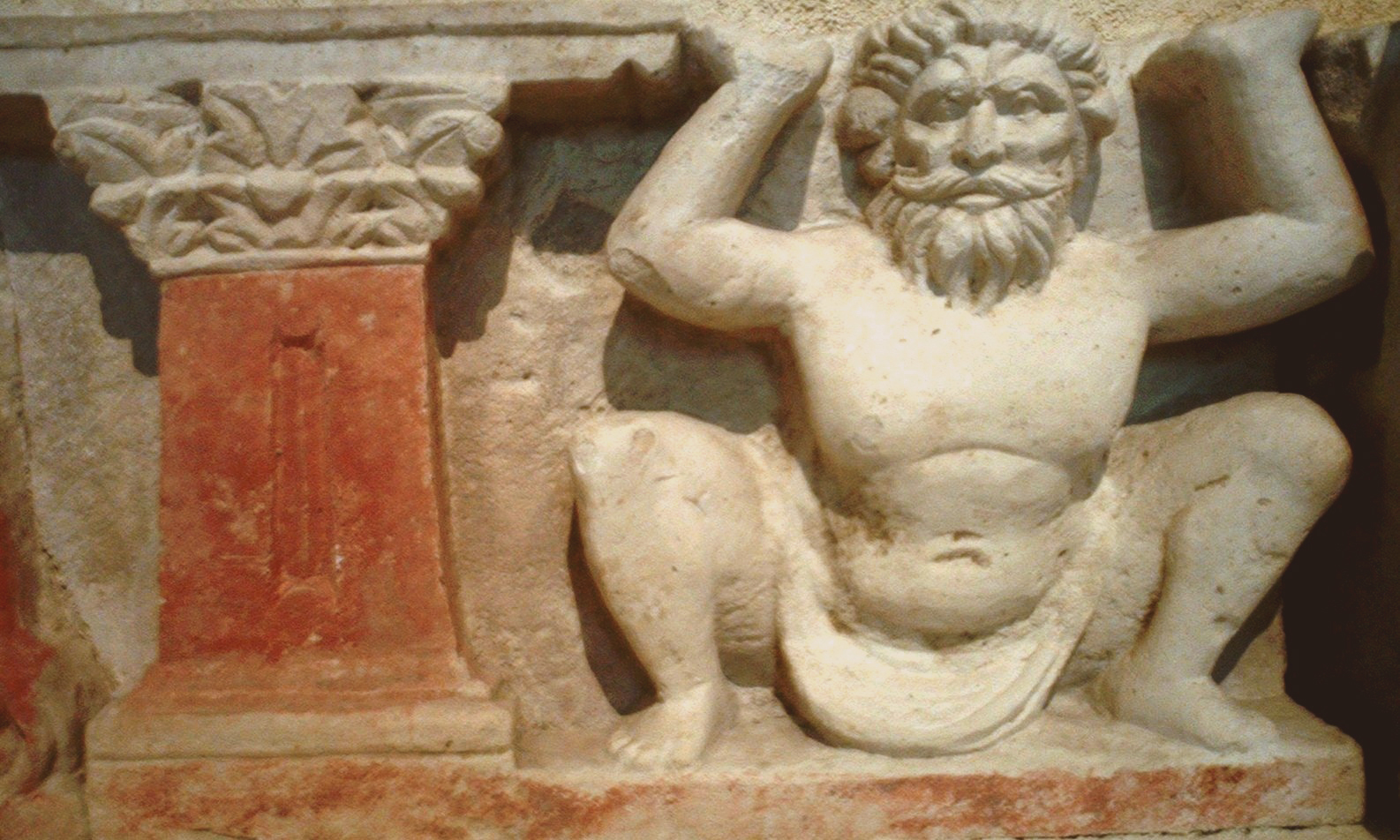
Greco-Buddhist (c. AD 100) Atlas, supporting a Buddhist monument, Hadda, Afghanistan

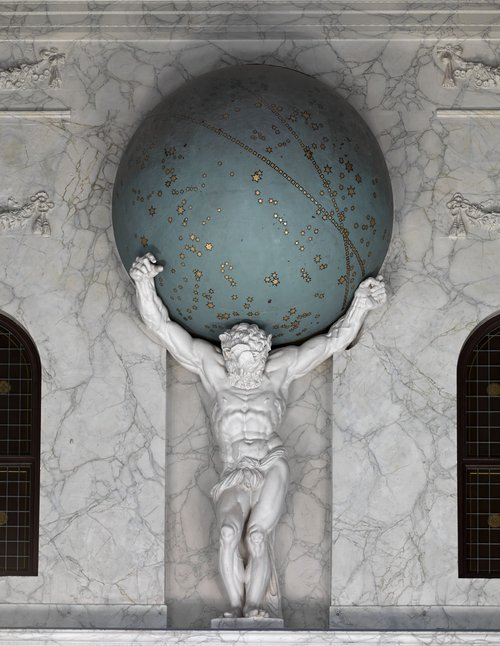
Atlas inside the Royal Palace, Amsterdam, Netherlands

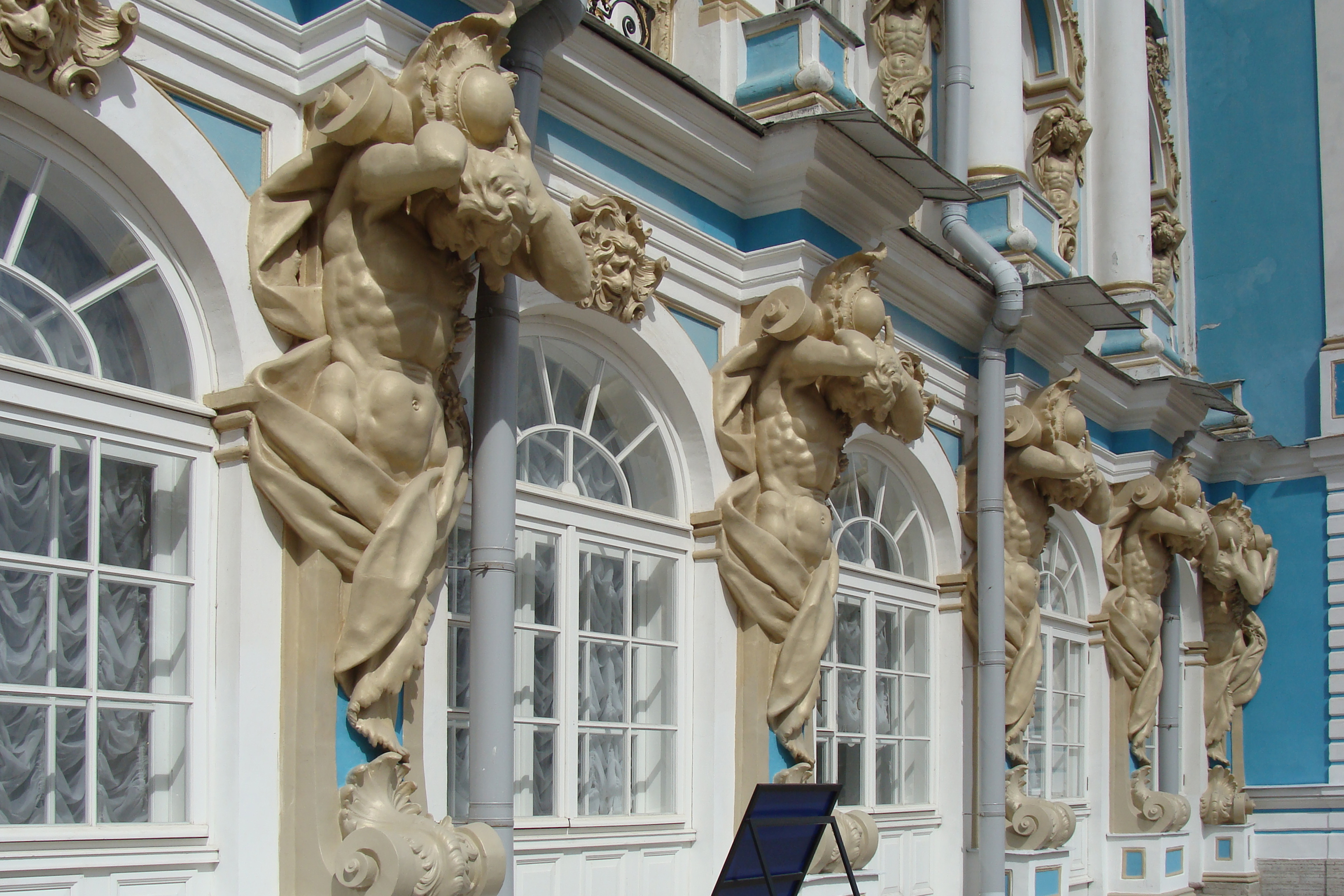
Statues of Atlas on the exterior of Catherine Palace in Tsarskoye Selo, Pushkin, Saint Petersburg

== Family tree ==
Atlas's family tree

Uranus	Gaia	Pontus
Oceanus	Tethys	Hyperion	Theia	Crius	Eurybia
The Rivers	The Oceanids	Helios	Selene	Eos	Astraeus	Pallas	Perses
Cronus	Rhea	Coeus	Phoebe
Hestia	Hera	Hades	Zeus	Leto	Asteria
Demeter	Poseidon
Iapetus	Clymene (or Asia)	Mnemosyne	(Zeus)	Themis
ATLAS	Menoetius	Prometheus	Epimetheus	The Muses	The Horae

== See also ==
- Atlas (architecture)
- Bahamut, a rough analogue from Arabian mythology, and other members of Category:World-bearing animals
- Farnese Atlas
- Upelluri
- Nut (goddess), in ancient Egyptian mythology forced to hold up the sky
