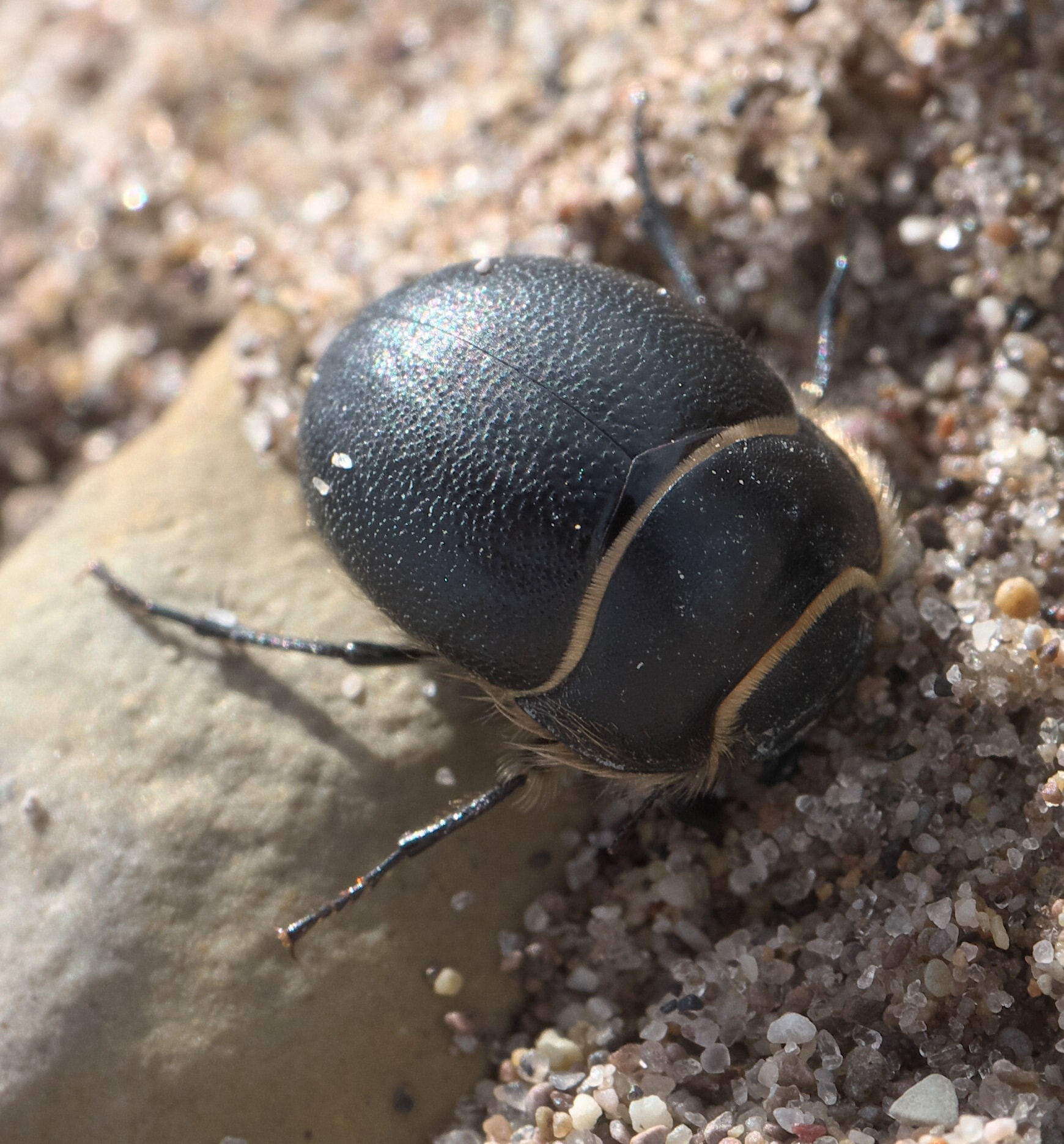
- Eusattus muricatus, Nevada

Scientific classification
- Domain: Eukaryota
- Kingdom: Animalia
- Phylum: Arthropoda
- Class: Insecta
- Order: Coleoptera
- Suborder: Polyphaga
- Infraorder: Cucujiformia
- Family: Tenebrionidae
- Subfamily: Pimeliinae
- Tribe: Coniontini; G.R. Waterhouse, 1858

= Coniontini =

Tribe of darkling beetles

Coniontini is a tribe of darkling beetles in the subfamily Pimeliinae of the family Tenebrionidae. There are at least 4 genera in Coniontini, found in North America.

== Genera ==
These genera belong to the tribe Coniontini

- Coelus Eschscholtz, 1829 (dune beetles)
- Coniontis Eschscholtz, 1829
- Conisattus Casey, 1895
- Eusattus Leconte, 1851
