= Basilea (queen) =

Basilea was the first queen of the legendary Kingdom of Atlantis in ancient Greek folk tradition.

== Legend ==
Basilea was the eldest and one of the most celebrated daughters of Uranus, who had forty-five children by various wives, including Rhea and Pandora. Basilea became known as the “Great Mother” due to the solicitous way in which she cared for her younger brothers. After her father's death, she was elected Queen of Atlantis by popular vote. She married her brother Hyperion and had two children: Selene and Helios, the goddess of the moon and god of the sun, respectively. However, her other brothers murdered Hyperion, for fear that he might usurp the throne, and drowned Helios in the River Eridanus or Po in Italy. Out of love for her brother, Selene committed suicide by jumping from a rooftop. Upon learning of the death of her children, Basilea went mad and “wandered up and down, with hair disheveled and bedizened with ornaments, playing wildly on the timbrel and cymbal.” When the people of Atlantis tried to restrain her, she disappeared into a terrible lightning storm. In honor of Basilea and her children, divine rites were established.

== Identification with Theia ==
Basilea is often confused for Theia, the more accepted mother of Selene, Helios, and in addition, Eos, and wife to Hyperion. It is unsure whether or not they are the same figure.

== Identification with Aphrodite and Venus ==
Basilea is also mentioned quite differently in other versions. She is listed as a daughter of Coelus and Terra, and is implied to be the mother of all gods. It is also implied that she is another version of Aphrodite (Roman, Venus).

== See also ==
- List of Greek deities
