= Coelus gracilis =

Conservation status
- Vulnerable (IUCN 2.3)

Scientific classification
- Kingdom: Animalia
- Phylum: Arthropoda
- Class: Insecta
- Order: Coleoptera
- Suborder: Polyphaga
- Infraorder: Cucujiformia
- Family: Tenebrionidae
- Genus: Coelus
- Species: C. gracilis

Binomial name
- Coelus gracilis Blaisdell, 1939

Species of beetle

Coelus gracilis is a species of beetle in family Tenebrionidae. It is endemic to the United States.
