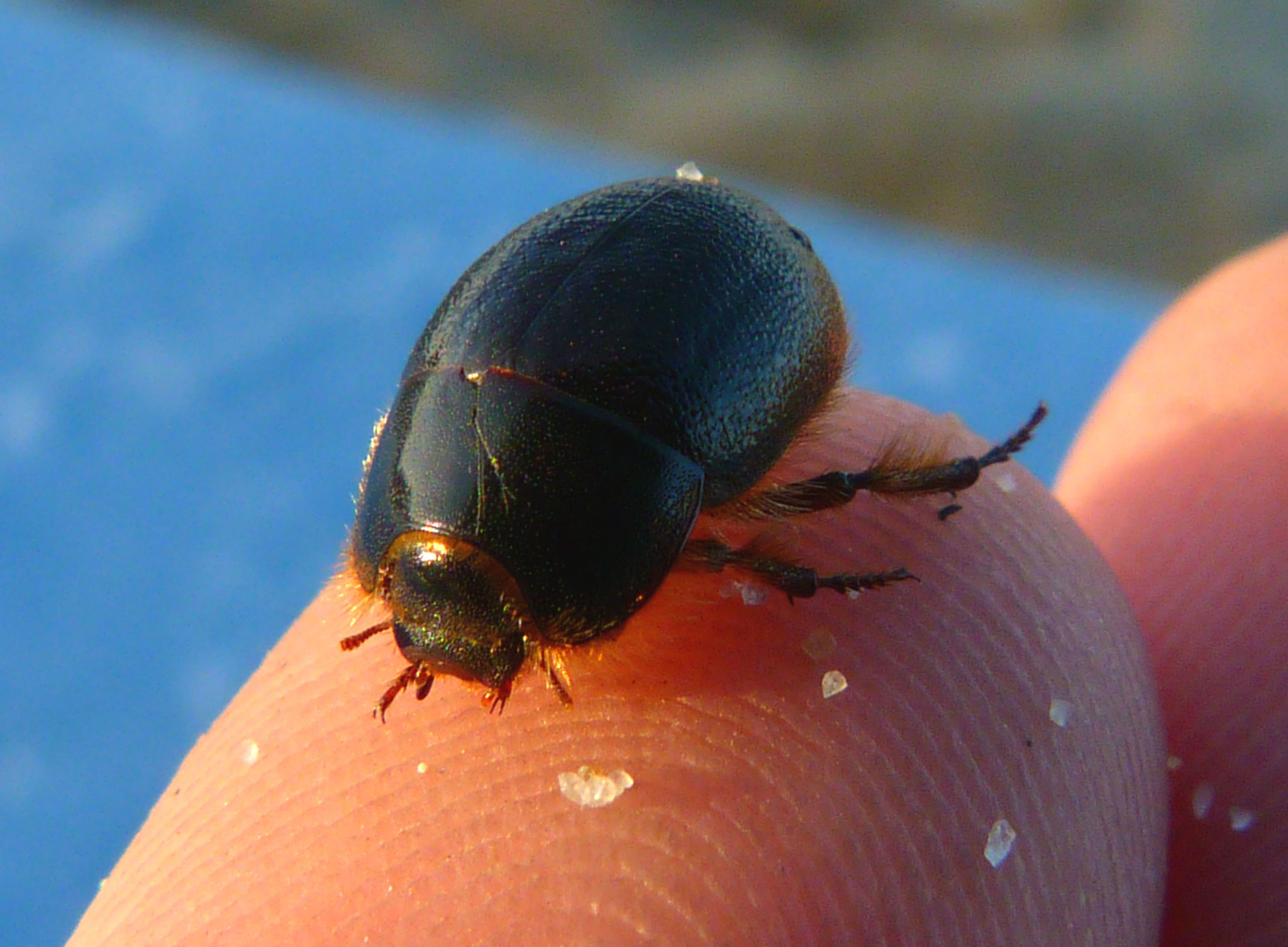

Conservation status
- Vulnerable (IUCN 2.3)

Scientific classification
- Kingdom: Animalia
- Phylum: Arthropoda
- Class: Insecta
- Order: Coleoptera
- Suborder: Polyphaga
- Infraorder: Cucujiformia
- Family: Tenebrionidae
- Genus: Coelus
- Species: C. globosus

Binomial name
- Coelus globosus Leconte, "1851" 1852

= Coelus globosus =

Species of beetle

Coelus globosus is a species of beetle in family Tenebrionidae. It is found in Mexico and the United States.

The Globose Dune Beetle inhabits foredunes and sand hummocks immediately bordering the coast from Bodega Bay Head to Ensenada, Baja California, and all of the Channel Islands except San Clemente Island.
