= Polyidus (poet) =

Polyidus (Ancient Greek: Πολύϊδος, also Πολύειδος or Πολυείδης; fl. c. 400 BC) was an ancient Greek dithyrambic poet who was also skillful as a painter; he seems to have been esteemed almost as highly as Timotheus of Miletus. One of his pupils, Philotas, once defeated Timotheus in competition. According to Plutarch (De Mm. 21, p. 1138, b.), Polyidus outdid Timotheus in those intricate variations, for the introduction of which the musicians of this period are so frequently attacked by contemporaries.

In Poetics 17, Aristotle mentions the example of "Polyidus the Sophist" in bringing the action vividly before the hearer. The example is drawn from the myth of Orestes: "On his coming he was arrested, and about to be sacrificed, when he revealed who he was—either as Euripides puts it, or (as suggested by Polyidus) by the not improbable exclamation, ’So I too am doomed to be sacrificed, as my sister was’".
