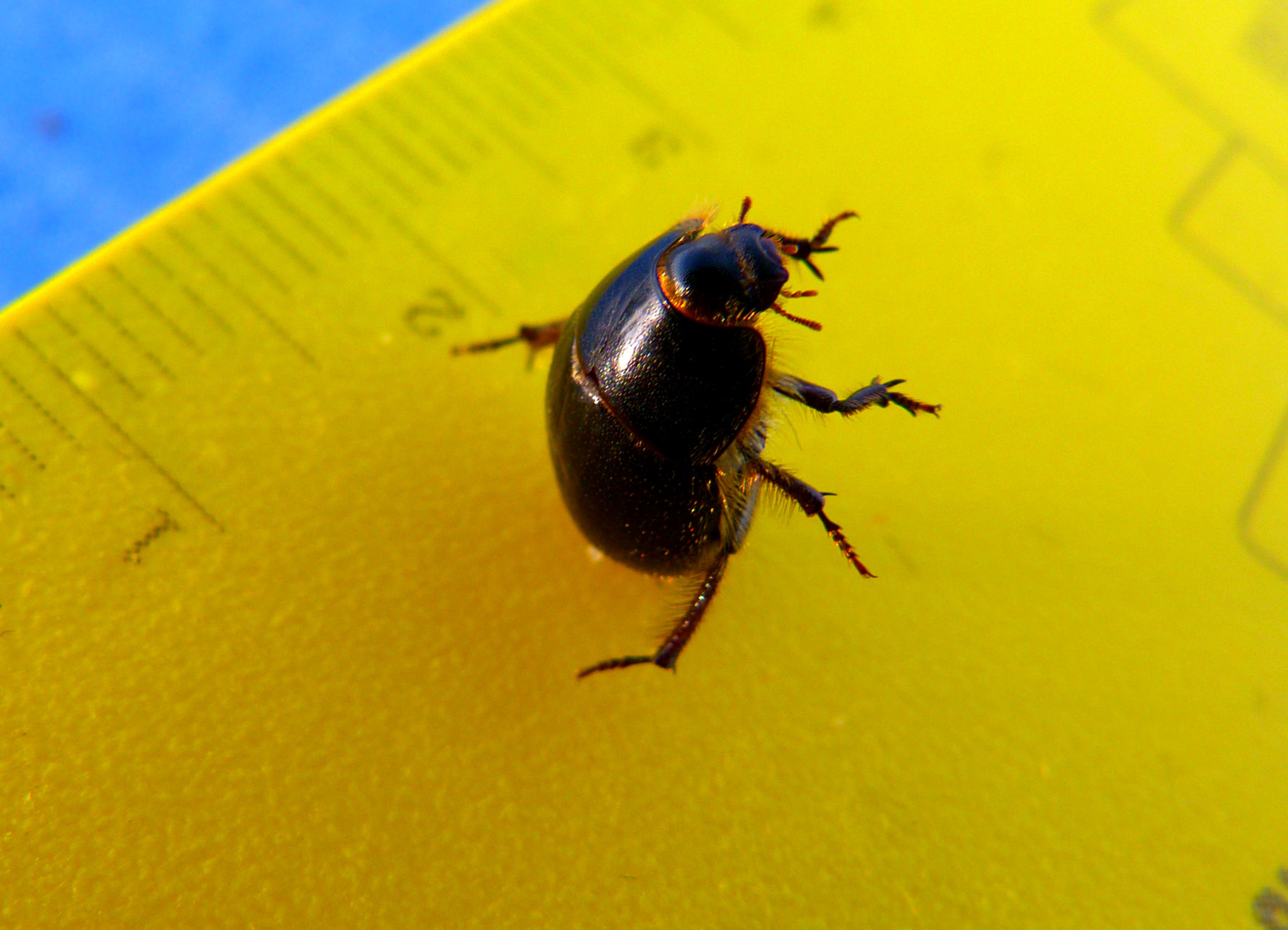
- Coelus globosus

Scientific classification
- Domain: Eukaryota
- Kingdom: Animalia
- Phylum: Arthropoda
- Class: Insecta
- Order: Coleoptera
- Suborder: Polyphaga
- Infraorder: Cucujiformia
- Family: Tenebrionidae
- Tribe: Coniontini
- Genus: Coelus

= Coelus =

Genus of beetles

Coelus is a genus of beetles in the family Tenebrionidae. They live in coastal dunes along the Pacific Coast of North America.

Species include:

- Coelus gracilis
- Coelus globosus
