= Orithyia (Amazon) =

Queen of the Amazons

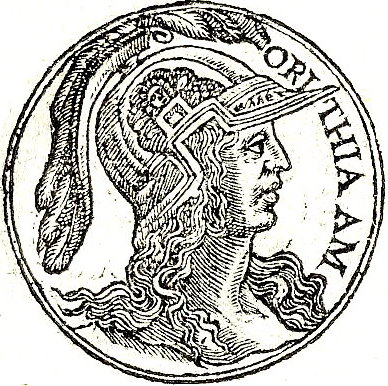
Orithya from Guillaume Rouillé's Promptuarii Iconum Insigniorum

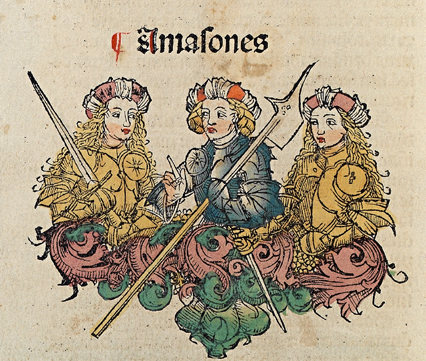
Amazons

In Greek and Roman legendary history, Orithyia was the daughter of Marpesia, and became the queen of the Amazons. She was a key figures in the story of Hercules' quest for the girdle of the Amazon queen, his ninth labor.

== History ==
In Greek and Roman mythology, Orithyia, "woman raging in the mountains", was the daughter of Marpesia. Upon the death of her mother, Orithyia became the new queen of the Amazons. She co-ruled with Antiope, who some authorities say was her sister. She was famous for her perpetual virginity. Her war techniques were outstanding and brought much honor to the Amazon empire.

According to Justinus's Epitome of Trogus Pompeius' History of the World, Orithyia was one of the key figures in the story of Hercules' quest for the girdle of the Amazon queen. In Pompeius Trogus' version of this story, Eurystheus, king of Mycenae, thought it would be nearly impossible to capture Orithyia's royal girdle in war (according to most other versions, the girdle belonged to Hippolyte), so he passed this duty onto Hercules, his debtor, as his ninth labor. Hercules then gathered nine warships and occupied the shores of the Amazons while Orithyia was away. Because of the confusion and the carelessness of the Amazons, their numbers were greatly reduced. Hercules was easily able then to capture Melanippe and Hippolyte, Antiope's sisters. Hercules returned Melanippe after getting the queen's girdle, however Hippolyte was taken away by Theseus, king of Athens, as his share of the spoil. Orithyia then led the Attic War to free Hippolyte and take revenge for the defeat of Antiope. She asked Sagillus, the Scythian king, for assistance, and he sent his son Panasagoras with a body of cavalry to her aid. However, some disagreement occurred between the allies, and the Scythians left the battlefield. The Amazons were eventually defeated, but managed to escape to their allies' camp and, under their protection, returned home safely

In Giovanni Boccaccio's Famous Women, a chapter is dedicated to Orithyia and Antiope.

== See also ==
- Hercules and the Amazon Women
- Penthesilea
- Hippolyta
- Otrera

== Notes ==
Preceded by Otrera	Queen of the Amazons	Succeeded by Penthesilea
