= Arezzo 1465 vase =

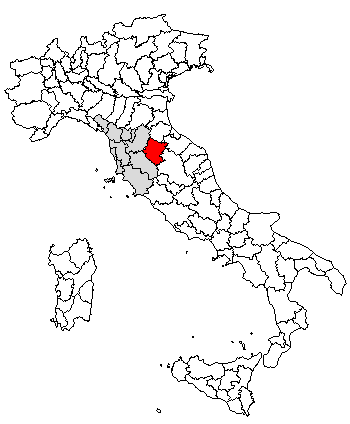
The Arezzo 1465 vase was found in Arezzo, in the Etruria region of Italy.

The Arezzo 1465 vase is an Attic volute krater attributed to Euphronios, that dates to the Late Archaic period (550–510 BCE). It is a red-figure style vase, which became popular during the time of its making, and it was found in Arezzo, Italy in the Etruria region in 1465 due to the vast trade network stemming from Athens. The vase is currently housed in Arezzo, in the Museo Archeologico Nazionale.

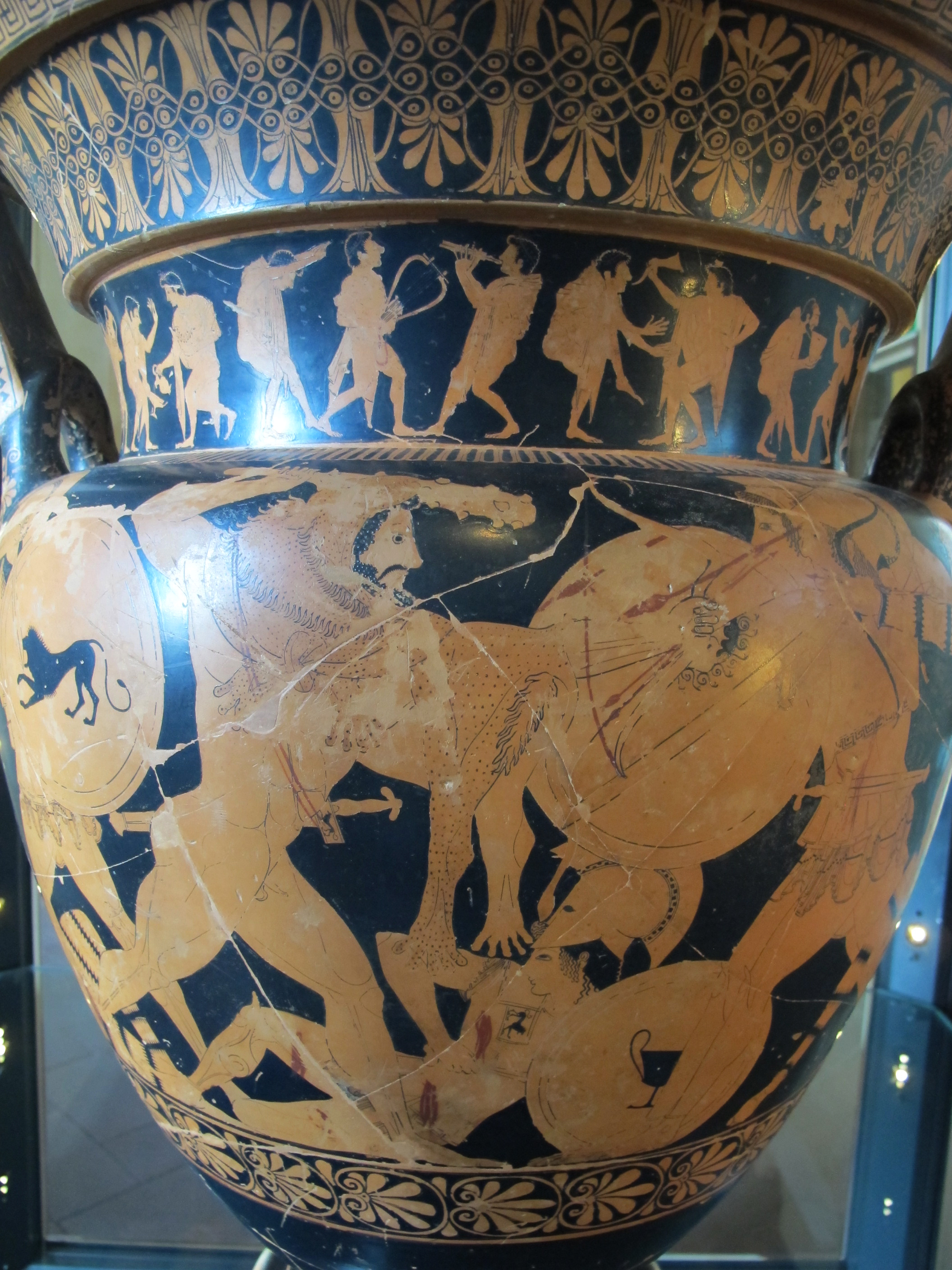
The depictions on one side of the Arezzo 1465 vase include Herakles and Telamon fighting the Amazons.

== Description ==
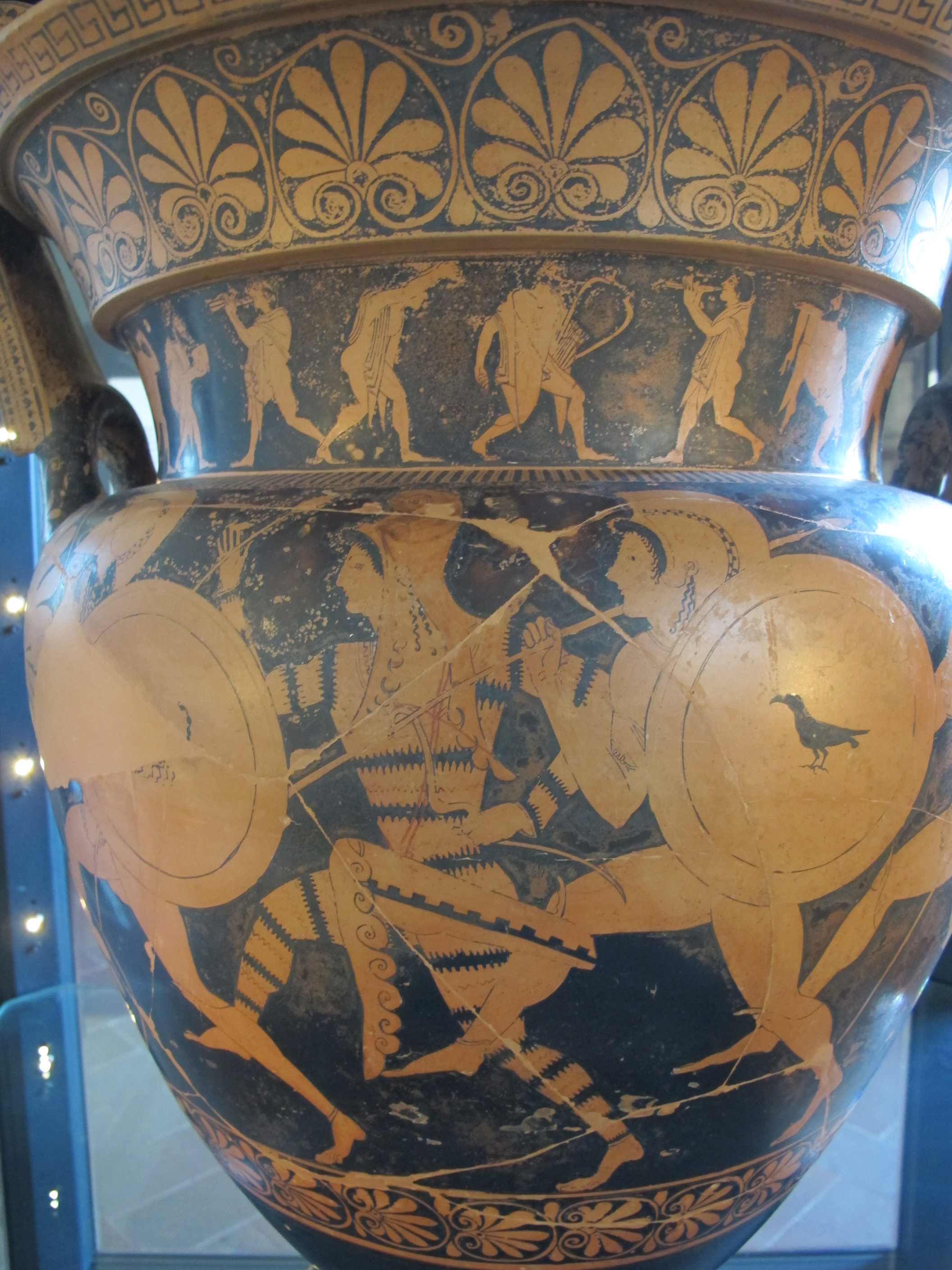
The depictions on the other side of the Arezzo 1465 vase include the Amazons running into battle.

The entire body of the vase primarily focuses on an amazonomachy, which is a battle between the Greeks and the Amazons, a nation of all-female warriors from mythology. One side leads into the other, showing three Greek hoplites and an Amazon seemingly running into battle, shown by their equipment of shields, spears, and helmets. The other side shows Herakles and Telamon battling the Amazons. The frieze on the neck shows a komos, which is a drunken ritual that was performed during Ancient Greek celebrations.

Euphronios chose to include multiple inscriptions on this krater: CHORITHON, KAIKEOS, (kalos/kale) PHILLIADESKALOS, (kalos/kale) XENON KALOS, LYSIS, PHILLIADES, TEISIS, XENON, and XINIS.

Euphronios was a part of the Pioneer Group, and was known to be a major component in the transition from black-figure to red-figure pottery in Ancient Greece. His use of red-figure on this krater allowed him to add an increasing amount of detail to the figures and scenes he depicted, like the textures of Herakles' club and lion skin.

== Depictions ==
All depictions on this vase point towards warfare in Ancient Greece. The body shows an amazonomachy with clear indications of Greek Hoplites, which all carry spears and wear the style of helmet and shield that were historically attributed to Hoplites, as well as hints towards the other warriors being the Amazons, due to their use of a bow rather than spear, the long thin bodies indicative of a more feminine body type, and their different style of clothing. Herakles is known to be a great warrior and hero, so the placement of him among everything else is also indicative of some sort of battle, or of something that he is contributing his efforts in order to reign victorious. Telamon, a friend of the demigod Herakles, is commonly thought of in reference to the myth where Telamon assists Herakles in killing the sea monster that Poseidon sends to destroy the city of Troy, rather than an amazonomachy like this krater depicts, however his presence then further solidifies the warfare theme as he is directly tied to another mythical battle.

Even the komos scene along the neck of the vase is a celebration. Though the direct purpose of a komos is still unclear, they were performed at post-game celebrations for victorious athletes. In Ancient Greece, people regarded warriors as the greatest athletes, with Herakles as the epitome of heroic athletes, so even this contributes to the warfare theme. The komos scene could be celebrating the victory of Herakles over the Amazons in his 9th labor to retrieve the Belt of Hippolyta, the queen of the Amazons, as this is the only mythological reference to any interaction between Herakles and the Amazons. However, as none of the Amazons on this krater are identifiable as Hippolyta and the belt is not on the vase either, it can only be said with certainty that this vase depicts an amazonomachy which involves Herakles.
