= Antiope (Amazon) =

Greek mythological figure, daughter of Ares

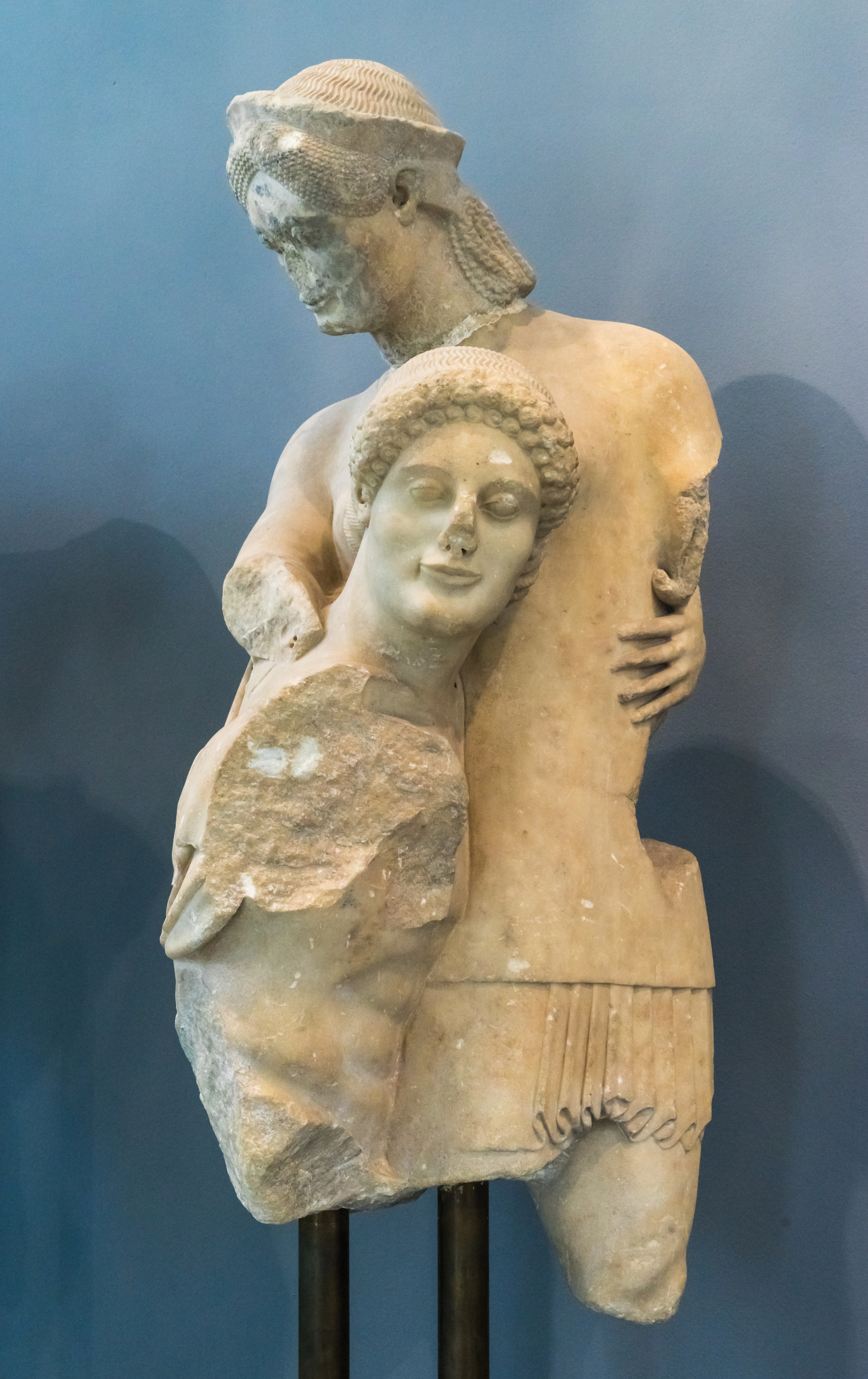
Theseus carries Antiope off, from the pediment of Apollo's temple at Eretria, 500s BC.

In Greek mythology, Antiope (/ænˈtaɪəpi/; Ancient Greek: Ἀντιόπη, romanized: Antiópē, lit. 'derived from αντι anti 'against, compared to, like' and οψ ops 'voice' or 'confronting') was an Amazon, daughter of Ares and sister to Melanippe, Hippolyta, Penthesilea and possibly Orithyia, queens of the Amazons. Two sisters, Orithyia and Antiope, co-ruled the Amazons.

Antiope may have been the wife of Theseus and mother to his son Hippolytus, but differing sources claim this was Hippolyta.

== Mythology ==
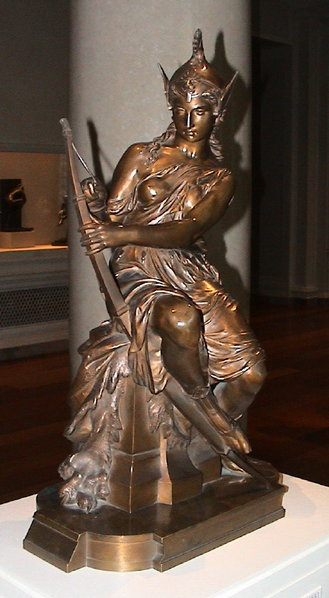
Amazon preparing for a battle, by Pierre-Eugène-Emile Hébert, 1860 (Antiope, Hippolyta or Armed Venus)

There are various accounts of the manner in which Theseus became possessed of Antiope, and of her subsequent fortunes.

In one version, during Heracles' ninth labour, which was to obtain the Girdle of Hippolyta, when he captured the Amazons' capital of Themiscyra, his companion Theseus, king of Athens, abducted Antiope and brought her to his home (or she was captured by Heracles and then given by him to Theseus). According to Pausanias, Antiope fell in love with Theseus and betrayed the Amazons of her own free will. They were eventually married and she gave birth to a son, Hippolytus, who was named after Antiope's sister. Soon after, the Amazons attacked Athens in an attempt to rescue Antiope and to take back Hippolyta's girdle; however, in a battle near the Areopagus, they were defeated by Athenian forces under Theseus's leadership. During this conflict, known as the Attic War, Antiope was accidentally shot dead by an Amazon named Molpadia, who, in turn, was killed by Theseus. The tombs of both Antiope and Molpadia were shown in Athens, according to Pausanias.

According to some sources, the cause for the Amazons' attack on Athens was that Theseus had abandoned Antiope and planned to marry Phaedra. Antiope was furious about this and decided to attack them on their wedding day. She promised to kill every person in attendance; however, she was slain instead by Theseus himself, fulfilling an oracle's prophecy to that effect. Ovid mentions that Theseus killed Antiope despite the fact that she was pregnant.

An alternative version of the myth relates all the facts concerning Antiope (abduction by Theseus, their marriage, birth of Hippolytus, her being left behind in favour of Phaedra), not of her but of Hippolyte. In various accounts of this version, the subsequent attack on Athens either does not occur at all or is led by Orithyia.

In one tale, while on board the ship that carried her to Athens, Antiope caught the eye of one of the crewmates, Solois. Although she rejected his advances respectfully and said nothing to Theseus, the desperate Solois jumped into a river in Bithynia and drowned.

== Cultural depictions ==
- The 1973 Italian film War Goddess depicts the story of Antiope and Theseus.
- Evangeline Walton's 1983 historical fiction novel The Sword Is Forged chronicles the story of Antiope and Theseus.
- Steven Pressfield's 2004 historical fiction novel the Last of the Amazons tells the story of the end of the Amazons where Antiope elopes with Theseus.
- The DC Comics character Antiope, introduced in 1984, is the aunt of Wonder Woman and sister of Queen Hippolyta of the Amazons. She is portrayed by Robin Wright in the 2017 film Wonder Woman.
- In Giovanni Boccaccio's Famous Women, a chapter is dedicated to Antiope and Orithyia.

== See also ==
- Attic War
- Hercules and the Amazon Women
- Otrera
- Penthesilea

== Sources ==
- Watson, John Selby. Justin, Cornelius Nepos, and Eutropius: Literally Translated, pp. 21–22, 547; Published 1853 H. G. Bohn, (Original in the New York Public Library).
- Williams, Henry Smith. The Historians' History of the World: A Comprehensive Narrative of the Rise, v.2, pp. 440–441; Published 1904 The Outlook Company, New York Public Library.
- Justinus. Epitoma Historiarum philippicarum Pompei Trogi, II.4.17-30.
- Orosius. Historiae adversus paganos, I.15.7-9.
- Plutarch, Life of Theseus in Plutarch's Lives, with an English Translation by Bernadotte Perrin. Cambridge, MA. Harvard University Press. London. William Heinemann Ltd. 1914. 1. Available online at Perseus Digital Library.

| Preceded by Otrera | Queen of the Amazons | Succeeded by Penthesilea |
