= Attic War =

Amazon–Athenian war in Greek mythology

In Greek mythology, the Attic War was the conflict between the Amazons, a race of women warriors led by the Amazon queen Penthesilea, and the Athenians, led by Theseus or Heracles. The war lasted 4 months and concluded with a peace treaty in Horeomosium, near the temple of Theseus.

Depending on the version of the myth, the Amazons fought to free either Antiope or her sister Hippolyta from captivity after her abduction at the hands of a Greek hero, or to simply fight against Troy. Another version states Antiope waged war on Theseus to avenge him marrying Phaedra.

In some myths, Hippolyta was killed during the ninth labor when Heracles attempted to obtain her girdle peacefully until the Amazons attacked him, and Theseus, who had joined Hercules during his expedition, abducted Hippolyta's sister Antiope, who was an Amazon that Theseus married in a separate myth.

== Siege of Athens ==
Plutarch states that the Amazons had most likely conquered most of the Athenian state, for having reached the Pnyx and the Museum of Athens (Museum here refers to a building or temple dedicated to Muses). Hellanicus relates that they crossed the Cimmerian Bosphorus when it was frozen; which Plutarch does not find plausible, and states that the portion of the city where the Amazons had camped bear many Amazonian hallmarks, names and graves. Once the Amazons set siege on Athens, both sides remained disengaged for a period of time. Theseus then sacrificed to Phobos and attacked the Amazonian camp during the Athenian month of Boedromion. Kleidemus writes that the left wing of the Amazon army stood in a place in Athens that came to be known later as the "Amazoneum", and the right flank reached to the Pnyx. The Athenians attacked from the Museum towards the Amazonian right wing, situated on the Pnyx, Plutarch states that the tombs of the fallen from this battle could be seen then along this area. The Athenian attack was repulsed by the Amazonians on this side, and the Amazonians counterattacked and pushed the Athenians as far back as the temple of Eumenides. On the other wing, where the Athenians attacked from the temples of Pallas and Ardettus and the Lyceum drove back the Amazonian left to their camp.

Many versions of the myth exist, one myth states that Antiope was slain while fighting with the side of Theseus when a javelin thrown by an Amazon named Molpadia hit her, in another version of the Myth Antiope led the Amazons in battle against the Athenians and was wounded in the fighting, upon which Molpadia killed the wounded queen to save her from being captured by the Athenians, another version where Antiope is the wife of Theseus relates that Antiope helped secretly transport wounded Amazons for treatment on the island of Chalkis that was located somewhere in the Black Sea, where some of them were buried in a place that later became known as the Amazoneum. A peace treaty was concluded on the 4th month of the war in the Horeomosium (near the temple of Theseus). The Athenians agreed to make sacrifices to the Amazons before each festival of Theseus. Plutarch writes that more Amazon graves were near Chaeronea (by the stream of Haemon, anciently known as Thermodon) and more burial places across Thessaly (Skotussa and Cynoscephalae) suggest that the Amazons had to fight more battles with other Greeks on their way back to their homeland. Plutarch also visited burial places of Amazons at Megara, where he mentions a lozenge-shaped Amazon crypt is located.

== See also ==
- Amazonomachy
