= Otrera =

Queen of the Amazons in Greek mythology

In Greek mythology, Otrera /oʊˈtrɪərə/ (Ancient Greek: Ὀτρήρη, romanized: Otrērē, lit. 'the one encouraging others' or 'swift') was the founder and first Queen of the Amazons; the consort of Ares and mother of Hippolyta and Penthesilea. She is credited with being the founder of the shrine of Artemis in Ephesus.

== Mythology ==
=== Queen of the Amazons ===
Apollonius of Rhodes writes that the three cities of the Amazons are located in the plain of Doias. He further mentions a temple of Ares, Otrera and Antiope built in a desert island full of ravening birds. Otrera is sometimes considered the mythological founder of the Temple of Artemis in Ephesus, which was closely connected with Amazons. She is the queen and the founding mother of the Amazon nation.

Otrera was the consort of Ares and mother by him of Hippolyta and Penthesilea; both went on to become queens of the Amazons. While usually said to be Ares' consort, in one version she's his daughter instead by an unknown mother.

=== Otrera and the Temple of Artemis ===
The war-like Amazons were credited with founding the Temple of Artemis at Ephesus. They established an image beneath an oak tree, with one of them, Hippolyta, performing the ritual in honour of the goddess, and around the image they broke into a war dance, holding their spears and armor. No one was to refuse the yearly dance, as Hippolyta apparently did and was punished for that.

Pausanias writes that, Pindar also followed the tradition in which the cult of Artemis in Ephesus was established by Otrera and the Amazons. According to Pindar, the sanctuary was founded by the Amazons during their campaign against Athens and Theseus, and that it was common for the women from Thermodon to sacrifice there on that occasion as well as other, such as when they fled from Heracles and earlier still from Dionysus. However, Pausanias notes that the cult of Artemis is much more ancient, and that it wasn't the Amazons, but a native named Coresus who founded the temple.

=== Possible adventures ===
While she's not confirmed by name in taking part in any of those events, it is recorded that once the Amazons took part in a campaign against Troy, and that the hero Bellerophon also led a war against them, in which he emerged victorious.

== Notes ==
Vacant	Queen of the Amazons	Succeeded by Hippolyta
