= Amazonomachy =

Mythological battles between the ancient Greeks and the Amazons

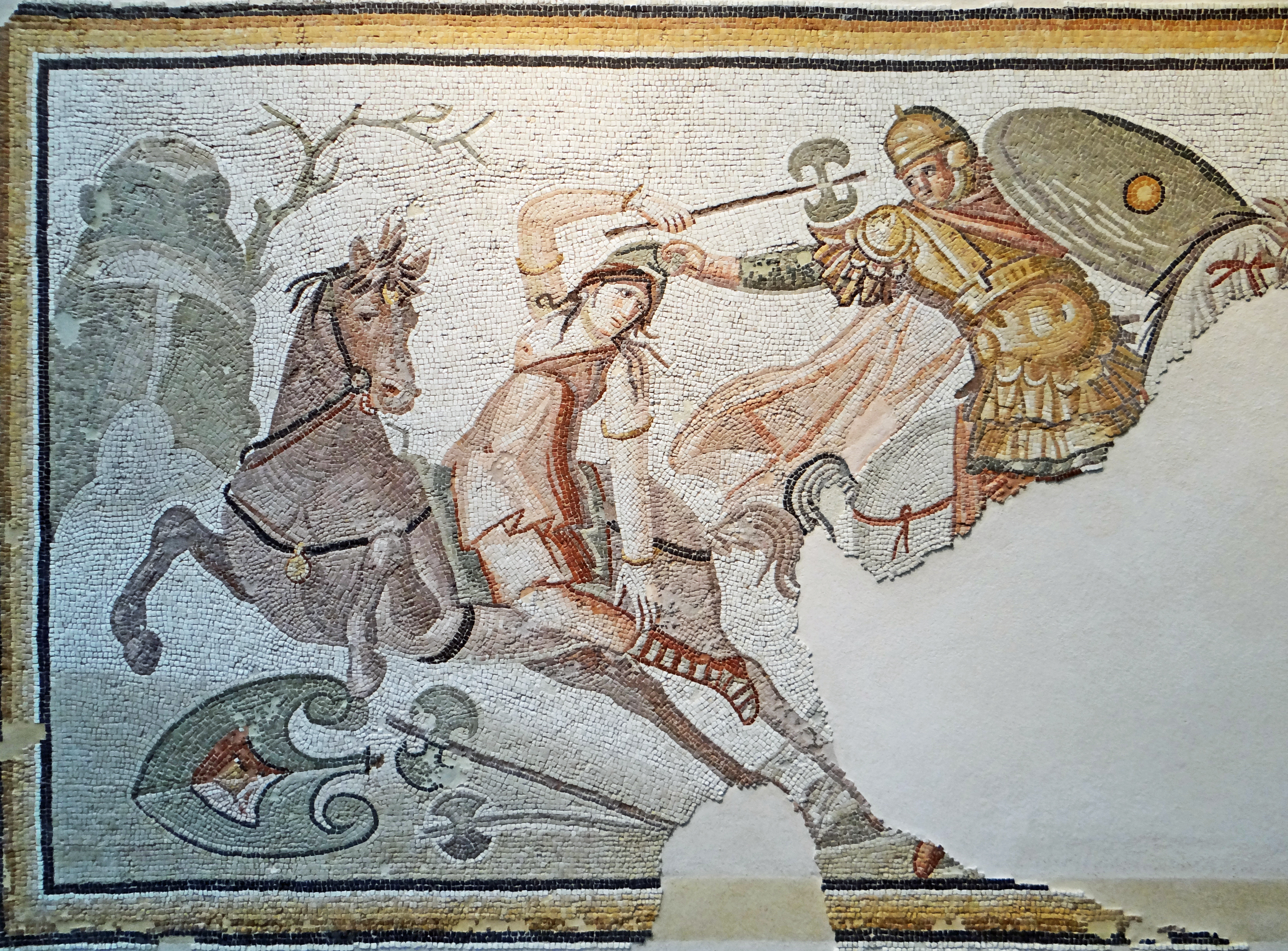
4th century AD Amazonomachy mosaic from Daphne, a suburb of Antioch on the Orontes (modern Antakya, Turkey); Louvre, Denon Wing

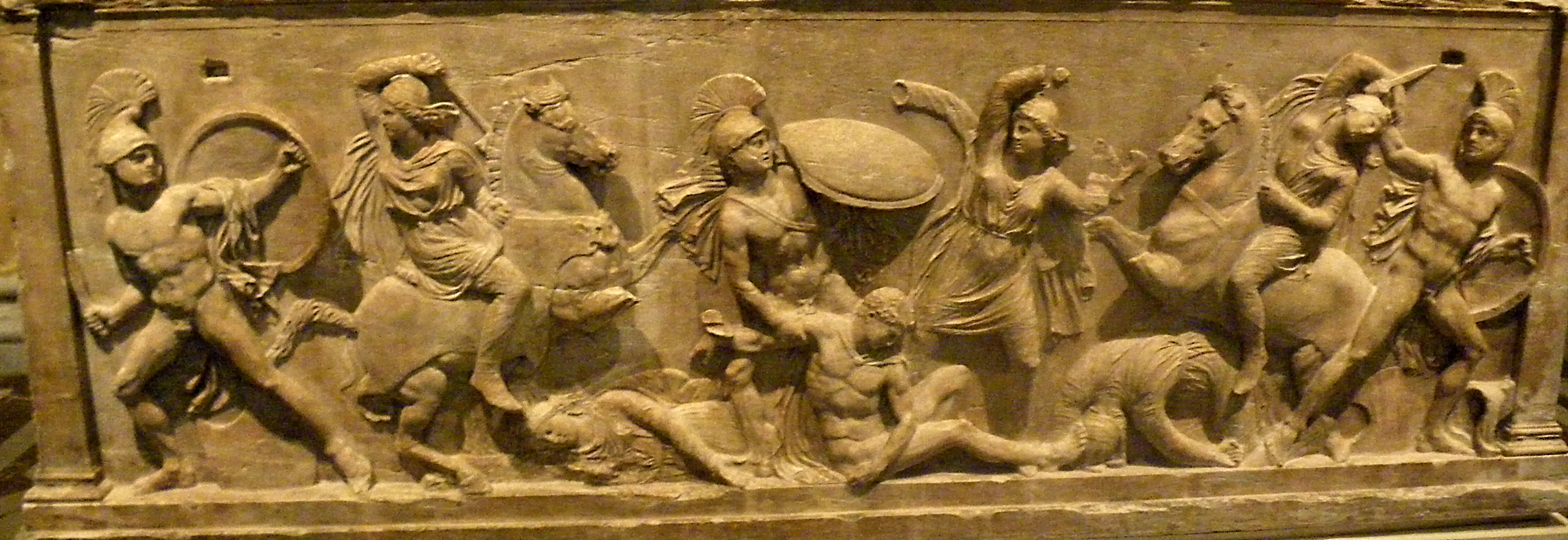
Relief now in Vienna

In Greek mythology, an Amazonomachy (English translation: "Amazon battle"; plural, Amazonomachiai (Ancient Greek: Ἀμαζονομαχίαι) or Amazonomachies) is a mythological battle between the ancient Greeks and the Amazons, a nation of all-female warriors. The subject of Amazonomachies was popular in ancient Greek art and Roman art.

== Amazonomachy in Myth ==
Throughout all of antiquity, the Amazons were regarded as a race of female warriors descended from Ares, fiercely independent and skilled in hunting, riding, archery, and warfare. They worshiped Ares and Artemis, respectively the god of war and the goddess of the hunt, and their geographic locations were notably associated with Scythia and the Asia Minor.

In Greek epic narratives, the Amazons were perceived to be non-Greek heroic figures who challenged the strength and masculinity of Greek heroes on the battlefield, such as Achilles, Bellerophon, Heracles (Hercules), Theseus, and the Athenians.

=== Trojan War, Achilles ===
In the lost Greek epic Aethiopis, which was published in the 8th century BCE and is widely attributed to Arctinus of Miletus, Achilles fights and kills Penthesilea, the queen of the Amazons who came to aid Troy after the death of Hector. The oral myths and retellings of this epic fall of Troy referencing the Amazons contributed to Homer's Iliad and Odyssey.

=== Ninth Labor, Hercules ===
During Hercules’ ninth labor, Hercules was given the task by Eurystheus to retrieve the royal girdle of the Amazon queen Hippolyta for his daughter. Though Hercules and the Amazons were originally open for peaceful negotiation, the malicious machinations of Hera incited a misunderstanding between the Amazons and Hercules, leading to a bloody battle in which the Amazons were ultimately defeated.

=== Attic War, Theseus ===
In some versions of the myth, Theseus had accompanied Hercules on his ninth labor and either eloped with or abducted Antiope, Hippolyta's sister (or Hippolyta herself). Antiope was then taken to Athens by Theseus, whom she married and bore a son, Hippolytus. As a result of the kidnapping, the Amazons invaded Greece, inciting the legendary Attic War between the Amazons and Athenians, which ended in the Amazons’ defeat.

== Symbolism of Amazonomachy ==
Amazonomachy represents the Greek ideal of civilization. The Amazons were portrayed as a savage and barbaric race, while the Greeks were portrayed as a civilized race of human progress. According to Bruno Snell's view of Amazonomachy:

For the Greeks, the Titanomachy and the battle against the giants remained symbols of the victory which their own world had won over a strange universe; along with the battles against the Amazons and Centaurs they continue to signalize the Greek conquest of everything barbarous, of all monstrosity and grossness.

In Quintus Smyrnaeus's The Fall of Troy, Penthesilea, an Amazonian queen, who joined on the side of the Trojans during the Trojan war, was quoted at Troy, saying:

Not in strength are we inferior to men; the same our eyes, our limbs the same; one common light we see, one air we breathe; nor different is the food we eat. What then denied to us hath heaven on man bestowed?

According to Josine Blok, Amazonomachy provides two different contexts for defining a Greek hero. Either the Amazons are one of the disasters from which the hero rids the country after his victory over a monster, or they are an expression of the underlying Attis motif in which the hero shuns human sexuality in marriage and procreation.

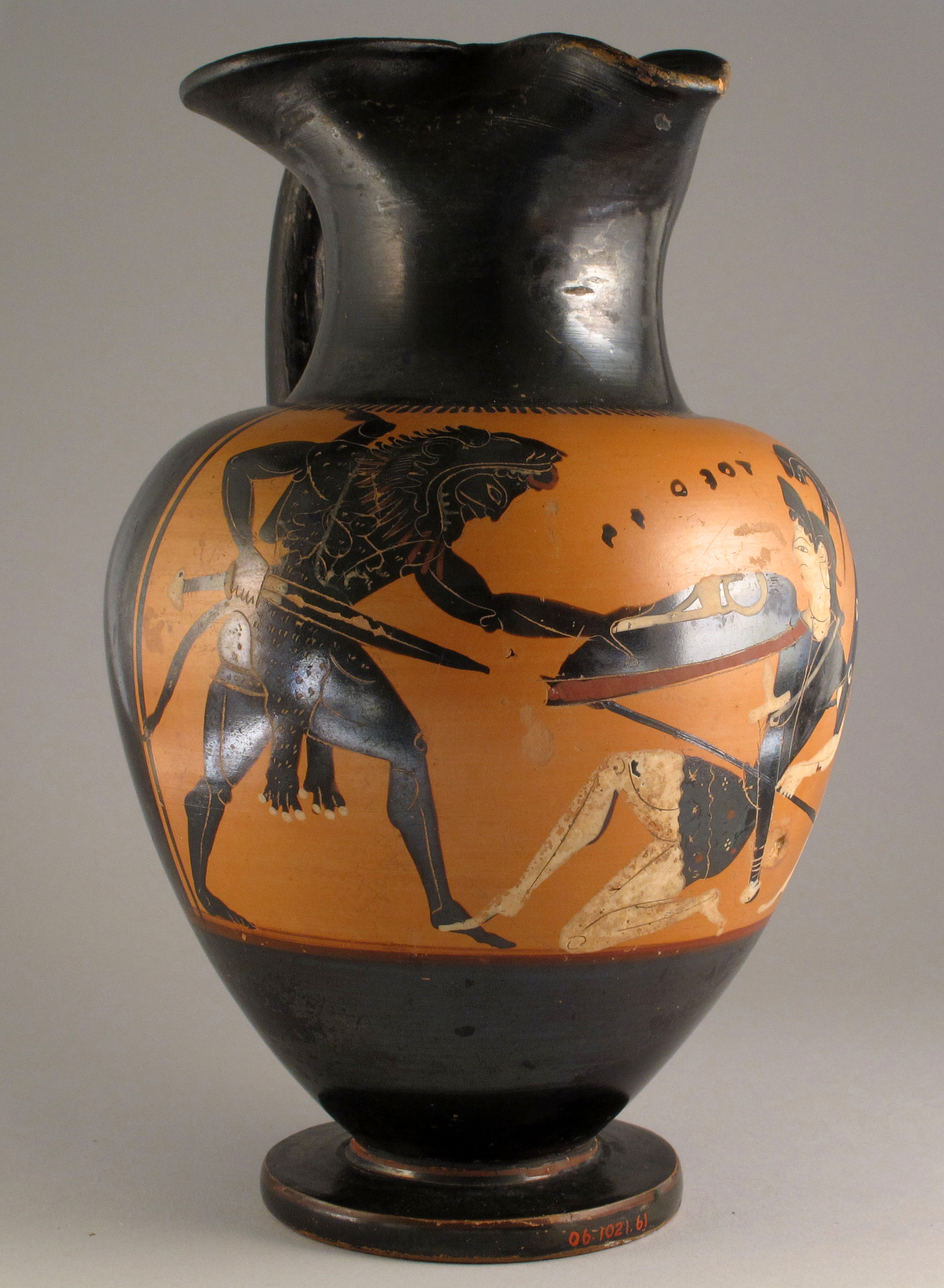
Heracles in the battle against an Amazon, 6th century BC

J.J. Bachofen understood Amazonian myths as remnants of a prehistoric matriarchy. In other words, as popularized in the 21st century, matriarchy was conceptualized by him through the phrase "Mother Right". He theorized that the Amazons were not merely mythical creatures but were derived from the historical manifestation of a time when women held immense power in society. In his view, society initially revolved around female dominance, which was reflected in the Greeks' engagement with Amazonian motifs in art. However, he believed society transitioned to patriarchy at the dawn of civilization, seeing male domination as necessary for progress.

Bachofen’s thesis was highly influential, and it was incorporated into several schools of thought, including Freudians, Structuralists, and Feminists. At the end of the 19th century, American psychologists interested in Amazonomachy integrated Bachofen’s matriarchy ideals with Sigmund Freud’s psychoanalytic framework. Schultz Engle argues that Amazon warriors were often depicted riding horses as a response to the incompetence of Scythian males. She theorized that Scythian men were weakened due to orchitis, a condition causing inflammation of the testicles, which she attributed to spending long hours on horseback. Using Amazonomachy as a sexual and psychological allegory, she then posits that the Amazons, in contrast, derived masturbatory pleasure from riding horses.

Feminists like Page DuBois understood Amazonomachy and its myths as symbols of the feminist struggle against patriarchy. He posits that Amazonian matriarchy was conceptualized as a tool to counter masculine tyranny.

Structuralists also expanded on Bachofen’s argument about matriarchy, asserting that the Amazons represented the opposite of the Greek polis, in which male domination shaped society into a "men’s club". This binary approach argued that marriage was for women, while war was for men. Later, scholars would apply a binary framework to analyze Amazonomachy and its myths, conceptualizing oppositions such as "barbarians" vs. "civilization" and "masculinity" vs. "femininity".

Critics have challenged the interpretation of Amazonomachy as a symbolic critique of Athenian patriarchy and male anxieties. Mary Lefkowitz pointed out the existence of Amazonomachy in myths predating the strict sex segregation of Athens, so she rejects the notion that the Amazons should be interpreted as a response to gender norms. In addition, in any battles the Greeks may have had against the Amazons, both men and women would suffer during the conflicts, which contradicts the idea that Amazonomachy functioned solely as a tool against Athenian patriarchy. She also compared the Greeks' battle against the Amazons to their battle against the Centaurs to further highlight the logical flaws in feminist arguments. If, as feminists argue, Amazonomachy symbolizes the suppression of women, then by the same line of logic, Centauromachy should also symbolize the suppression of horses. However, horses were highly valued and respected in ancient Greece. She highlights that the feminist framework in understanding Amazonomachy interprets it outside its historical and cultural meaning, instead reframing it to suit their own agenda .

Historiography in response to such criticism has shifted the focus towards understanding Amazonomachy as a symbol of ‘otherness'. Andrew Stewart understood it as a complex notion of the other symbolically that the Persians held in reality. As evident, in the 5th century BC, the Achaemenid Empire began a series of invasions against Greece. Because of this, some scholars believe that in most Greek art of that time, Persians were shown allegorically through the figure of centaurs and Amazons.

Literature such as Lysias' Epitaphios and Isocrates' Panegyrikos further strengthen this parallel to the defeat of the Persians, as their versions of the Attic War similarly climax with the total annihilation of the invading forces.

Stewart asserts that the Amazons served as a metaphor for the Persians, allowing the Greeks to present themselves as superior to the "barbarians". His argument draws from the characteristics of the Amazons as parthenoi, who were unwed females with no sexual experience. Unlike the contemporary concept of virginity, the social construct in Ancient Greece referred to their state of femininity as unripe and unfinished. The body of a parthenoi was also more athletic, resembling that of a boy rather than a woman. They could not fully embody the feminine ideals of softness and permeability, yet they were not entirely masculine, lacking sharply defined features associated with hardness and muscles. Hence, the characteristics of parthenoi, wild, untamed, undomesticated, and unrestrained, challenged the norms of the Athenian confined society and traditional expectations of women. He posits that daughters like parthenoi threatened family stability and the authority of the father, which served as an extended metaphor for society as a whole. He rejects Bachofen’s thesis of matriarchy and instead proposes that Amazonomachy represents a broader threat to Athenian societal order, symbolizing "otherness" in the context of the Persian invasions.

After the Graeco-Persian War, there was a rise in Amazonomachies in Athenian art, including a doubling of Amazon scenes on vases around 450 BCE. The Parthenon (447–432 BCE), a monument celebrating Athens’ victory over Persia, also featured two depictions of Amazonomachy—one on the west metopes and the other on the shield of Pheidias’ statue of Athena within the temple. Stewart also argues that the rise in Amazonomachy in art was connected to Perikles, the leading Athenian statesman, and his Citizenship Law of 451 BCE. This law defined Athenian identity by restricting citizenship to individuals with two Athenian parents. It was likely a response to the influx of immigrants who settled in Athens after the Graeco-Persian War, making up as much as one-fifth of the population. Amazons were non-Greek women associated with Asia Minor, who fought like men, and were also enemies of the Greeks. Thus, the increase in Amazonomachy to further reinforce the concept of the "other" against the Greeks could reflect Perikles' and the broader Greek society's anxiety over citizenship.

According to Jeremy McInerney, Kleidemos' account of the Attic War was politically connoted in such a way that Theseus' defeat of the Persians not only represented the victory of Athens as a whole, but also reaffirmed certain values of Athenian democracy, likely during a period of political and historical tension in the 4th century BC.

Modern interpretations also view the amazonomachy as largely symbolic of the conflict between the ancient Greek patriarchal model of civilization against (the influence of) the foreign, gender-transgressive female. The various amazonomachiai in Greek myths were typically concluded with the triumph of some Athenian male hero (such as Hercules or Theseus) over famous Amazons, who were killed in combat or sexually subjugated by Greek men. According to these modern scholars, the male hero's quintessential defeat of the Amazons in mythology (as well as Amazon grave markers) reinforced and reminded the Greek populace of the supremacy of Athens' patriarchal model of civilization and society.

== Amazonomachy in Art ==
Warfare was a very popular subject in Ancient Greek art, represented in grand sculptural scenes on temples but also countless Greek vases. Along with scenes from Homer and the Gigantomachy, the Amazonomachy was a popular choice, depicting battles between Greek men and female foreigners. Later, in Roman art, there are many depictions on the sides of later Roman sarcophagi, when it became the fashion to depict elaborate reliefs of battle scenes. Scenes were also shown on mosaics. A trickle of medieval depictions increased at the Renaissance, and especially in the Baroque period.

=== Early Greek Shields ===
Early Greek art typically depicted Amazons in battle, frequently shown riding horses or wielding weapons such as bows and arrows, swords, spears, and shields. Based on existing evidence, the first indications of these female warriors entering art was in votary shields and shield decorations, with the earliest example being on a clay shield from Tiryns from around 700 B.C.

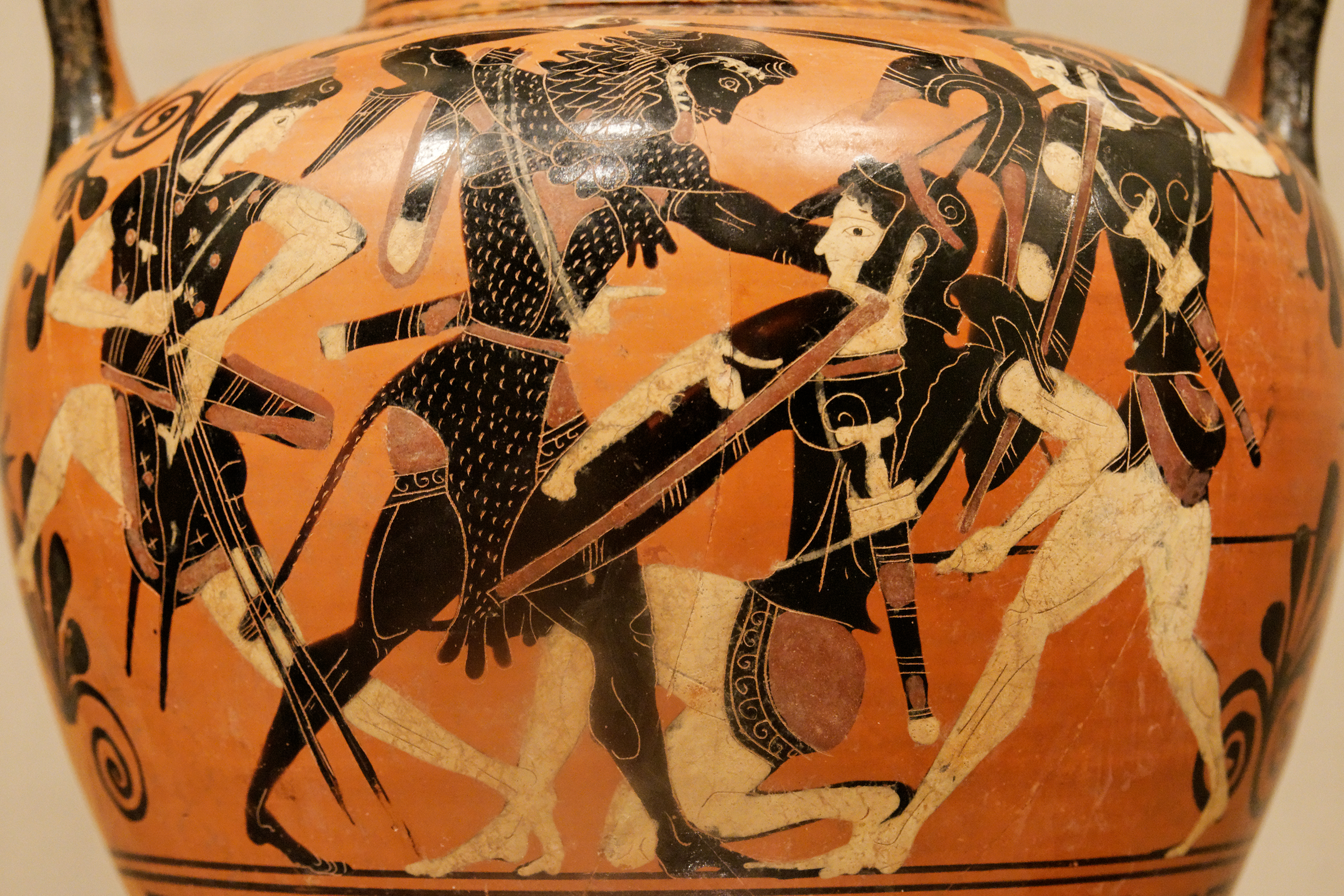
Herakles fighting the Amazons, side A from an Attic black-figure neck amphora.

=== Ancient Greek Pottery ===
Amazons began to be featured prominently on Attic vases from around 570 BCE onward until the middle of the 5th Century. During the beginning of this time period, Amazons were most popularly depicted on Attic black-figure pottery, depicting Amazon battle scenes during the Trojan War or, more commonly, during Hercules' legendary ninth labor. Some of such vessels were inscribed with names of Amazons, with Andromache being named the most often, though none of the non-Herculean battles possessed such inscriptions. Hercules was quite often portrayed on such vessels to be in single combat against three Amazons or more.

The motifs gradually shift from a mismatch of gendered clothing to portraying them as one of the eastern neighbors or the 'Other'. The non-Greek values associated with the Amazons are reflected in their attire. Most significantly, the clothing Amazons were depicted wearing, such as Attic tunics, chitons, or Corinthian caps, played a key role in representing their foreign identity. These elements were drawn from eastern cultures familiar to the Greeks at the time. Thus, the foreign aspects of Amazonian attire were culturally constructed and were limited primarily to the East Greek islands. Portraying the Amazons as parthenoi, the symbol of defying societal norms also reflects the ‘otherness’ as well. This is demonstrated by the depiction of Amazonomachy in Amphora (storage vessel): Herakles in Combat with the Amazon Andromache, White-ground alabastron: Amazon and Terracotta Nolan neck-amphora (jar).

Amazons were eventually seen on red-figure pottery as black-figure pottery gradually became less popular during the last quarter of the 6th Century. It was also around this time that Theseus also became a common feature in art depicting the Amazonomachy.

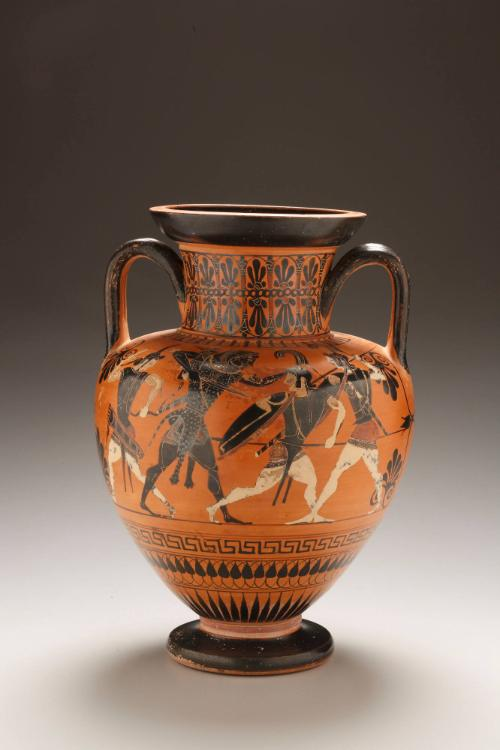
Greek amphora by the Antimenes Painter depicting Herakles battling the Amazon Andromache, originating from Attica, Greece, dated to 525–500 BCE.

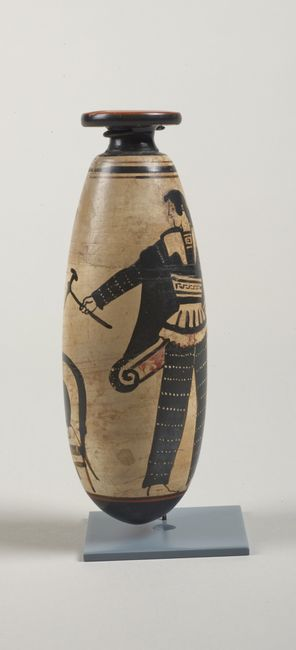
The white-ground alabastron, dated to around 480–470 BCE, is a Greek Attic ceramic attributed to the Syriskos Painter (ca 500–475 BCE)

==== Amphora (storage vessel): Herakles in Combat with the Amazon Andromache ====
The ovoid neck amphora depicts a battle scene between the Amazons and Herakles, a popular Graeco-Roman hero in many myths. The Amazon’s liminal identity of both adhering to Greek and ‘non-Greek’ values is demonstrated through the female body dressed as a Greek Hoplite, an infantry soldier. This is shown through the armory and the shield they are wearing. It’s interesting to note that the Amazon depiction still follows the conventions of depicting Greek figures in white flesh in black-figure pottery, despite non-conformity.

==== White-ground alabastron: Amazon ====
The vase depicts an Amazon warrior, its depiction inspired by elements of Eastern culture, particularly the Scythians. The Amazon is wearing the ependytes, an Eastern-style garment consisting of long-sleeved pants under a sleeveless tunic. This attire was a common indicator of Amazons in Greek art, as artists frequently used it to convey the Amazons’ Eastern origins. She also wears a Scythian cap with two points. These garments are unfamiliar to Athenian tradition but instead reference Scythian attire, which would have been recognizable to Athenians at the time. However, she is still identified as an Amazon warrior due to the lack of a pointed beard.

The reference to Eastern culture and the Amazons’ nonconformity to Greek values associates them with the concept of the ‘barbarian Other’—a term referring to anyone who was not Greek, including civilians from Asia Minor, Assyria, and Persia. As Athenians began to familiarize themselves with Eastern-style attire and customs by 550 BCE due to increasing contact, artists often employed Eastern characteristics to represent the ‘Other’ in art. By depicting the Amazons with attributes associated with the Scythians, a group from the Eurasian steppes, they are categorized as the "Other" as well by being categorized as foreign both geographically and physically.

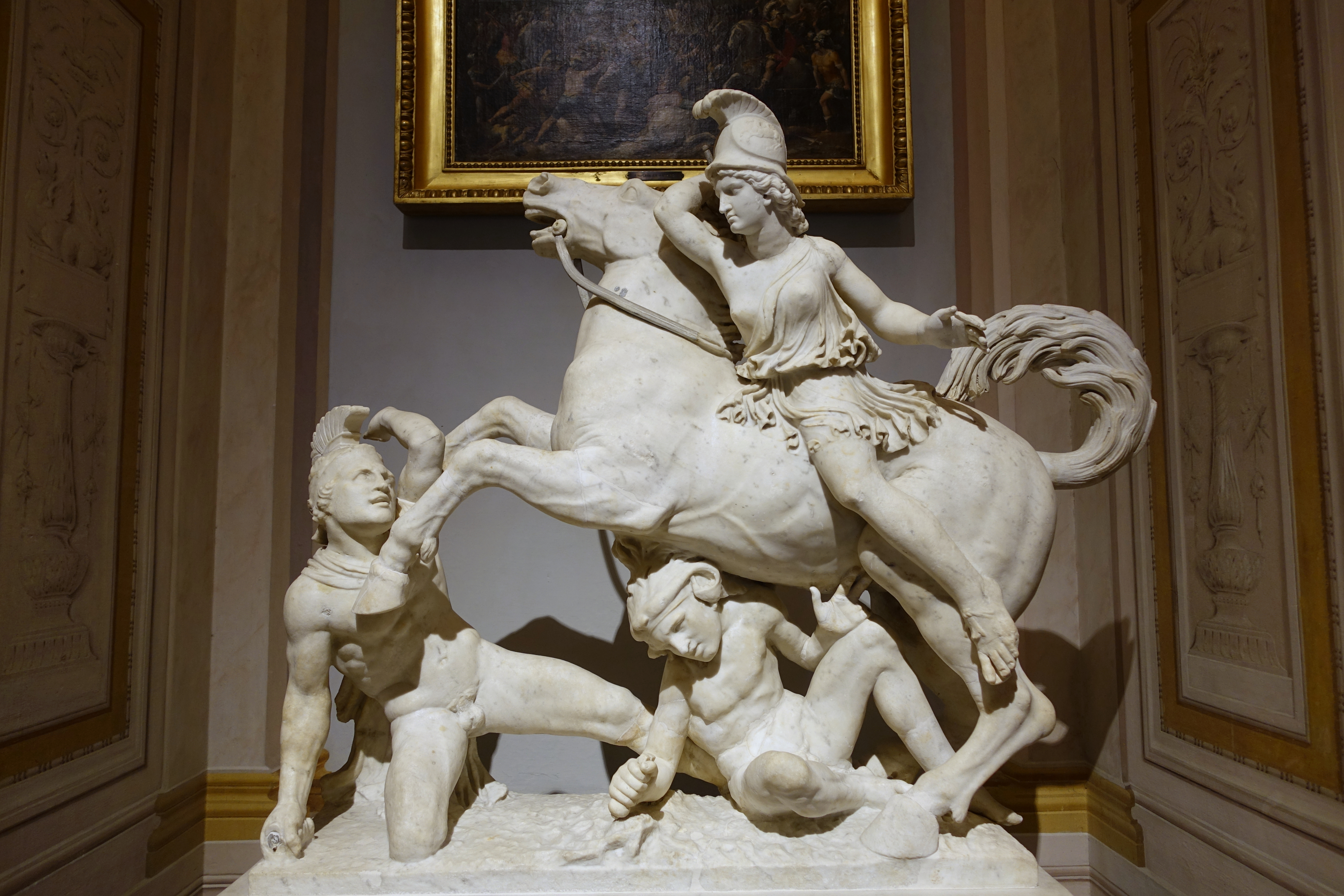
Amazon with barbarian and Greek, Roman copy of Greek original, detail, c. 160 AD, marble; Galleria Borghese

==== Terracotta Nolan neck-amphora (jar' ====
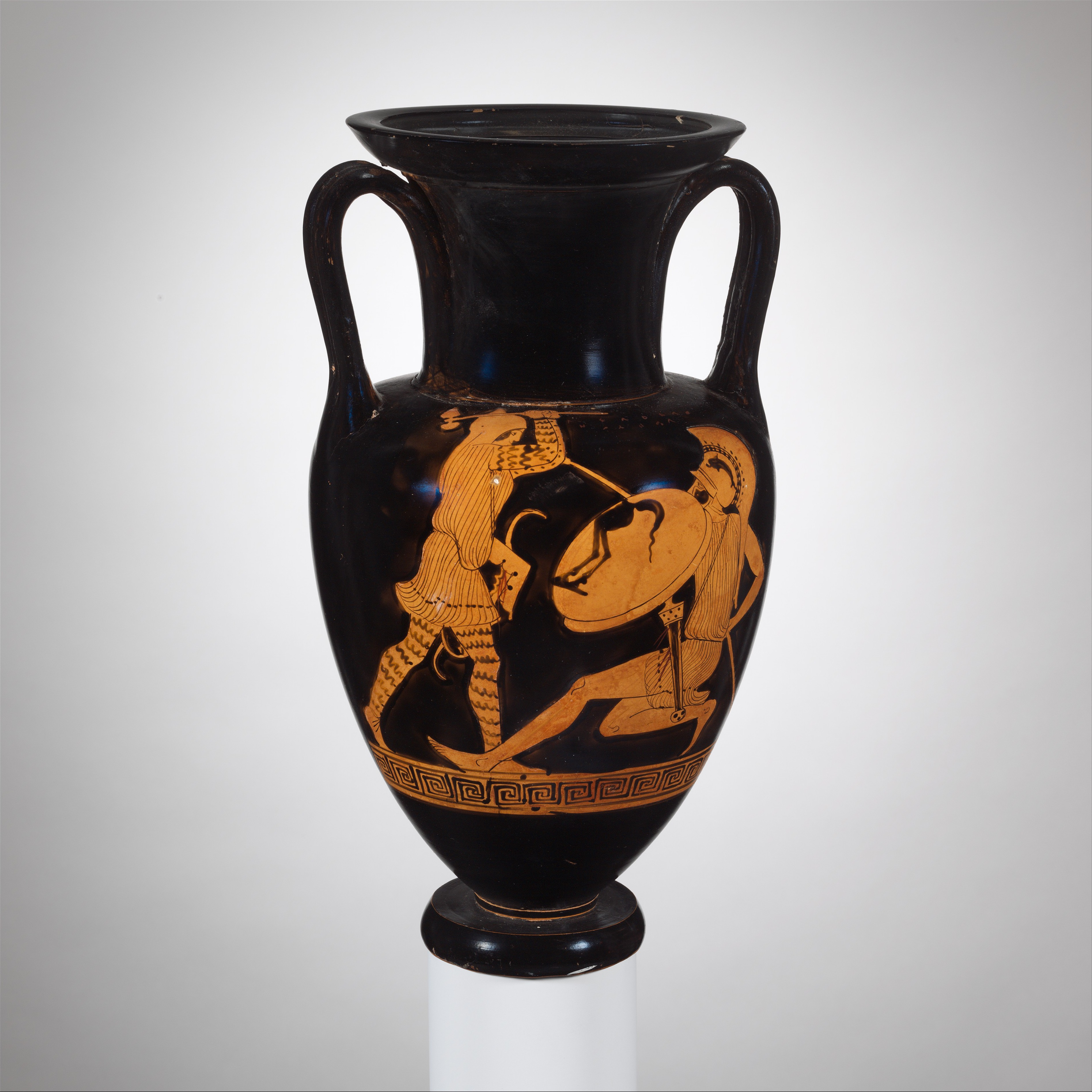
Classical Greek Attic terracotta Nolan neck-amphora (ca. 440–430 BCE), attributed to the Dwarf Painter.

The vase depicts a combat between a Greek (left) and an Amazon warrior (right). Amazons, unlike male heroes or female prostitutes, were never portrayed nude; however, like most depictions of women, they were usually clothed. She wears a chiton with a pattern, an attire that is worn by athletic girls. This connects with Stewart’s analysis mentioned above, where Amazons were depicted as wild and unrestrained prepubescent girls—parthenoi. However, the Amazon representation here falls vaguely into the third gender, not truly feminine despite the chiton attire nor masculine, though engaging in warfare like Greek heroes. This reinforces their status as ‘other’ by not conforming to the traditional gender norms of Ancient Greece.

=== Greek Architecture ===
Depictions of Amazon battles in Greek architecture generally fell into the category of late antique to post-classical architectural sculpture. Examples of this can be found on the west gable of the temple of Apollo at Eretria (from around the end of the 6th century BC), and on the metopes or friezes at places such as the Athenian treasury at Delphi (490 BC), the Hephaestium at Athens (450 BC), the temple of Zeus at Olympia (460 BC), the temple of Apollo at Bassae (410 BC), the east hill at Selinunte (470 BC), the mausoleum at Halicarnassus (350 BC), and the Artemis temple in Magnesia (2nd century BC).

After the Persian Wars, the Greeks attached greater significance to such battle scenes, referencing the Attic War as a mythological example of Athens’ successful defense against foreign invaders. In particular, this Attic amazonomachy was depicted on places such as the west metope on the Parthenon (around 440 BC), shield of Athena Parthenos (around 440 BC), and in the Stoa Poikile in Athens (460 BC).

==== West Metopes of Parthenon ====
Kalamis, a Greek sculptor, is attributed to designing the west metopes of the Parthenon, a temple on the Athenian Acropolis dedicated to the Greek goddess Athena. The west metopes of the Parthenon depict a battle between Greeks and Amazons. Despite its mutilated state, scholars generally concur that the scene represents the Amazon invasion of Attica.

==== Shield of Athena Parthenos ====
The shield of Athena Parthenos, sculpted by Phidias, depicts a fallen Amazon. Athena Parthenos was a massive chryselephantine sculpture of Athena, the main cult image inside the Parthenon at Athens, which is now lost, though known from descriptions and small ancient copies.

==== Frieze in Temple of Apollo at Bassae ====
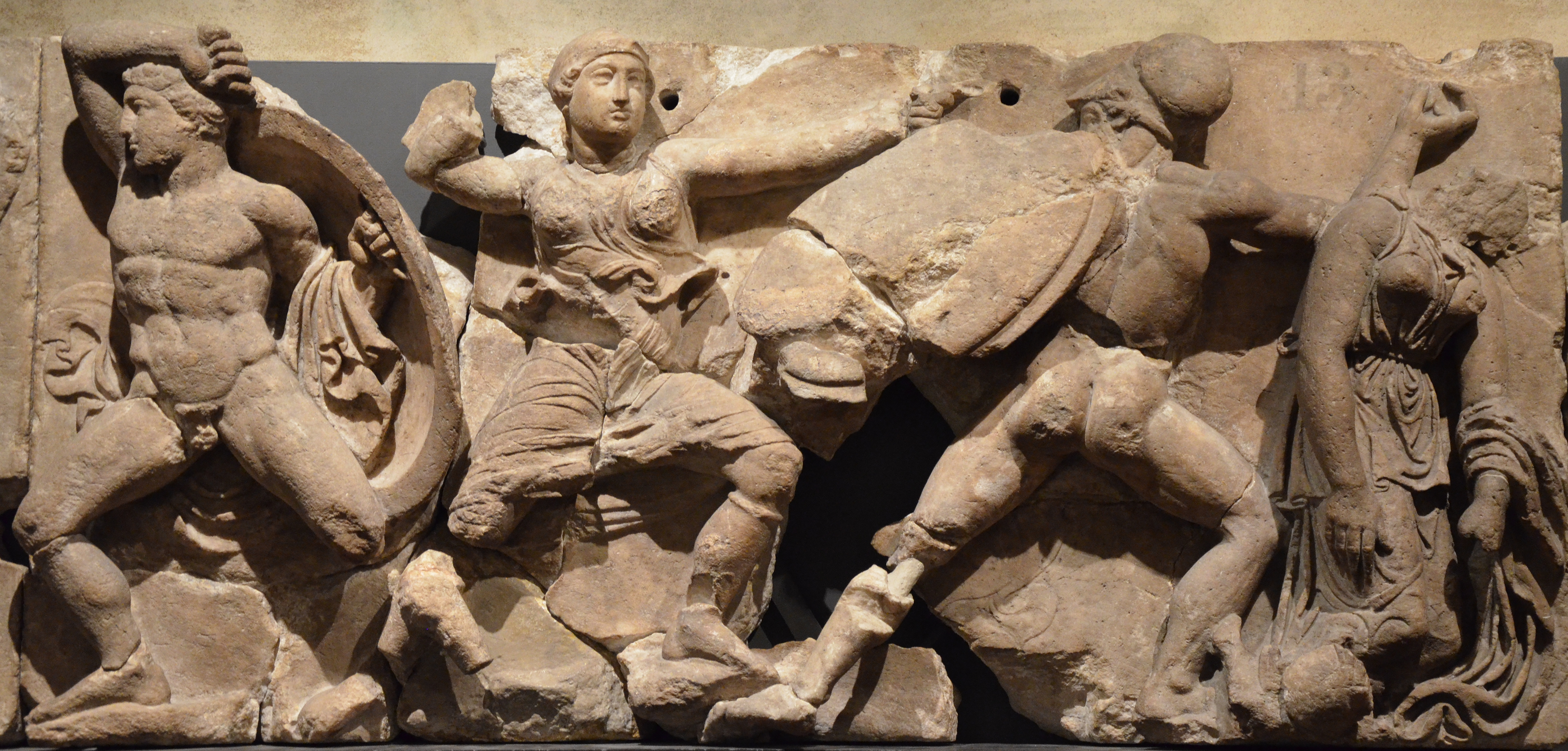
Block from the Bassae Frieze, c. 420-400 BC

The Bassae Frieze, from the Temple of Apollo at Bassae, contains a number of slabs portraying Trojan Amazonomachy and Heraclean Amazonomachy. The Trojan Amazonomachy spans three blocks, displaying the eventual death of Penthesilea at the hands of Achilles. The Heraclean Amazonomachy spans eight blocks and represents the struggle of Heracles to seize the belt of the Amazon queen Hippolyta.

==== Frieze from Mausoleum at Halicarnassus ====
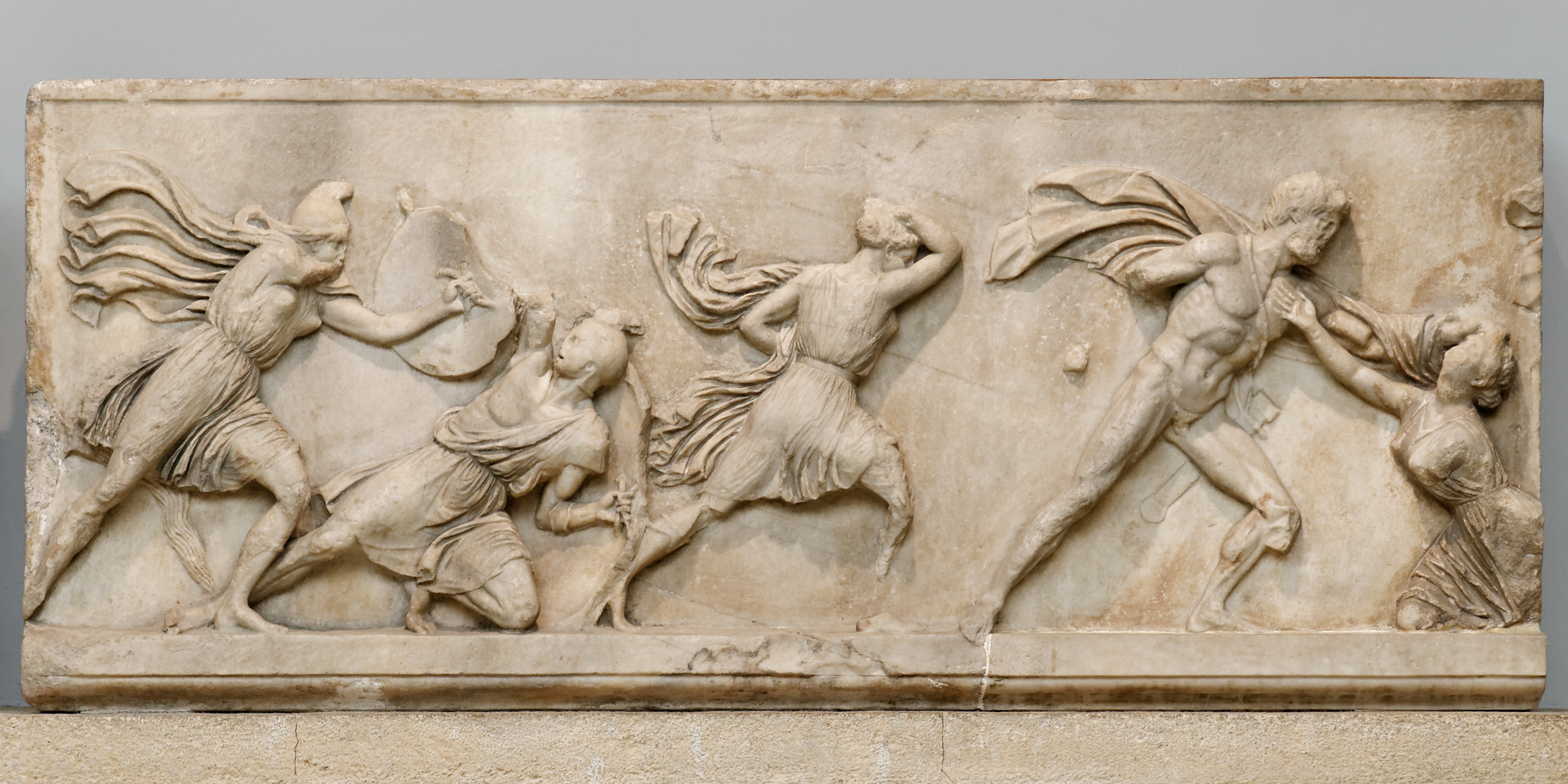
Mausoleum at Halicarnassus

Several sections of an Amazonomachy frieze from the Mausoleum at Halicarnassus are now in the British Museum. One part depicts Heracles grasping an Amazon by the hair, while holding a club behind his head in a striking manner. This Amazon is believed to be the Amazon queen Hippolyta. Behind Heracles is a scene of a Greek warrior clashing shields with an Amazon warrior. Another slab displays a mounted Amazon charging at a Greek, who is defending himself with a raised shield. This Greek is believed to be Theseus, who joined Heracles during his labors.

==== Other ====
Micon painted the Amazonomachy on the Stoa Poikile of the Ancient Agora of Athens, which is now lost. Phidias depicted Amazonomachy on the footstool of the chryselephantine statue of Zeus at Olympia.

In 2018, archaeologists discovered relief-decorated shoulder boards made from bronze that were part of a breastplate of a Greek warrior at a Celtic sacrificial place near the village of Slatina nad Bebravou in Slovakia. Deputy of director of Slovak Archaeological Institute said that it is the oldest original Greek art relic in the area of Slovakia. Researchers analyzed the pieces and determined they were once part of a relief that depicted the Amazonomachy.

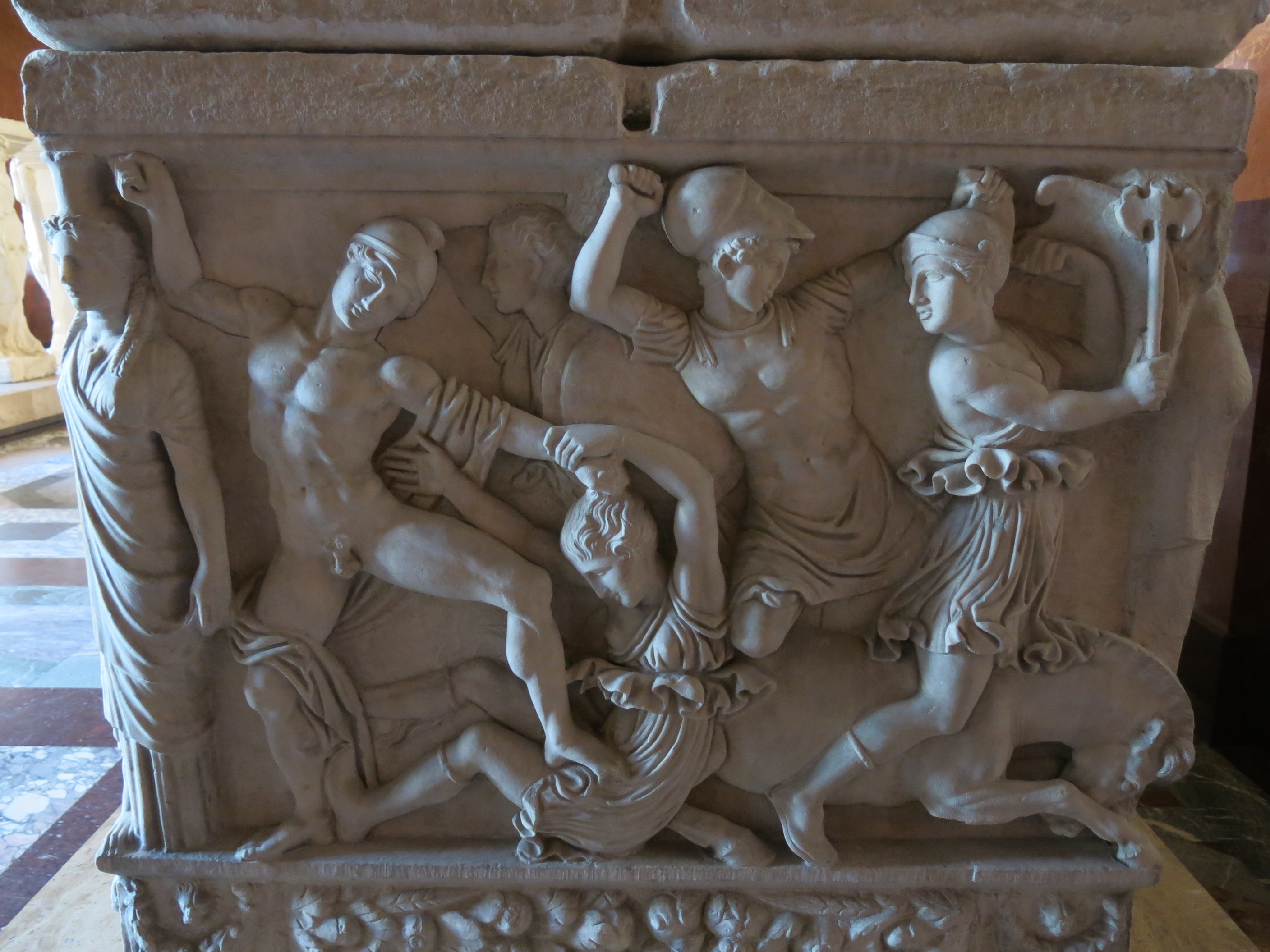
Sarcophagus depicting the battle between Greeks and Amazons.

=== Roman Sarcophagi ===
Many representations of Amazons from the Roman times have also been found, with images of the amazonomachy included on mosaics, coins, friezes, votive reliefs, and so on. Notably, more than 60 sarcophagus reliefs have been found to depict scenes of conflict between the Amazons and Greeks.

== Historical Existence of Amazonomachy ==
=== Accounts of Amazon Graves ===
In Athens, there were tombs of Amazons, possibly located in the Amazoneion, northwest of the Areópagos. This area was close to the ancient agora of Theseus, and the Theseion may have been nearby.

Writers such as Plutarch, Kleidemos, and Pausanias cited the existence of Amazon graves throughout Athens to be historical evidence and landmarks of the Amazons’ campaign against the city. As stated in Plutarch’s Life of Theseus: “... the fact that [the Amazons] encamped virtually within the city is supported both by place names and by the graves of the fallen.”

Many of these writers' renditions of the battles between the Amazons and Greeks were based on the distribution and of graves attributed to the Amazons throughout Athens. Plutarch's account later goes on to cite Kleidemos in his description of how the Attic amazonomachy corresponded with the placement of some of the Athenian Amazon graves:

The left wing of the Amazons extended to what is now called the Amazoneion … and the Athenians fought against this, attacking the Amazons from the Mouseion hill, and the graves of the fallen are along the wide street that goes to the gate at the Heroon of Chalcodon, which they now call the Peiraic Gate.

The grave of Theseus’ wife (either Antiope or Hippolyta) was identified by Pausanias (1.2.1) and Plutarch (Theseus 27.5) to be located near the Sanctuary of Gaia in Athens. Another Amazon Molpadia was said to have died and been buried there as well during the Amazons' campaign.

According to (the Boeotian) Plutarch, Amazons were not only buried in Athens but were also known to have fled and possibly engaged in further battles elsewhere, being buried in places such as Megara, Boiotia, Chalkis, and in Thessaly at Skotoussa and Kynoskephalai.

=== Possible Historical Counterparts ===
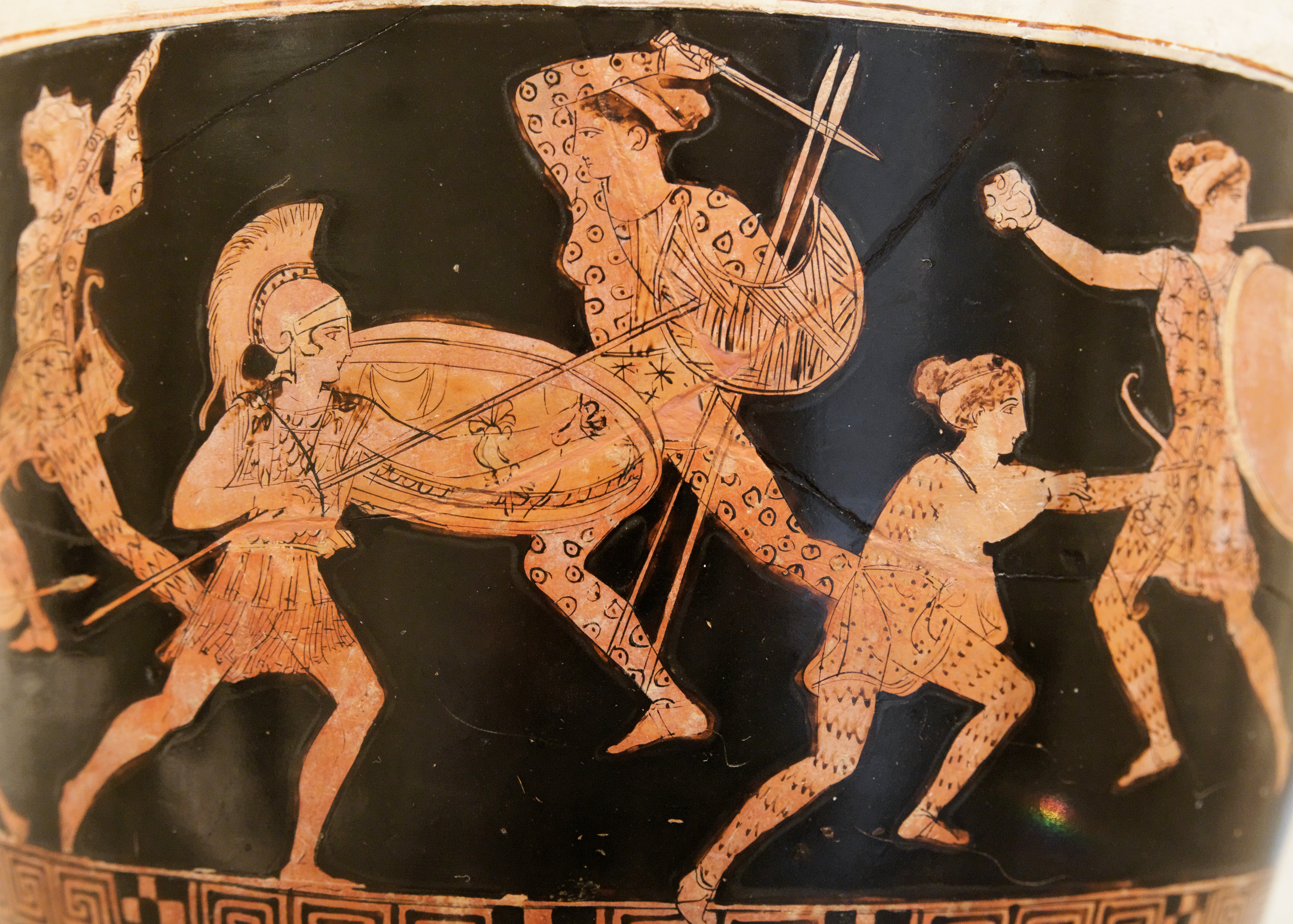
Detail of vase, c. 420 BC

As Greek civilization began to extend to areas around the Black Sea, the Greeks began to identify and associate these mythical wild and warlike foreign females with the Scythians in their artwork and literature. In particular, the Amazons were often portrayed similarly to steppe nomad horsewomen. As the Greeks became more aware of steppe nomad cultures, their depictions of the Amazons in art and literature began to integrate more realistic details corresponding to the artifacts (weaponry, attire, & equipment) found in kurgans (grave mounds) of Scythians.

Despite the lack of conclusive evidence pointing to the existence of the Amazons, some modern scholars and archaeologists have claimed that such steppe nomad horsewomen could have potentially existed as the Amazons’ historical counterparts. Though their actual connection to the mythical Amazons is controversial, there is evidence which supports the historical existence of such steppe warrior women, as modern excavations in the 20th century have discovered more than 1,000 tombs of tribes such as the Saka-Scythians across the Eurasian steppes, of which about 300 of these burials have been identified to be those of armed warrior women (as of 2016).

== Gallery ==
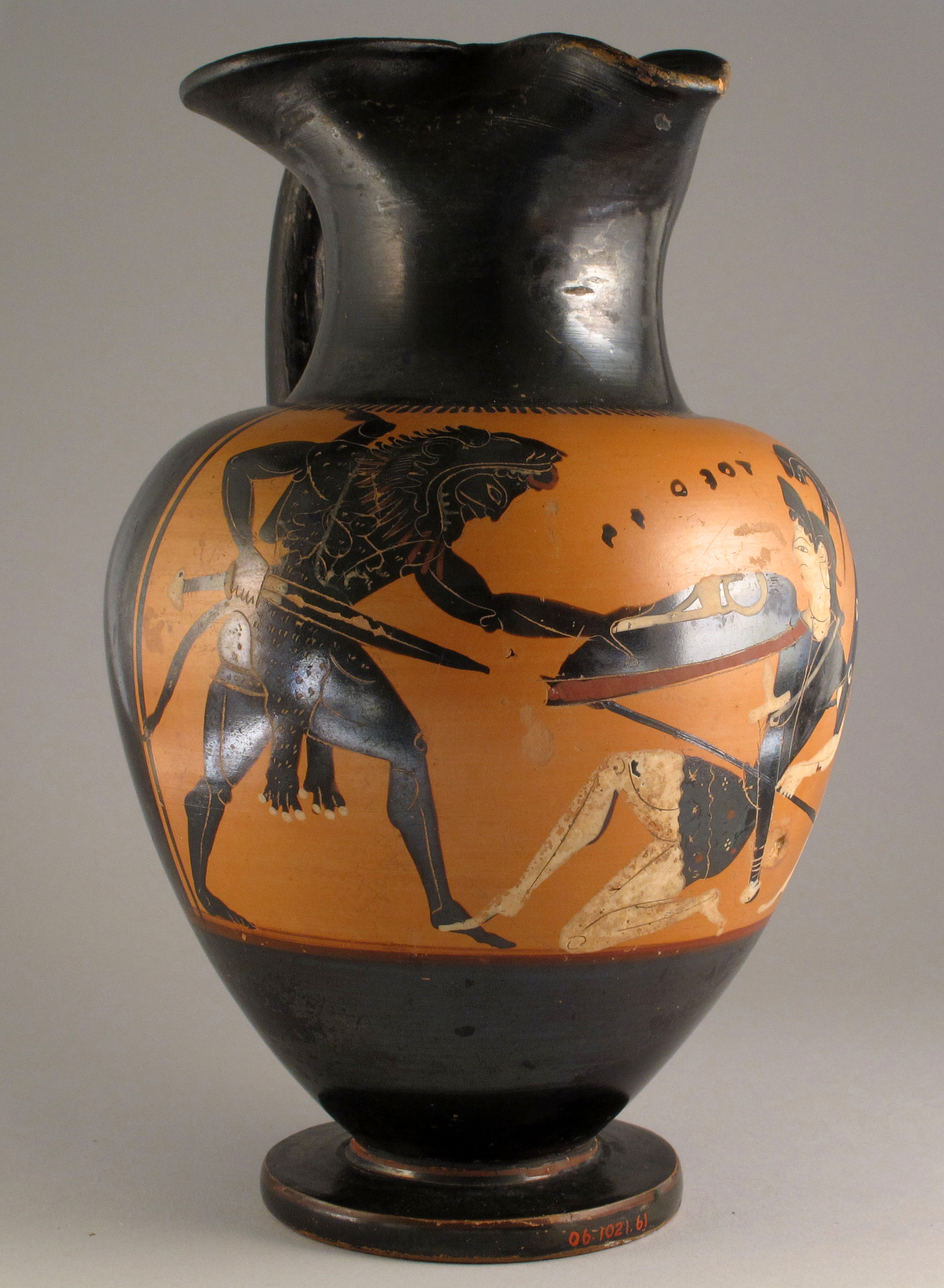
Heracles in the battle, 6th century BC

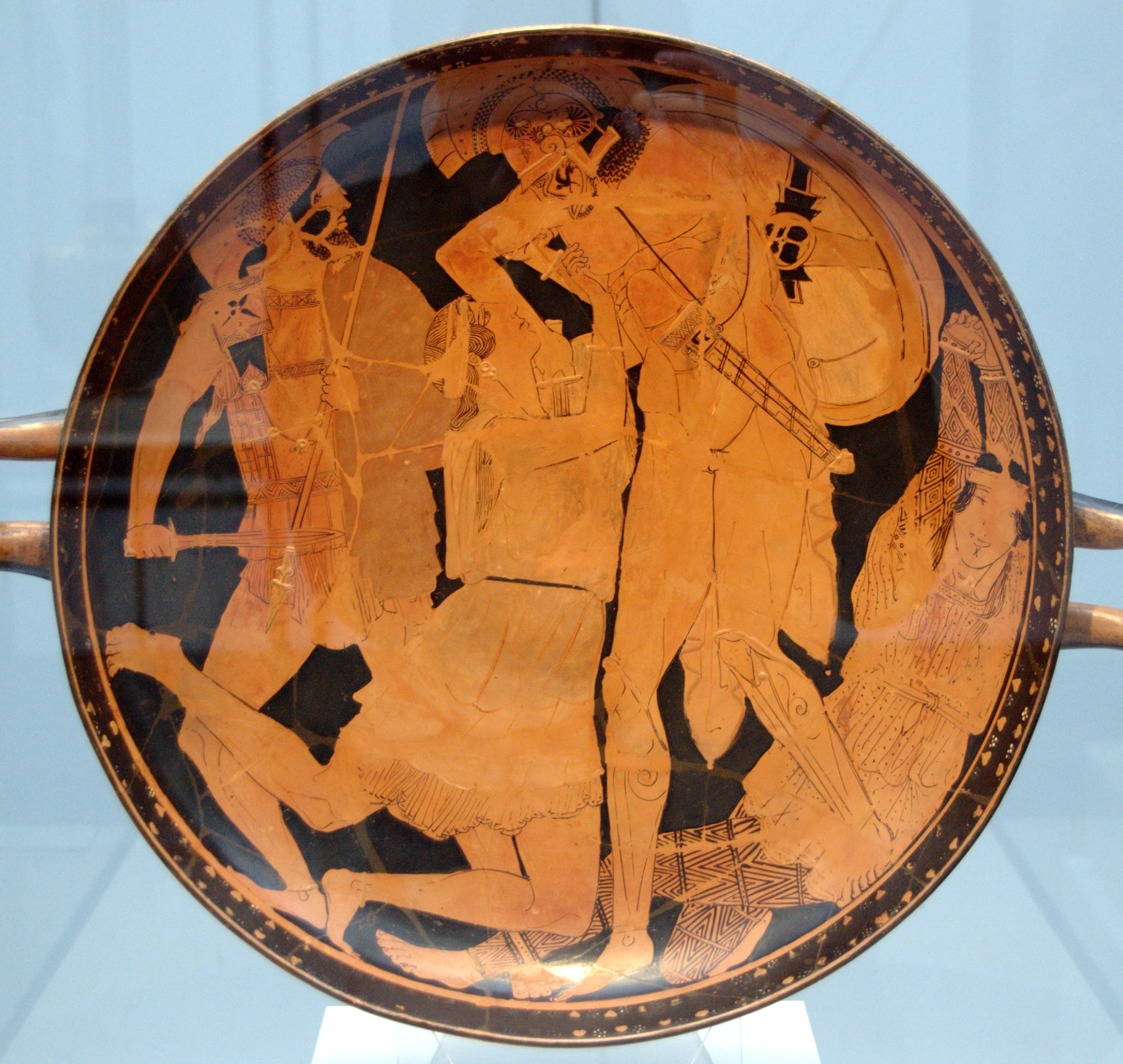
Achilles killing Penthesilea. Tondo of an Attic red-figure kylix, 470–460 BC. From Vulci

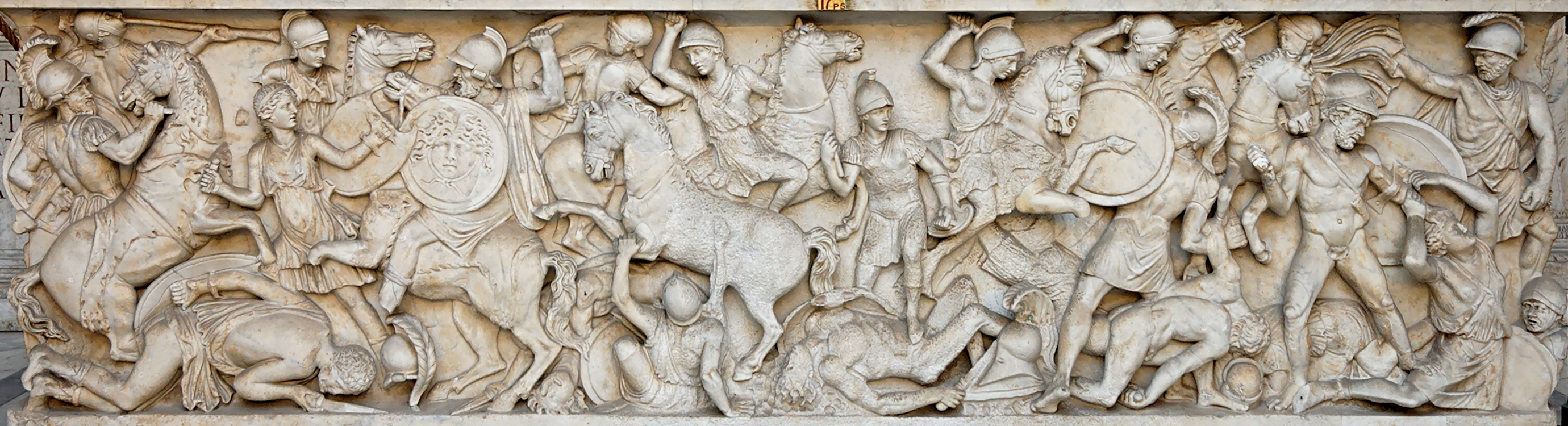
Amazonomachy, marble sarcophagus, c. 160–170 AD, Vatican Museum

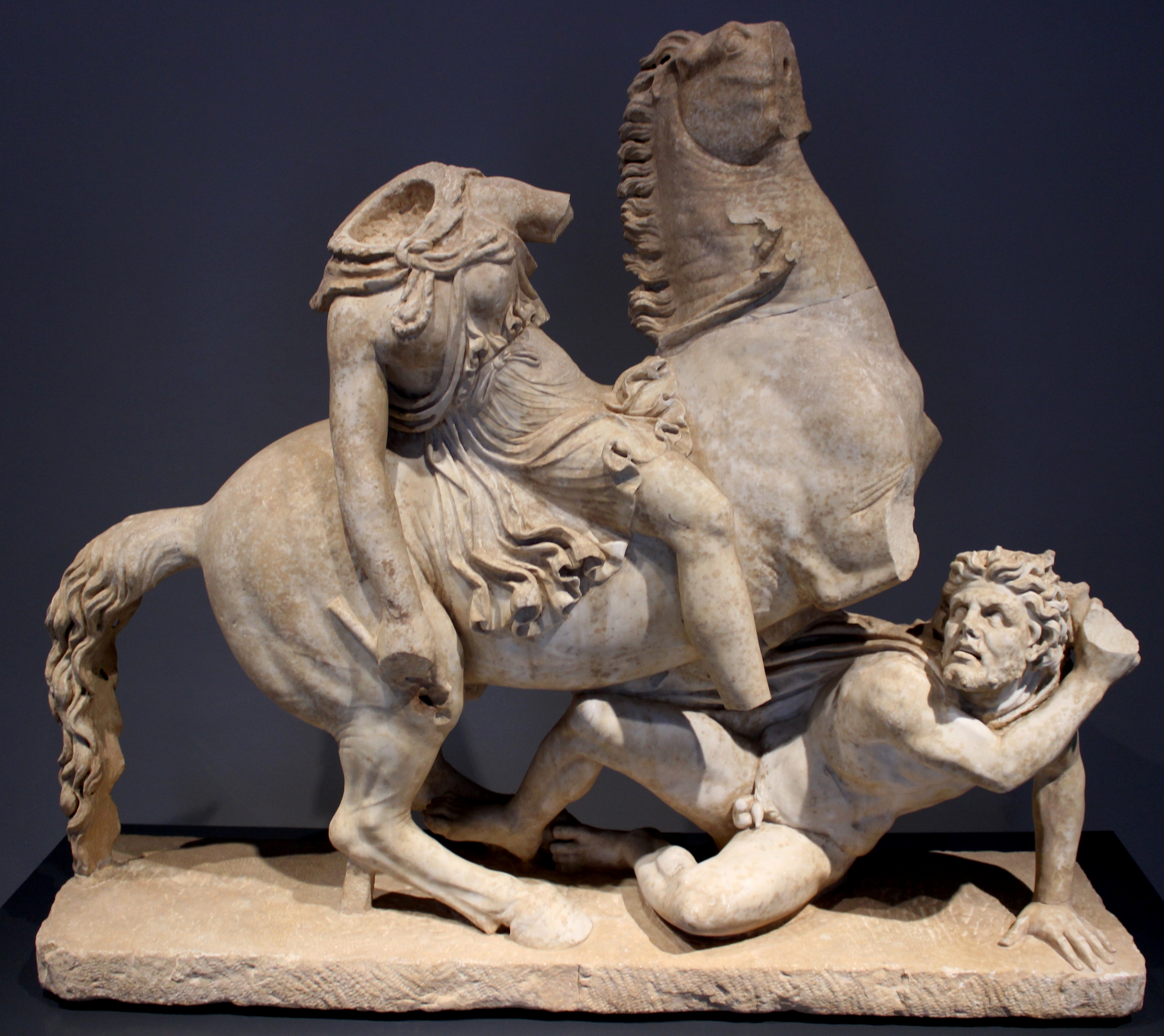
Amazon attacking a Barbarian, sculptural group found in the Anzio Villa, Antonian era – c. 138-192 AD, Roman copy of Greek original. Palazzo Massimo Alle Terme.

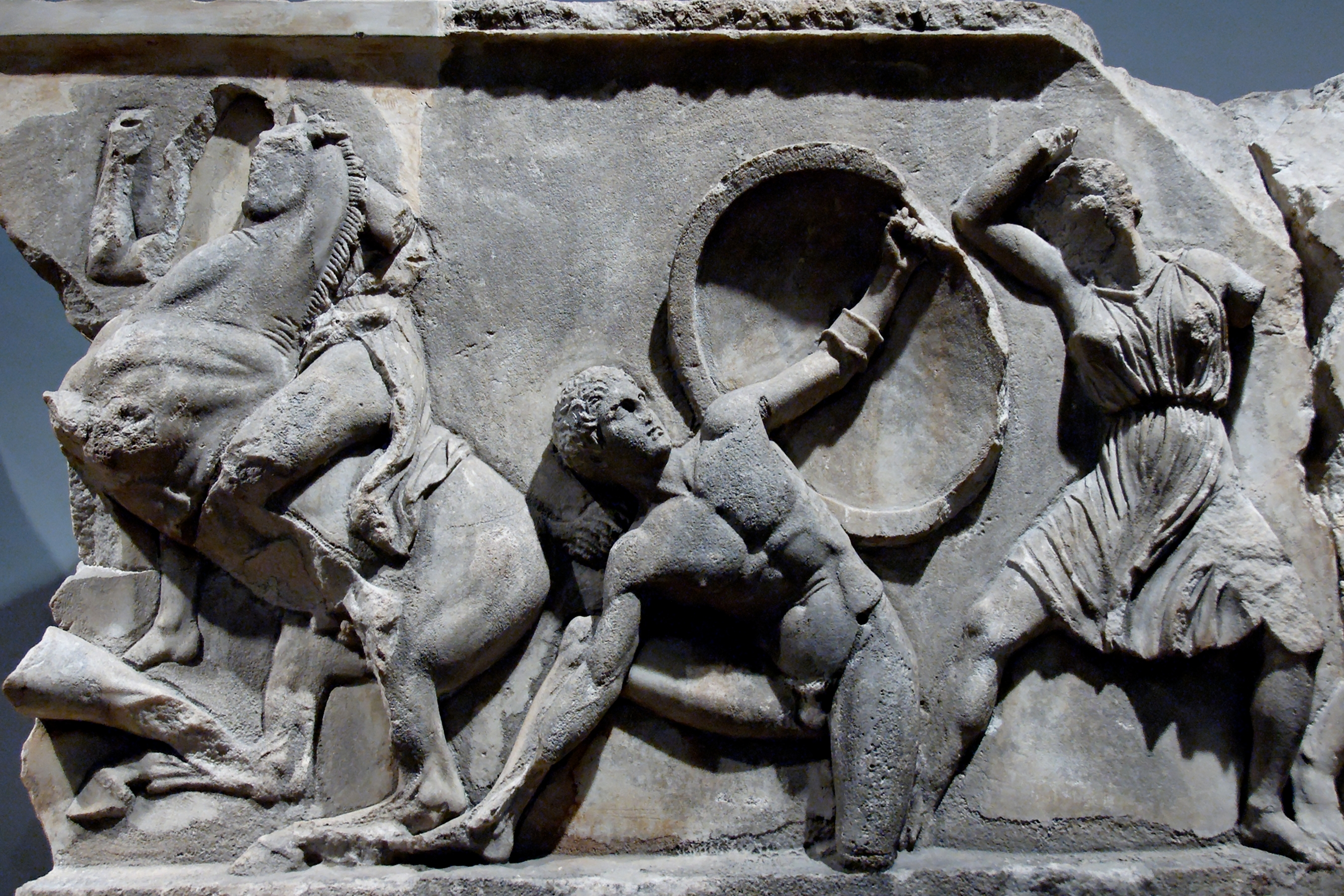
Relief from the ruins of the Mausoleum of Halicarnassus

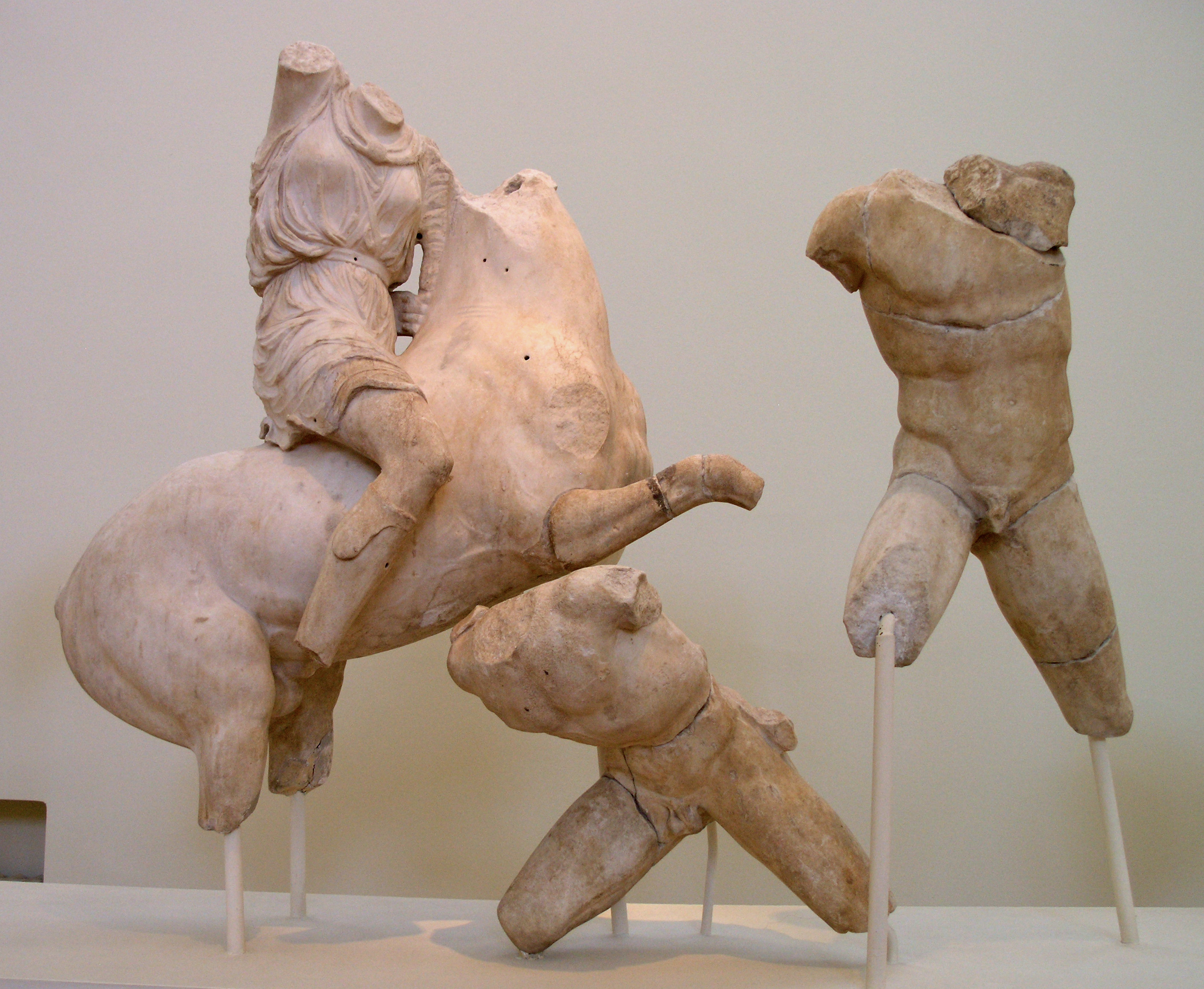
Fragments of the Amazonomachy on the west pediment of the temple of Asklepios. About 380 BC

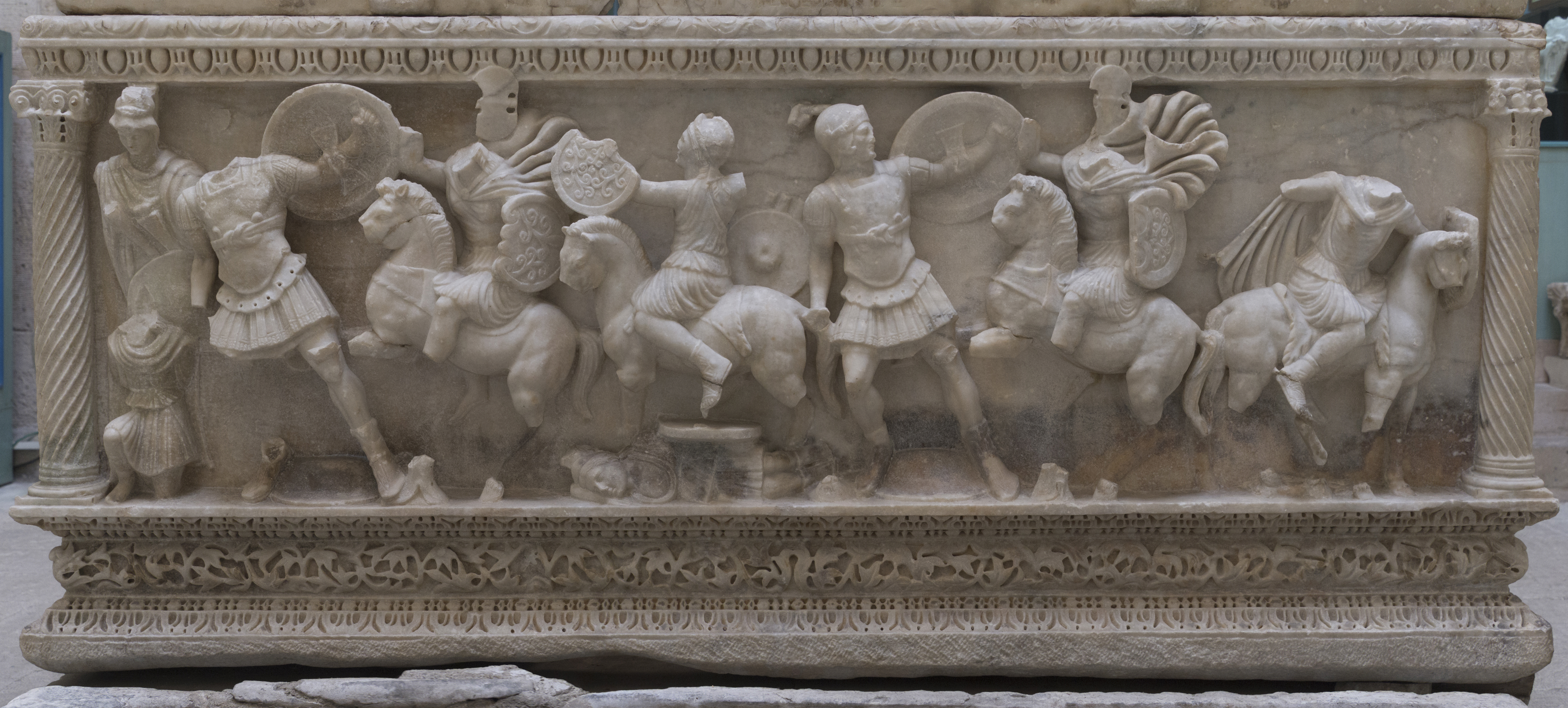
Kutahya archaeological museum Amazonomachy sarcophagus 8837

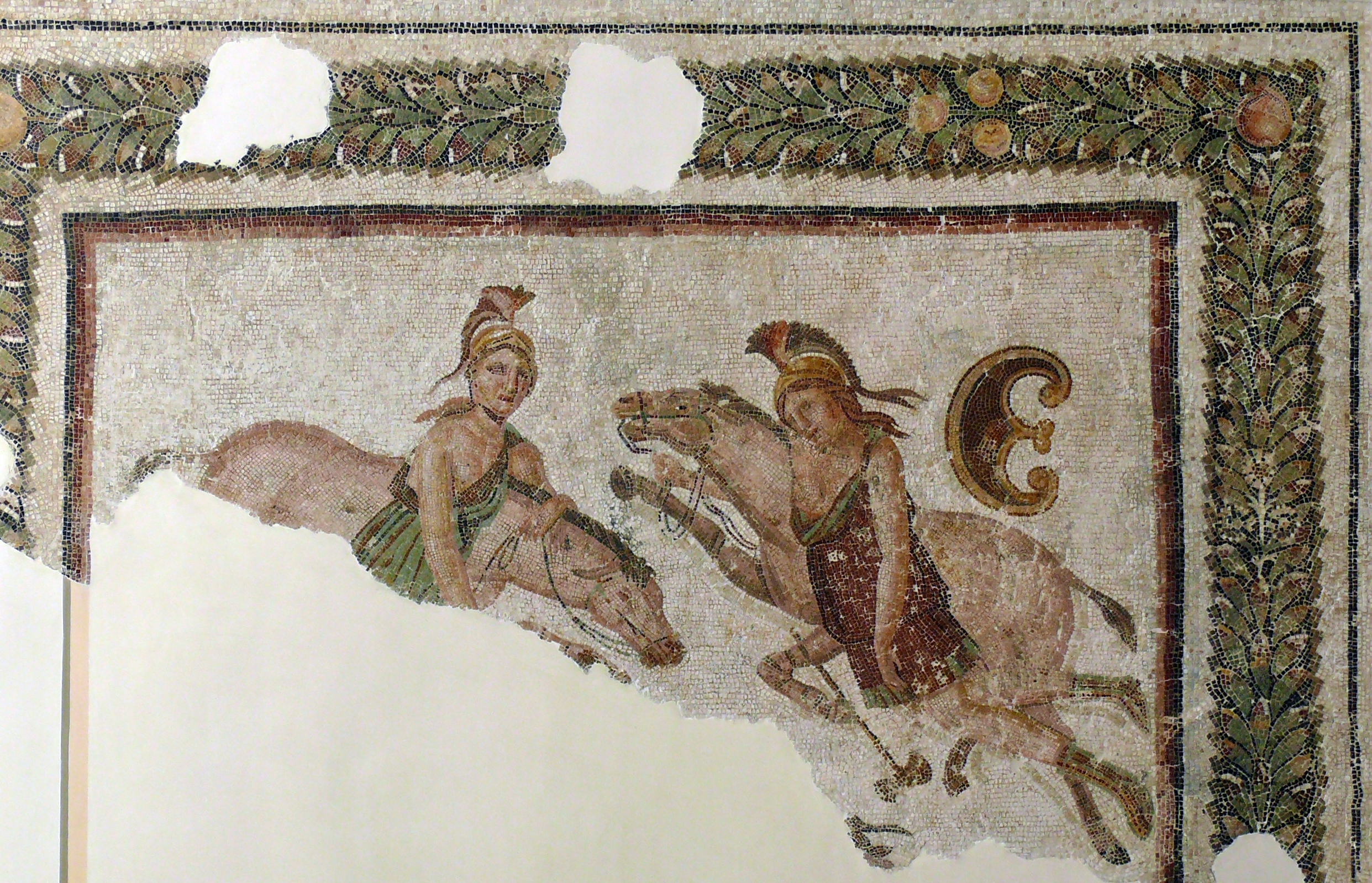
Detail of an early 3rd-century mosaic from modern Tunisia

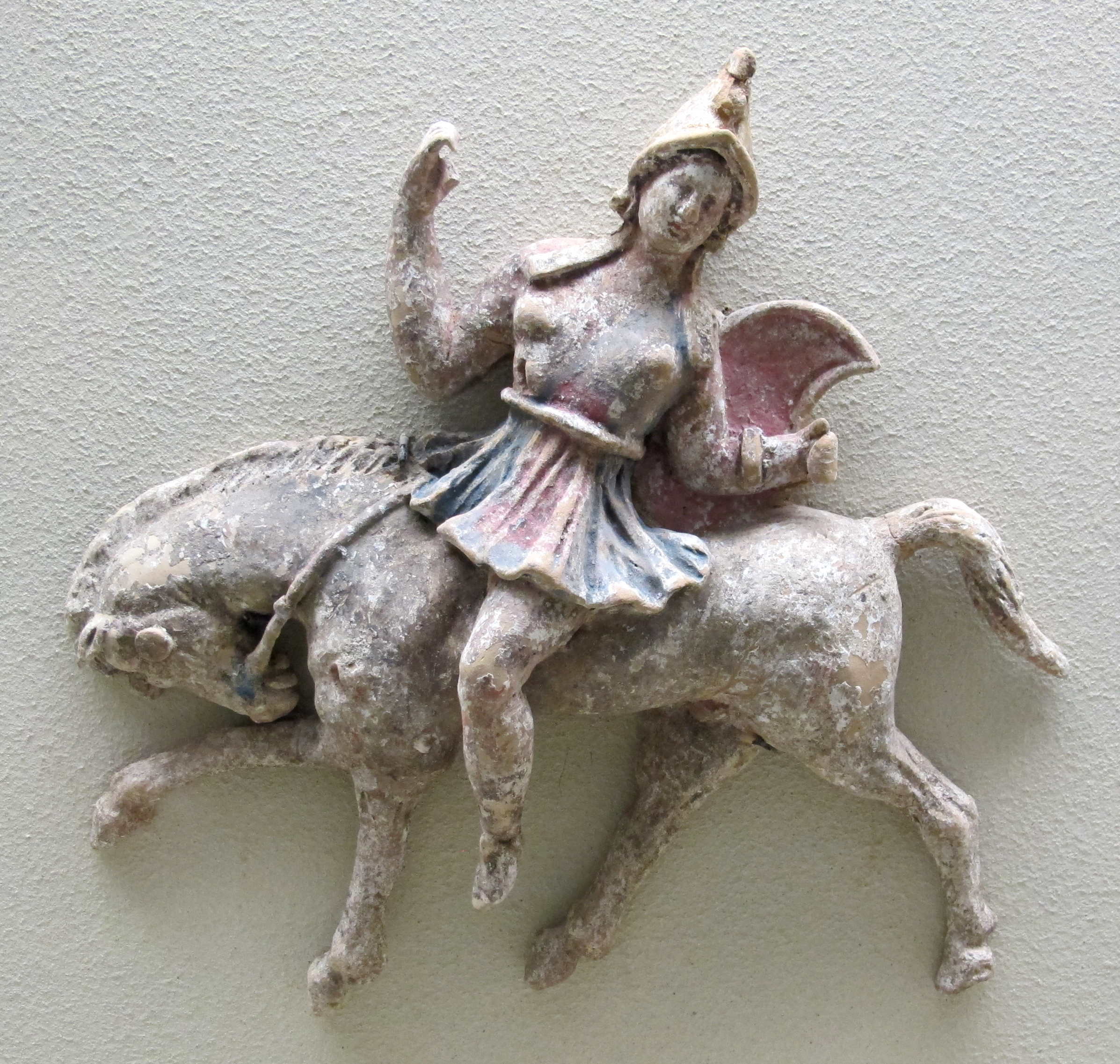
Amazon from a group of terracottas making up an Amazonomachy, c. 300 BC

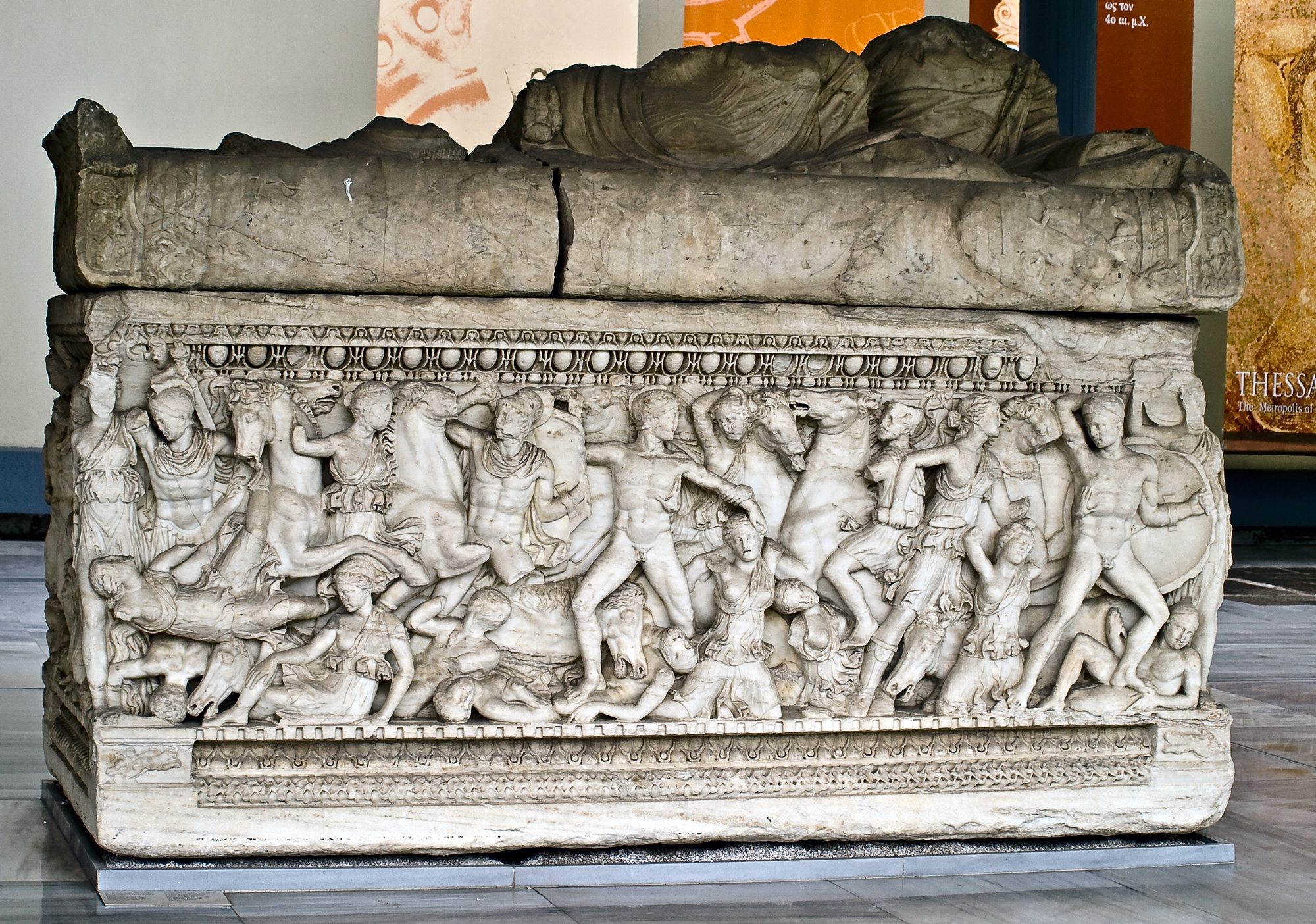
Amazonomachy marble sarcophagus, Archaeological Museum of Thessaloniki

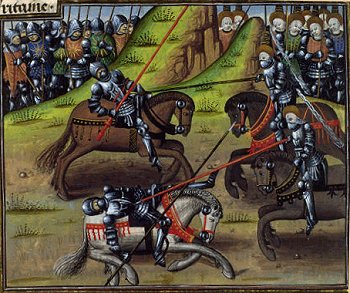
15th century miniature from a Histoires de Troyes; Theseus is shown as a contemporary knight.

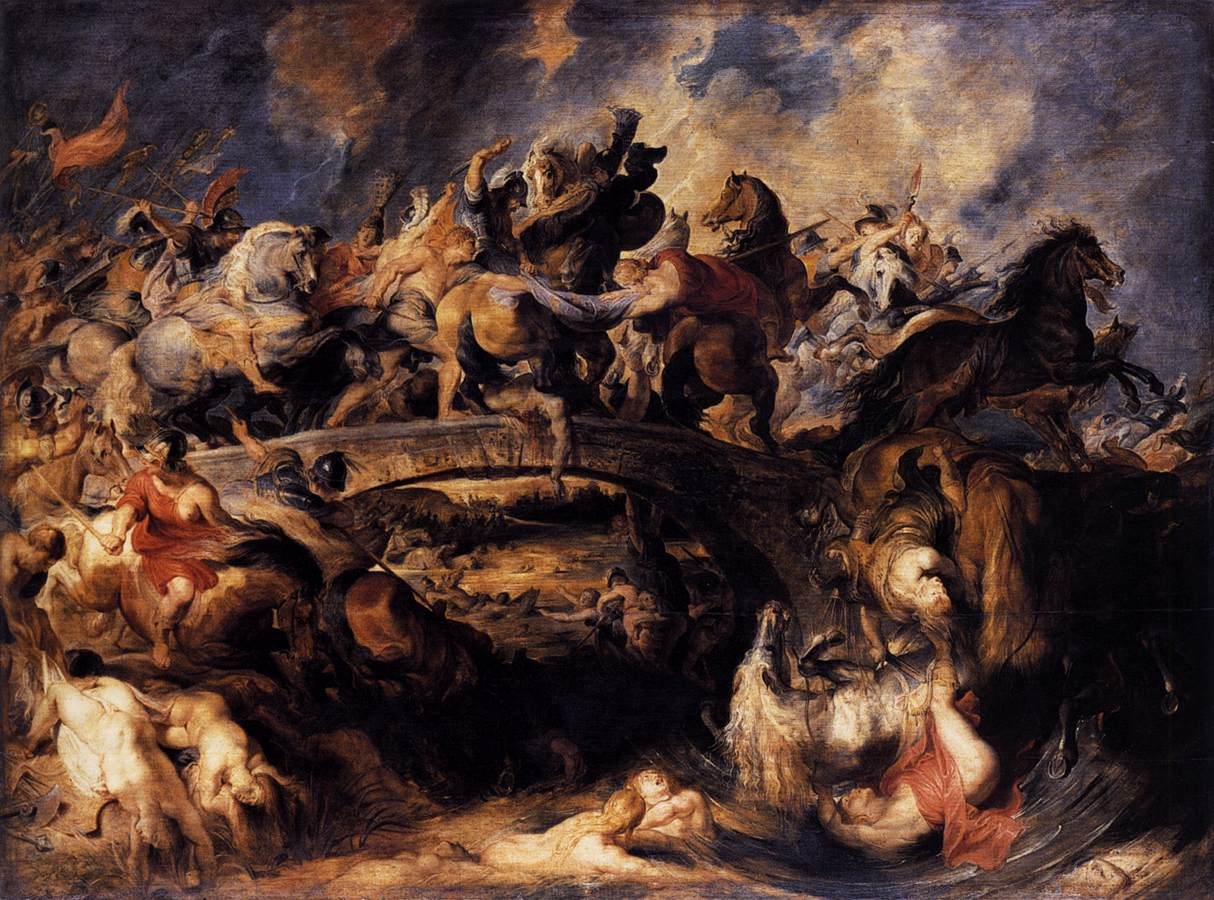
Interpretation by Rubens, 1617–18

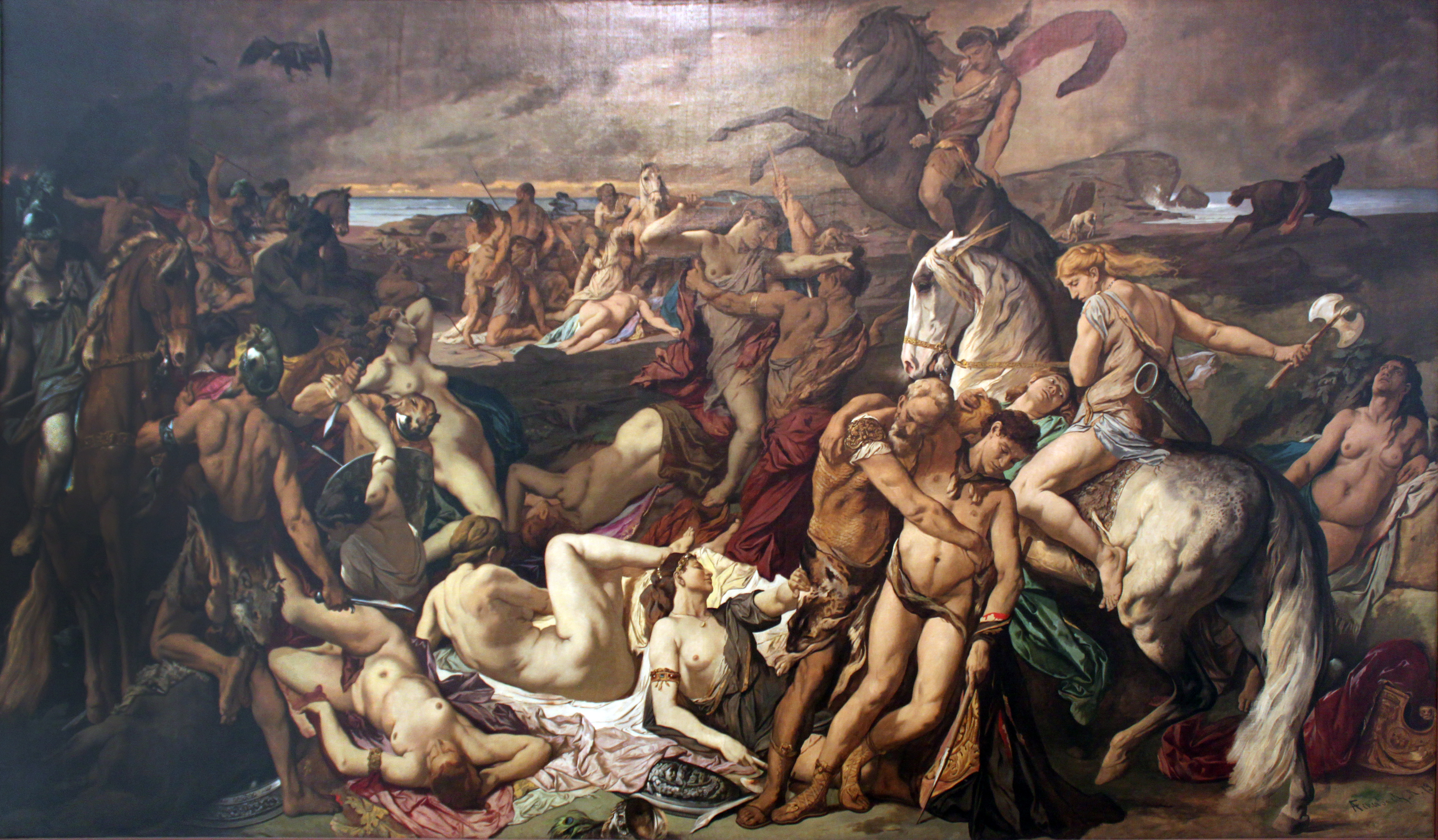
one of two versions by the German Anselm Feuerbach, 1873

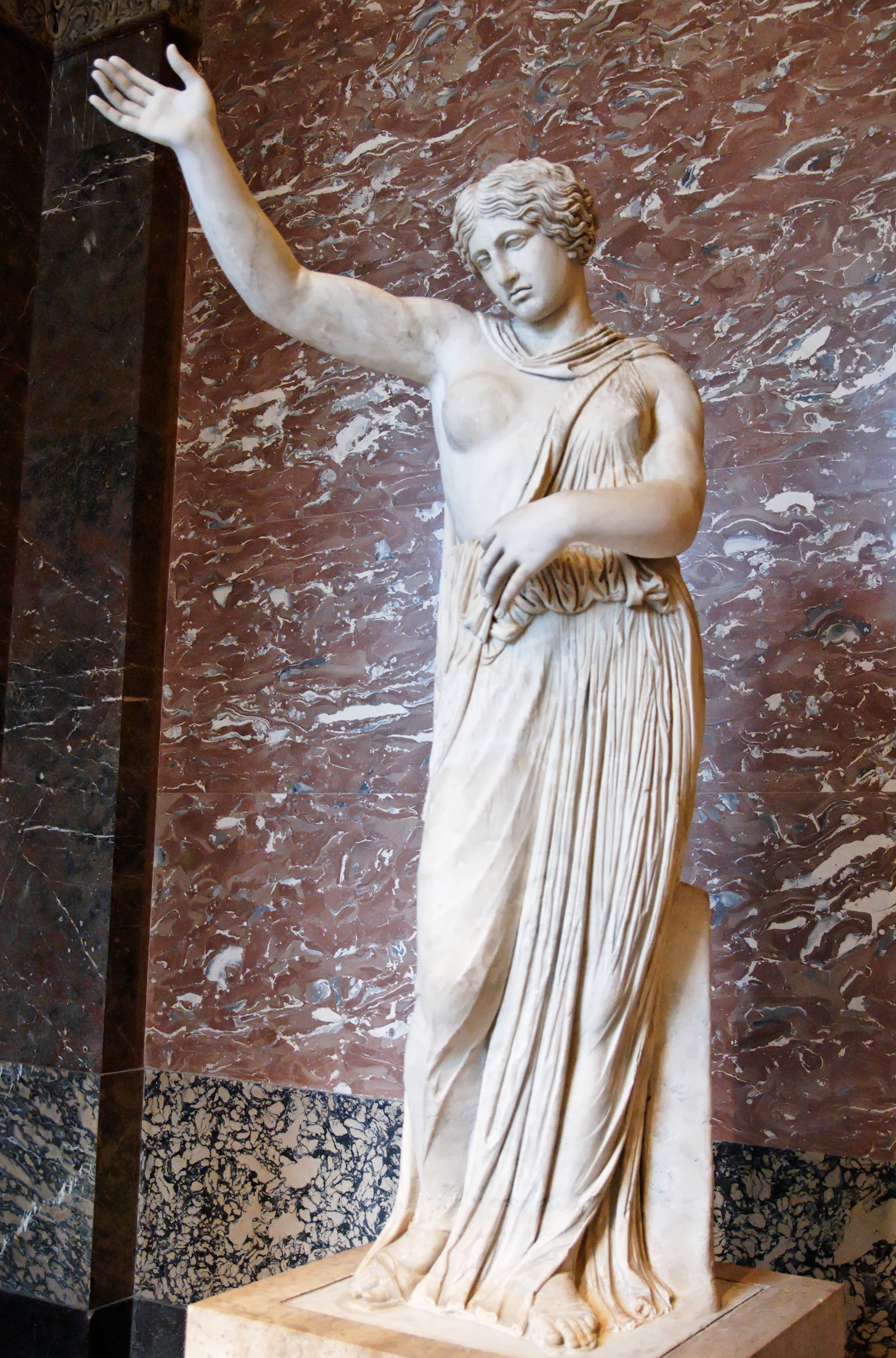
Wounded Amazon, Sosikles type. Roman copy of 5th century BC Greek original.

== See also ==
- For discussion of such battles, see Amazons in historiography
- For the most famous Amazonomachy, see Attic War
- For representation of Amazonomachies as depicted in ancient visual art, see Amazons in art and Warfare in Ancient Greek Art
- Amazon statue types
- Centauromachy
- Gigantomachy
