= Hippolyta =

Queen of the Amazons in Greek mythology

- Queen of the Amazons
- Member of the Amazons
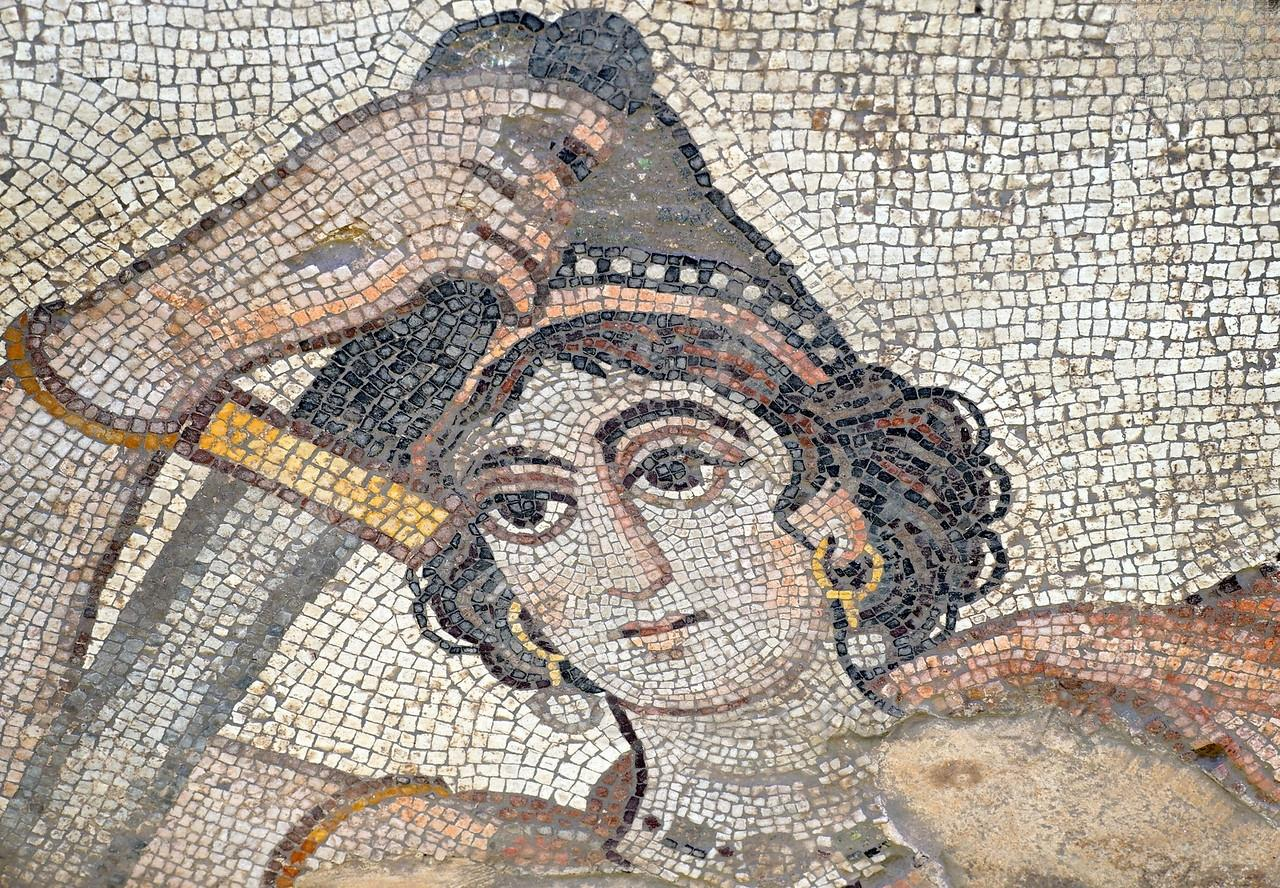
- Hippolyta on a late antique mosaic
- Artifacts: Hippolyta's belt
- Gender: Female

Genealogy
- Parents: Ares (father); Otrera (mother)
- Siblings: Antiope, Melanippe, Penthesilea
- Consort: Theseus, Heracles
- Offspring: Hippolytus

In Greek mythology, Hippolyta or Hippolyte (/hɪˈpɒlɪtə/; Ancient Greek: Ἱππολύτη, romanized: Hippolytē), was the queen of the Amazons and a daughter of Ares and Otrera. Her sisters were Antiope and Melanippe. She wore her father Ares' zoster, which means 'war belt' or 'girdle' in Ancient Greek. Hippolyta figures prominently in the myths of both Heracles and Theseus. The name Hippolyta translates as "she who unleashes the horses", deriving from two Greek roots meaning "horse" and "let loose".

== Legends ==
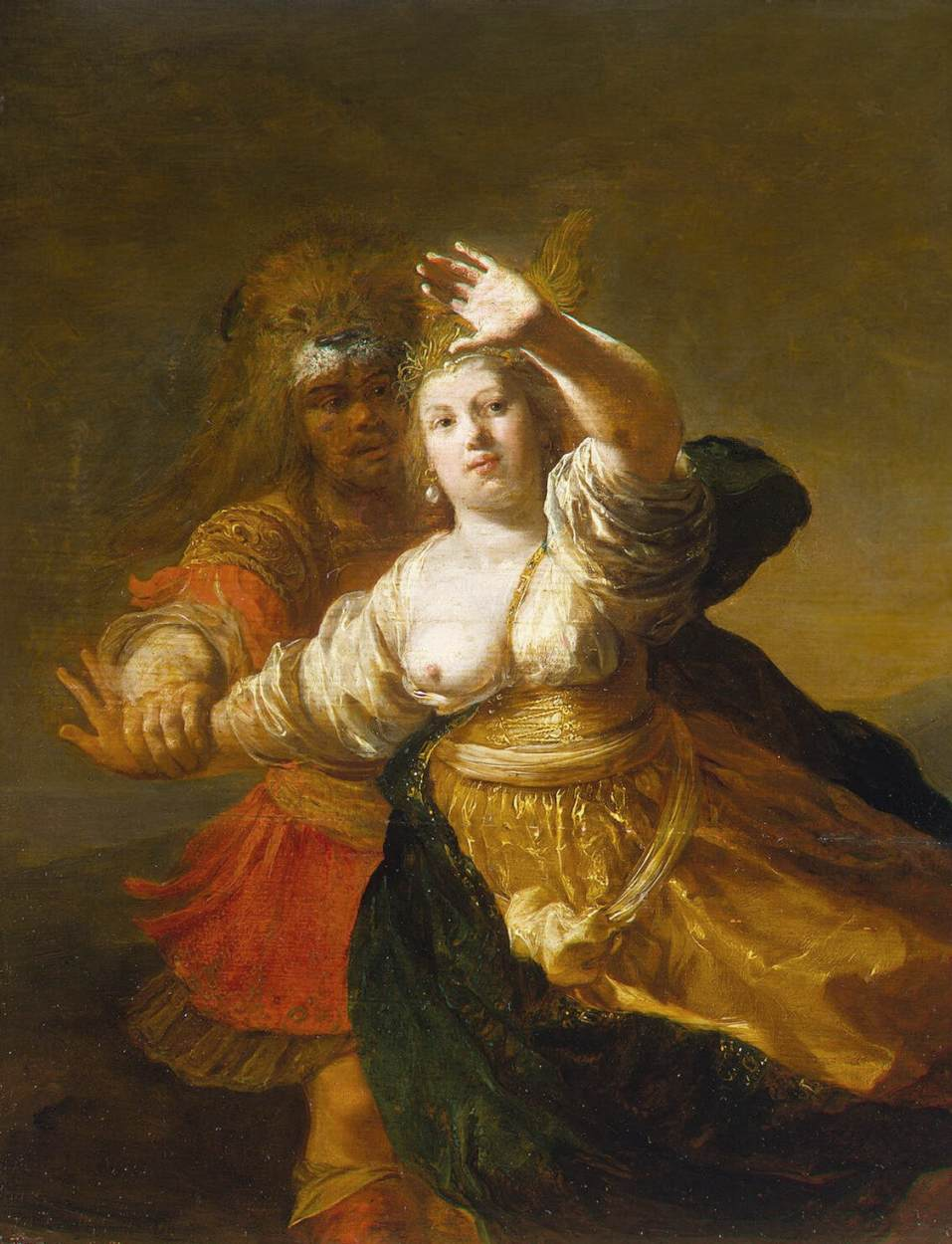
Heracles Obtaining the Belt of Hyppolita by Nikolaus Knüpfer

=== Ninth Labor of Heracles ===
In the myth of Heracles, Hippolyta's belt (ζωστὴρ Ἱππολύτης, zōstḗr Hippolytēs) was the object of his ninth labour. He was sent to retrieve it for Admete, the daughter of King Eurystheus. Most versions of the myth indicate that Hippolyta was so impressed with Heracles that she gave him the belt without argument (In some versions she had sex with Heracles), perhaps while visiting him on his ship. Then, according to Apollodorus, the goddess Hera, making herself appear as one of the Amazons, spread a rumour among them that Heracles and his crew were abducting their queen, so the Amazons attacked the ship. Among Hippolyta's warriors was Aella, who was the first to charge at Heracles during the battle. Despite her courage, she fell to Heracles, who, clad in the invulnerable skin of the Nemean lion, defeated her and the other Amazons. Ultimately, he overpowered Hippolyta, stripped her of the belt, and sailed away, thus fulfilling his labor.

=== Adventure of Theseus ===
In the myth of Theseus, the hero joined Heracles in his expedition or went on a separate expedition later, and was the one who had the encounter with Hippolyta. Some versions say he abducted her, some that Heracles did the abducting but gave her to Theseus as spoils, and others say that she fell in love with Theseus and betrayed the Amazons by willingly leaving with him. In any case, she was taken to Athens where she was wed to Theseus. In some renditions, the other Amazons became enraged at the marriage and attacked Athens. This was the Attic War, in which they were defeated by Athenian forces under Theseus or Heracles. In other renditions, Theseus later put Hippolyta aside to marry Phaedra. So Hippolyta rallied her Amazons to attack the wedding ceremony. When the defenders closed the doors on the attackers, either Hippolyta was killed, Theseus directly killed her in the fight, she was accidentally killed by another Amazon, Molpadia, while fighting by Theseus' side, or was accidentally killed by her sister Penthesilea during this battle or in a separate incident. This killer was in turn slain by Theseus or Achilles. Some stories paint Theseus in a more favorable light, saying that Hippolyta was dead before he and Phaedra were wed, and this battle did not occur. Further complicating the narratives, several ancient writers say the Amazon in question was not Hippolyta at all, but her sister Antiope, Melanippe, or Glauce. Moreover, there are combined versions of the tale in which Heracles abducts and kills Hippolyta while Theseus, assisted by Sthenelus and Telamon, abducts and marries Antiope. There are also stories that Hippolyta or Antiope later bore Theseus a son, Hippolytus of Athens.

== Shakespeare character ==
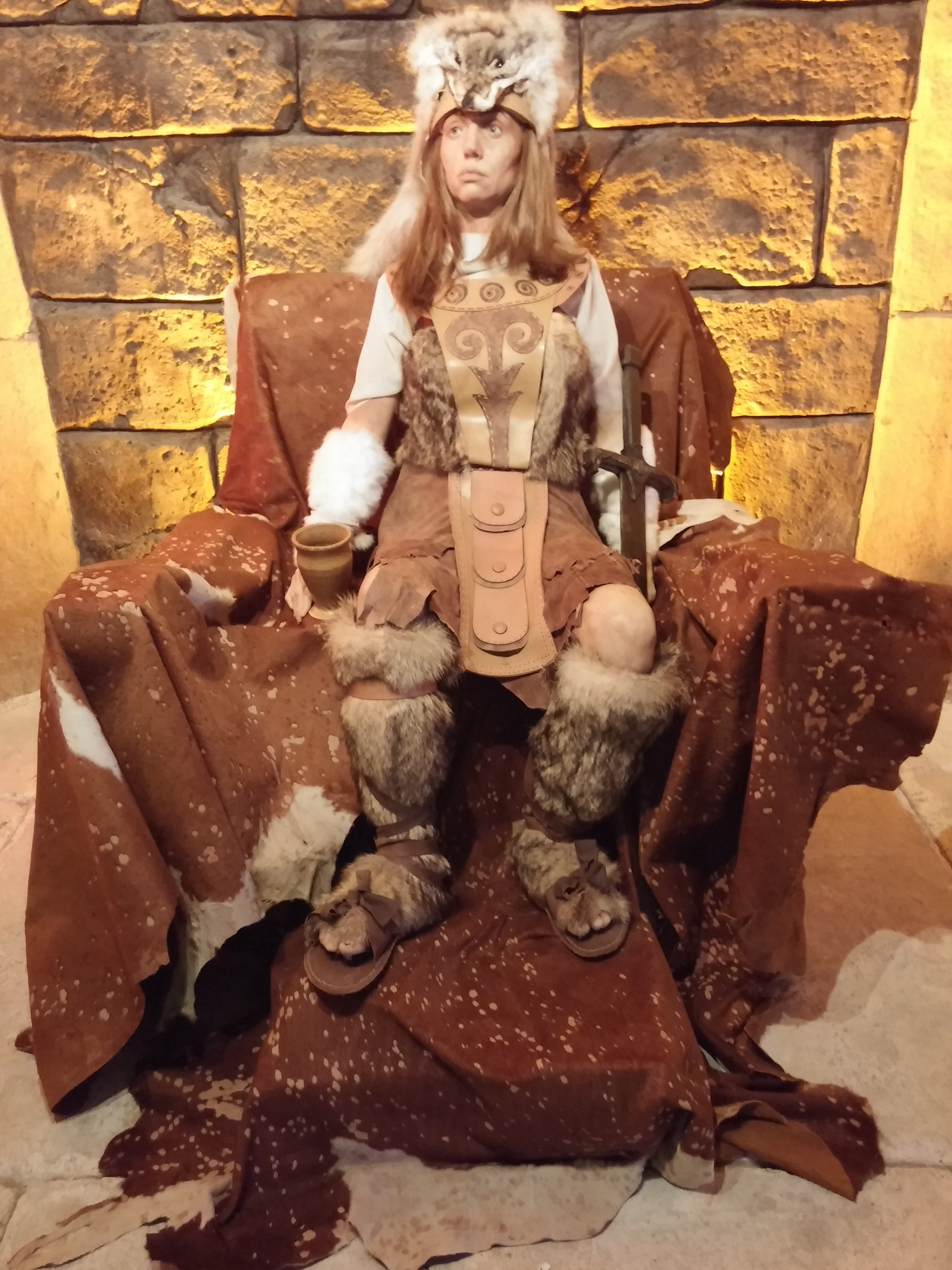
A wax sculpture of Hippolyta at Samsun

In William Shakespeare's A Midsummer Night's Dream, Hippolyta is engaged to Theseus, the duke of Athens. In Act I, Scene 1, Theseus and Hippolyta discuss their fast-approaching wedding, which will take place under the new moon in four days (I.i.2). Theseus declares to Hippolyta that, although he "wooed her with his sword," he will wed her "with pomp, with triumph, and with revelling" and promises to begin a celebration that will continue until the wedding (I.i.19).

The characterization of Hippolyta in A Midsummer Night's Dream (as well as that of Theseus), like many other mytho-historical characters found in Shakespeare's plays, is based on ancient biographical accounts found in Plutarch's work Parallel Lives. In The Life of Theseus, according to Plutarch, it was Hippolyta who concluded a four month long war between Athens and the Amazons with a peace treaty, resulting in the marriage between Theseus and Hippolyta. The representation of Hippolyta and Theseus in A Midsummer Night's Dream appears to be the playwright's invention.

The character Hippolyta appears in The Two Noble Kinsmen, a play co-written by Shakespeare and John Fletcher.

== Other literary treatments ==
She is an important character in The Bull from the Sea, the second novel in Mary Renault's treatment of the legend of Theseus.

She is also an important character in The Rape of the Belt, a play and TV adaptation, a somewhat tongue-in-cheek treatment of Heracles' ninth labour.

== Classical literature sources ==
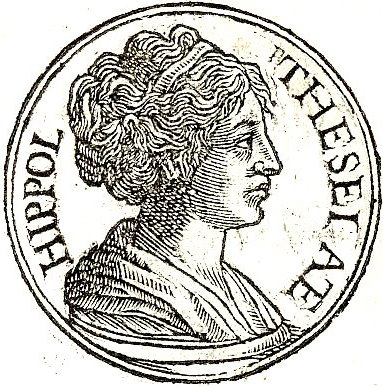
Hippolyta from Promptuarii Iconum Insigniorum

Chronological listing of classical literature sources for Hippolyte's belt:

- Homer, Iliad 2. 649 ff (trans. Murray) (Greek epic poetry C8th BC)
- Euripides, Heracles Mad, 408 ff (trans. Coleridge) (Greek tragedy C5th BC)
- Euripides, Ion, 1143 ff (trans. Way)
- Euripides, Histories, 214 ff (trans. Coleridge)
- Herodotus, Histories 4. 9-10 (trans. Godley) (Greek history C5th BC)
- Herodotus, Historiae 4. 82
- Apollonius Rhodius, The Argonautica 2. 750 ff (trans. Coleridge) (Greek epic poetry C3rd BC)
- Apollonius Rhodius, The Argonautica 2. 777 ff
- Apollonius Rhodius, The Argonautica 2. 966 ff
- Lycophron, Alexandria 1327 ff (trans. Mair) (Greek epic poetry C3rd BC)
- Diodorus Siculus, Library of History 2. 46. 3-4 (trans. Oldfather) (Greek history C1st BC)
- Diodorus Siculus, Library of History 4. 16. 1–4
- Philippus of Thessalonica, The Twelve Labors of Hercules (The Greek Classics ed. Miller Vol 3 1909 p. 397) (Greek epigram C1st AD)
- Seneca, Agamemnon 848 ff (trans. Miller) (Roman tragedy C1st AD)
- Seneca, Hercules Furens 245 ff (trans. Miller)
- Seneca, Hercules Furens 542 ff
- Seneca, Hercules Oetaeus 21 ff (trans. Miller)
- Seneca, Hercules Oetaeus 1183 ff
- Seneca, Hercules Oetaeus 1450 ff
- Seneca, Hercules Oetaeus 1894 ff
- Plutarch, Theseus 26 ff (trans. Perrin) (Greek history C1st to C2nd AD)
- Pseudo-Apollodorus, The Library 2. 5. 9 (trans. Frazer) (Greek mythography C2nd AD)
- Pausanias, Description of Greece 5. 10. 9 (trans. Jones) (Greek travelogue C2nd AD)
- Pseudo-Hyginus, Fabulae 30 (trans. Grant) (Roman mythography C2nd AD)
- Quintus Smyrnaeus, Fall of Troy 6. 240 ff (trans. Way) (Greek epic poetry C4th AD)
- Nonnus, Dionysiaca 25. 148 ff (trans. Rouse) (Greek epic poetry C5th AD)
- Nonnos, Dionysiaca 25. 242 ff
- John Tzetzes, Chiliades or Book of Histories 2. 309 ff (trans. Untila et al.) (Grec-Byzantine history C12 AD)
- Tzetzes, Chiliades or Book of Histories 2. 497 ff

Preceded by Otrera	Queen of the Amazons	Succeeded by Penthesilea
