= Carystus (disambiguation) =

Carystus may refer to:

- Carystus, a very ancient polis (city-state) on the south coast of Euboea, now Karystos
- Carystus (or Karystos), a small modern coastal town on the Greek island of Euboea
- Carystus (Liguria), an ancient town in Liguria, north of Genoa in the territory of Statellae
- Carystus (mythology), the eponym of the town of Carystus on Euboea
- Carystus (skipper), a genus of skipper butterflies in the family Hesperiidae

== See also ==
- Carystius
