= Petraeus (mythology) =

Leader of the satyrs in Ancient Greek mythology

In Greek mythology, Petraeus or Petraios (Ancient Greek: Πετραίῳ, lit. 'of a rock') may refer to three separate characters:

- Poseidon, who was given the term as an epithet.
- Petraeus, the "laughing tippling" leader of the satyrs who joined the army of Dionysus in his campaign against India.
- Petraeus, son of Carystus (son of Chiron) and father of Zarex, adopted father of Anius.
