= Epacria =

Coordinates: 38°07′30″N 23°37′30″E

Epacria or Epakria (Ancient Greek: Ἐπακρία) was one of the twelve districts of ancient Attica, and subsequently, as appears from an inscription, a deme near Plotheia and Halae Araphenides. As the name of a district, it was probably synonymous with Diacria. An ancient grammarian describes the district of Epacria as bordering upon that of the Tetrapolis of Marathon.

It is located in northeastern Attica.
