= Solygeia (Corinthia) =

Coordinates: 37°50′37″N 22°58′00″E

Solygeia (Ancient Greek: Σολύγεια) was a settlement belonging to ancient Corinthia. It was located on a hill called Solygeius (Σολύγειος) located 12 stadia from the shore, and dominated the coast between two promontories called Chersonesus and Rheitus.

== History ==
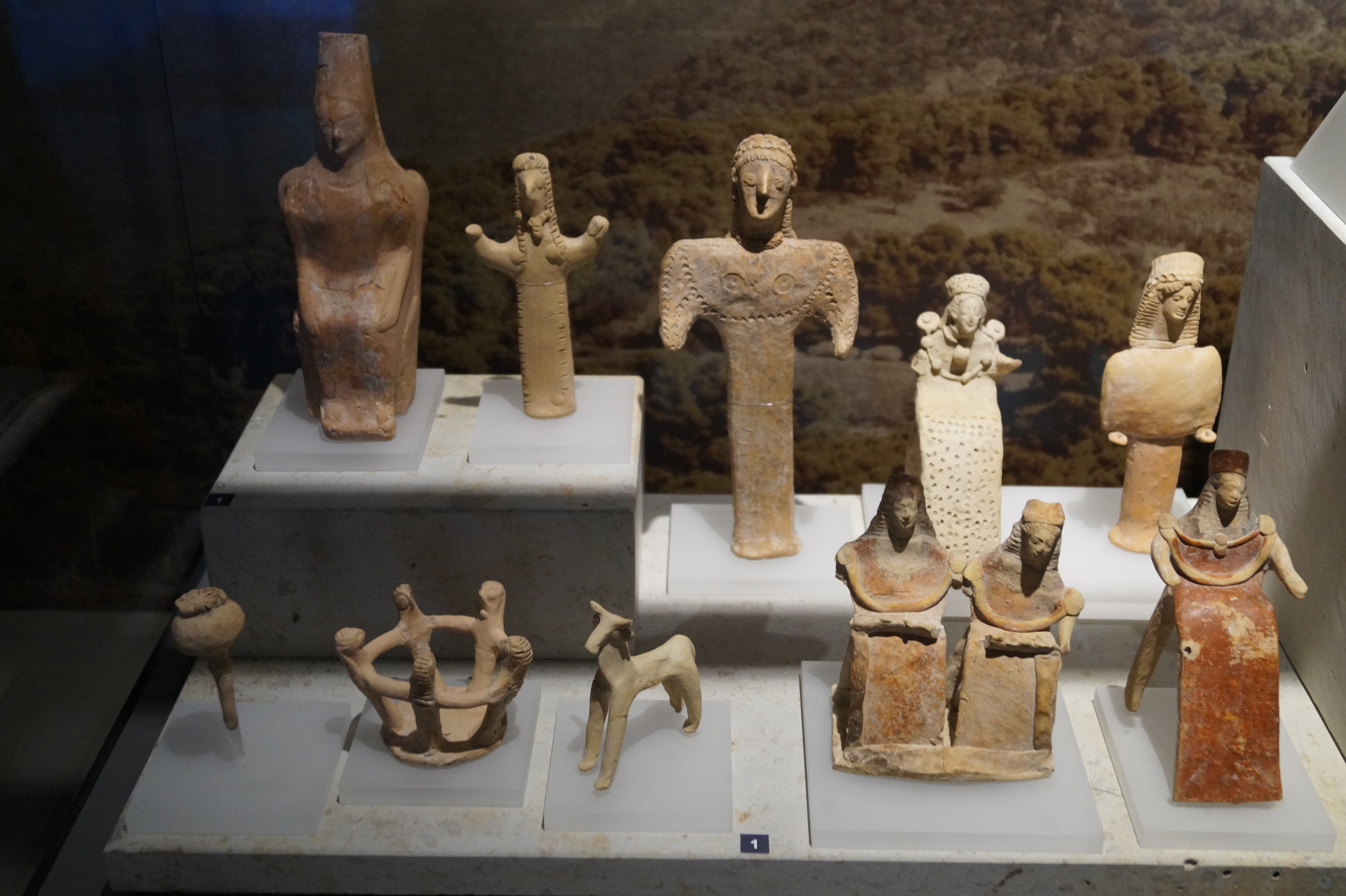
Finds from Solygeia

According to Thucydides, Dorians had seized the hill on which Solygeia sat, to carry on war against the Aeolian inhabitants of Corinthians. During the Peloponnesian War, in the year 425 BCE, Solygeia was the scene of a confrontation between Athens and Corinth. The Athenians had undertaken an expedition against Corinth led by, among others, Nicias, with 80 triremes, 2000 hoplites, and 200 horsemen. They were accompanied by allies from Miletus, Andros and Carystus and landed in the territory dominated by Solygeia. The Corinthians, having had early intimation from Argos of the intended invasion, came in good time to the defense. The Corinthians, led by Battus and Lycophron, went to protect the village of Solygeia, which had no walls, and attacked the Athenians. After a long confrontation in which the Corinthians took the worst part, reinforcements arrived in support of the Corinthians and the Athenians were forced to re-embark. Thucydides offers a balance of 212 dead among the Corinthians, including Lycophron, and about 50 among the Athenians. According to Polyaenus, the Athenians employed a ploy consisting of first disembarking a part of their troops who hid and when the Corinthians came to try to avoid the disembarkation of the others, those who had disembarked ambushed the Corinthians opposing the remainder of the landings, causing great losses to the Corinthians.

Its site is located near the modern Galataki.
