= Plotheia =

Coordinates: 38°07′35″N 23°52′36″E

Plotheia (Ancient Greek: Πλώθεια) was a deme of ancient Attica and appears to have belonged to the district of Epacria, and to have been not far from Halae Araphenides. It was noted for its festival celebrating the hero Pandion.

Its site is located south of modern Stamata.
