= Araphen =

- Ἀραφήν (Ancient Greek)
- Interactive map of Araphen
- 38°01′12″N 24°00′06″E
- Type: Deme
- Periods: Archaic Greek
- Satellite of: Athens, Aigeis tribe, trittys of Paralia
- Location: Rafina, Attica, Greece
- Region: Attica

Araphen (Ancient Greek: Ἀραφήν, romanized: Araphén) was the name of a deme of ancient Athens, situated on the eastern coast to the north of Brauron and Halae Araphenides, on the west of the current village of Rafina, located near the mouth of the river of the same name.

The area was already inhabited in the Archaic Period and was flourishing due to the port which gave access to the Cyclades islands. Two settlements of that period were found on a hill two kilometers south of the port; now there remain a few archaeological finds, which were buried by modern constructions.

== Sources ==
- Lohmann, Hans. "Araphen". Brill's New Pauly.
