= Hippe =

Daughter of Chiron in Greek mythology

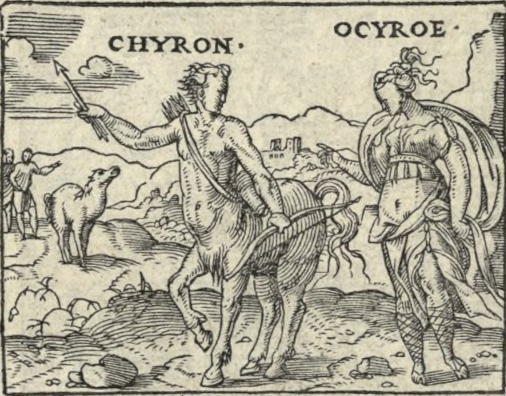
- Chiron and Ocyrhoe, 16th century woodcut.
- Other names: Hippo, Evippe, Melanippe, Ocyrhoe
- Abode: Mount Helicon, Mount Parnassus

Genealogy
- Parents: Chiron and Chariclo
- Siblings: Endeïs, Carystus, Aristaeus
- Consort: Aeolus
- Children: Melanippe

In Greek mythology, Hippe (Ancient Greek: Ancient Greek: Ἵππη, lit. 'mare' or 'horse'; pronounced /ˈhɪpi/, Hip-pay), also known as Hippo, Melanippe, Euippe or Ocyrhoe, was the daughter of the Centaur Chiron, known for being transformed into a mare and becoming the constellation Pegasus.

== Names and etymology ==
Many of the names under which Hippe is known are horse-related, such as Hippe, Hippo and Melanippe (Ancient Greek: Μελανίππη, romanized: Melaníppē, lit. 'black mare').

Julius Pollux, while describing Greek theater masks, mentioned a mask representing the daughter of Chiron during her transformation into a horse, and gives her name as Euippe (Ancient Greek: Εὐίππη, romanized: Euíppē, lit. 'good mare').

In Ovid's account, Hippe is called Ocyrhoe (Ancient Greek: Ὠκυρόη, romanized: Ōkyróē, lit. 'swift-flowing'), from ὠκῠ́ς (ōkŭ́s, “swift, fast”) and ῥέω (rhéō, “to flow”). In the Metamorphoses, the name parallels the flood of words spoken by the daughter of Chiron, whose inability to stop before revealing too much led to her transformation.

In the 15th century, Nicolaus Perotti transmitted what appears to be a corruption of the account attributed to the Pseudo-Hyginus, in which she is called "Thea" and her upbringing is placed on Mount Pelion. In the Pseudo-Hyginus, she is named Thetis and is raised on Mount Helicon. The etymology of Thetis is unclear.

== Mythology ==
According to Ovid's Metamorphoses, Chariclo names her daughter "Ocyrhoe" because she gives birth to her on the banks of a swift-flowing stream. Ocyrhoe learns the arts taught by her father, Chiron, but also possesses the gift of prophecy. Upon seeing Chiron with the young Asclepius, she is overcome with prophetic frenzy and foretells the future deaths of both. Before she can complete her prophecy, she is transformed into a horse, silenced by divine punishment to prevent her from revealing more. As a mare, she gains a new name (implied to be Hippe, "mare").

Two lost tragedies from Euripides, Melanippe Wise and Melanippe Captive, recount the life of Melanippe, Hippe's daughter (also known as Arne). She mentions her mother's story:

My name is Melanippe; Chiron’s daughter bore me to Aeolus. Now Zeus gave her a coat of tawny horse-hair because she sang oracular songs to men, telling them cures and ways to relieve their pains; and driven in a dense squall of mist she left the Corycian mountain, her place of inspiration. This young prophetess is called by men Hippo because of her change of body.

— Melanippe, in Euripides, Melanippe Wise, fragment 481

According to the Pseudo-Hyginus' De Astronomia, Euripides relates in his play that Chiron's daughter was initially named Thetis, and that she was raised on Mount Helicon and fond of hunting. She was seduced by Aeolus, son of Hellen and became pregnant, but was ashamed to tell her father. She fled into the forest to give birth, not wanting him to find out the truth. Chiron went looking for her, and she begged the gods not to let her father see her giving birth. After the child was born, the gods turned her into a mare and placed her among the stars, in the constellation Pegasus, originally called the Horse.

Hyginus adds that in some other accounts, she was a prophetess that was changed into a mare for revealing the secrets of the gods to men, and that, according to Callimachus, she was transformed by the goddess Diana because she had stopped hunting and worshipping her. As a constellation, she is away from the Centaurus constellation, representing Chiron, as she was avoiding her father, and is depicted as the forepart of a horse, the hindquarters being concealed to obscure her sex.
