= Marmarium =

Ancient town of Euboea

Coordinates: 38°02′56″N 24°19′15″E

Marmarium or Marmarion (Ancient Greek: Μαρμάριον) was a town of ancient Euboea. According to Strabo, Marmarium was situated on the coast near Carystus, opposite Halae Araphenides in Attica. The quarries at Marmarium produced a celebrated green marble, with white zones – the Cipollino marble of the Romans.

Its site is located near the modern village of Marmari.
