= Dolops =

Set of mythological Greek characters

In Greek mythology, the name Dolops (Ancient Greek: Δόλοψ, pronounced [ˈdó.lops]) may refer to:

- Dolops, a son of Cronus and the Oceanid Philyra, brother of Chiron.
- Dolops, son of Hermes, who died in the city of Magnessa. His tomb was located at the seashore; the Argonauts stopped by it for two days, waiting for the stormy weather to be over, and offered sacrifices to him.
- Dolops the Achaean, son of Clytius, killed by Hector in the Trojan War.
- Dolops the Trojan, son of Lampus. In the Iliad, he confronted Meges in a battle and could have killed him if not for Meges' strong corselet; as Meges fought back, Menelaus attacked Dolops from behind and killed him, whereupon the Greeks removed his armor.
- Dolops of Lemnos, father of the shepherd Iphimachus who took care of the abandoned Philoctetes.

== Other uses ==
- Dolops (crustacean) - a genus of fish lice in the family Argulidae
