= Pandion (hero) =

Eponymous hero of the Pandionis

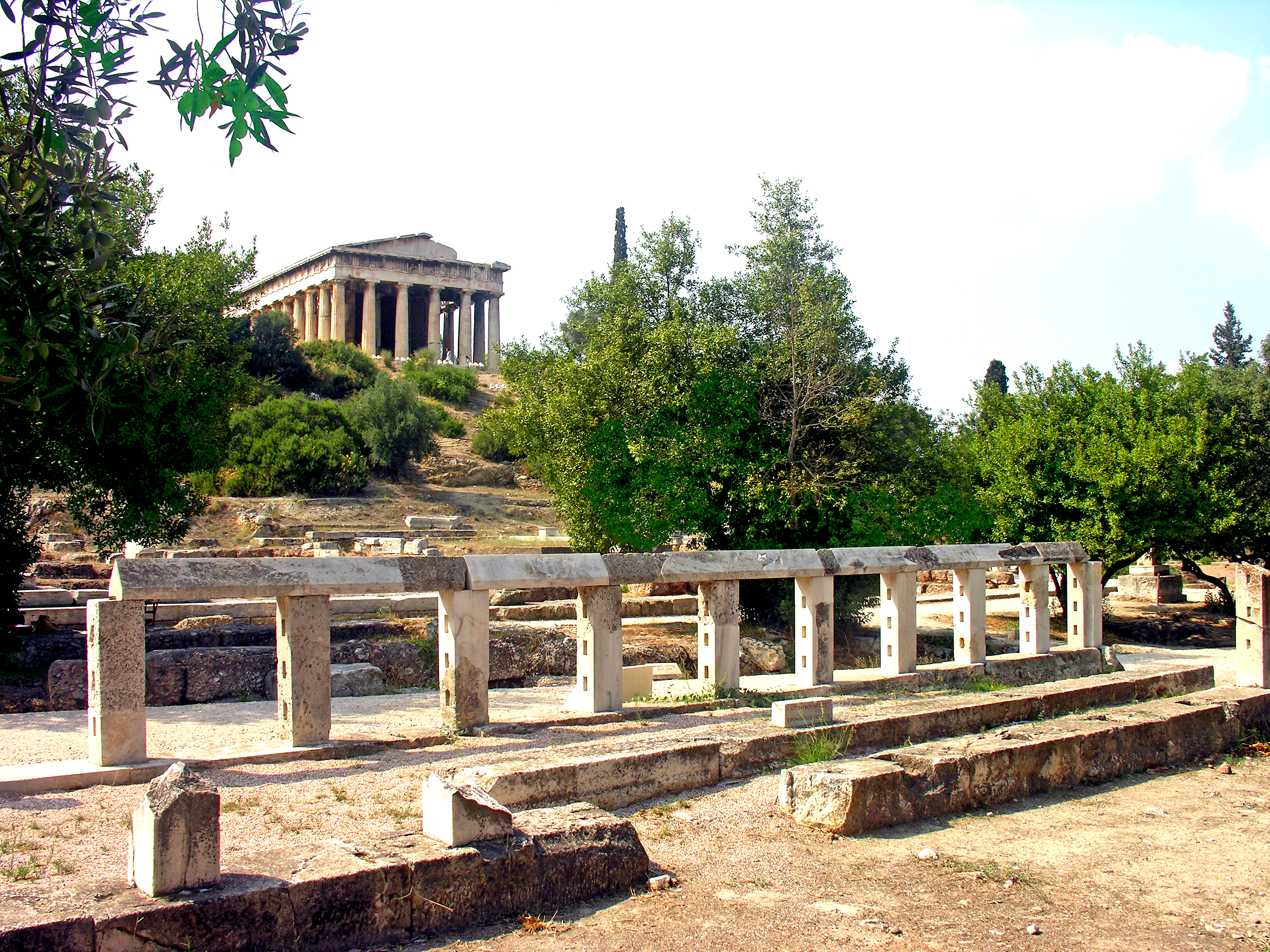
Remains of the Monument of Eponymous Heroes in the Ancient Agora of Athens.

Pandion (/ˈpændiən/ or /ˈpændiɒn/; Ancient Greek: Πανδίων) was the eponymous hero of the Attic tribe Pandionis, which was created as part of the tribal reforms of Cleisthenes at the end of the sixth century BC. He is usually assumed to be one of the two legendary kings of Athens, Pandion I or Pandion II.

== Pandion I and II ==
The relationship between Pandion, the eponymous hero, and the two legendary Athenian kings Pandion I and Pandion II is unclear, but most sources assume that the hero was one or the other of these two kings. The situation is further complicated by the fact that either Pandion I or Pandion II may have been invented to fill a gap in the mythical history of Athens, and that originally there may have been only one Pandion.

Demosthenes' Funeral Oration (338 BC) makes the father of the famous sisters Procne and Philomela—usually considered to be Pandion I—the eponymous hero of the Pandionidae. However, the 2nd century AD geographer Pausanias does not know which king Pandion was honored as the eponymous hero, and Pausanias makes Pandion II the father of Procne and Philomela.

== Cult ==
Pandion had a heroön (hero shrine) on the Acropolis of Athens, where Pausanias reports seeing a statue of Pandion. Pandion was also honored with a statue (along with the other tribal heroes) at the Monument of the Eponymous Heroes in the Ancient Agora.

Pandion was probably associated in some way with the ancient Athenian festival Pandia, and it is possible that the festival derived its name from Pandion. However, the festival was probably held in honor of Zeus, and some scholars think it is more likely that the hero derived his name from the festival as its legendary founder. This would be consistent with what Kearns describes as "a wide spread cultic-mythic phenomenon in which a hero or heroine is worshipped in conjunction with a god, while an aetiological myth explains that he or she was the first to perform the rite." An inscription dating from c. 386 BC, which refers to a decree of the tribe Pandionis, commending a "priest of Pandion" for services performed at the Pandia, supports the notion of a link between Pandion and the festival.

Pandion may also have been associated with a festival attested for the deme Plotheia also called the Pandia; what relationship if any this festival may have had with the Pandia of Athens is unknown.

According to Pausanias the hero Pandion was also honored in Megara where he had a monument in the city and a tomb in the cave of Athena Aithyia.
