= Chariclo =

Nymphs in Greek mythology

Chariclo (Ancient Greek: Χαρικλώ, romanized: Khariklṓ or Khariklô, lit. 'graceful spinner' or 'graceful fame', pronounced [kʰa.ri.klɔ̌ː]) was either of two nymphs in Greek mythology:

- Chariclo, a nymph who was married to the centaur Chiron and became the mother of Hippe, Endeïs, Ocyrhoe, and Carystus. According to a scholium on Pindar, she was the daughter of either Apollo, Perses or Oceanus. Chariclo together with her mother-in-law Philyra the Oceanid, were the nurses of the young Achilles.
- Chariclo, a nymph devotee of Athena, who became pregnant by a shepherd, Everes, giving birth to the prophet Tiresias. Tiresias was struck blind by Athena after seeing her naked. Chariclo begged Athena to give Tiresias his sight back, but the goddess could not undo her curse. She gave him the gift of prophecy instead.
