= Zarex =

Greek mythological character

Zarex (Ancient Greek: Ζάρηξ) or Zarax (Ζάραξ) is the name of a hero of ancient Greek mythology, son of Carystus (Carycus) or by the latter's son Petraeus.

== Family ==
Zarex married Rhoeo, and became the father of Anius and four other children. In some accounts, Zarex adopted his wife's son, Anius, who was raised by his divine father Apollo.

== Mythology ==
Zarex was credited with having learned the music of Apollo, and having founded the town of Zarex in Laconia; he also had a heroon at Eleusis, next to that of Hippothoon. There also was a mountain on Euboea thought to be named after him.

Pausanias wrote that there may was also another Zarex, an Athenian hero, but he had nothing to say concerning him.

== See also ==
- Naming citation for Jovian asteroid 18060 Zarex
