= Philyra (Oceanid) =

Greek mythological figure

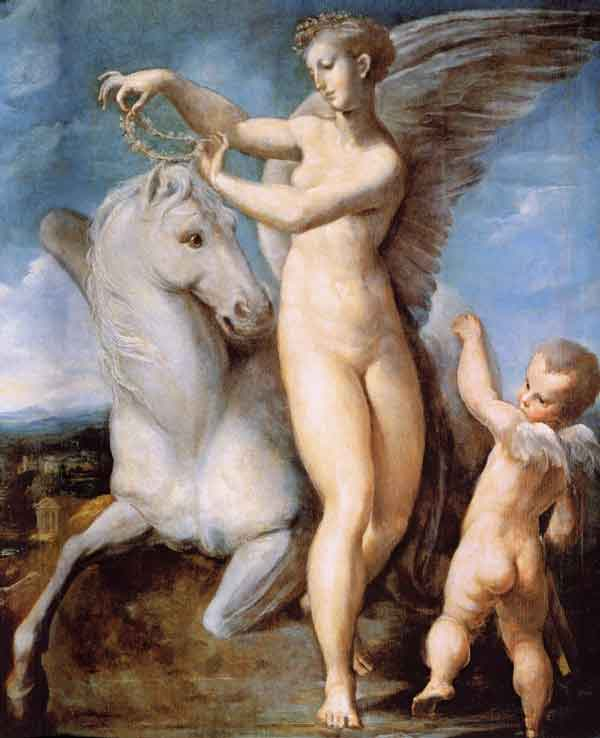
Philyra e Saturno, by Parmigianino, oil on panel, 16th century

In Greek mythology, Philyra or Phillyra (Ancient Greek: Φιλύρα, romanized: Philýra, lit. 'linden-tree'; pronounced /ˈfɪlərə/ or /fɪˈlaɪrə/, fih-LYE-rah or FIL-uh-ruh; or /fɪˈliːrə/, fee-LEE-rah) was one of the 3,000 Oceanids, water-nymph daughters of the Titans Oceanus and Tethys.

== Mythology ==
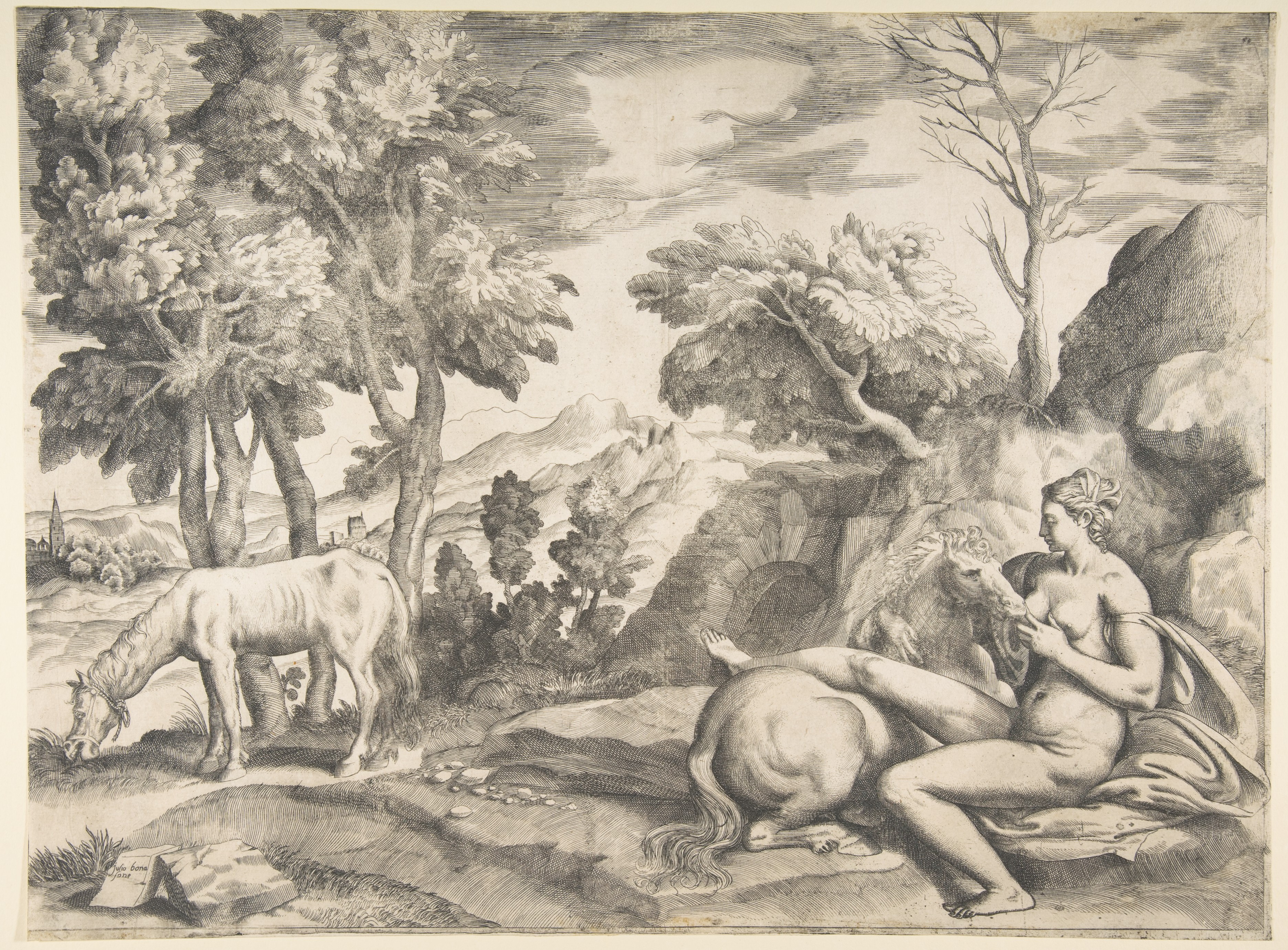
Saturn in the guise of a horse being suckled by the nymph Philyra, engraving by Giulio Bonasone, circa 1513–1576, Metropolitan Museum of Art.

By the Titan Cronus, Philyra was the mother of the centaur Chiron. Cronus' wife Rhea walked in on them, thereupon Cronus assumed the form of a stallion and galloped away, in order not to be caught by her, hence the half-human, half-equine shape of their offspring; this was said to have taken place on Mount Pelion. When she gave birth to her son, she was so disgusted by how he looked that she abandoned him at birth, and implored the gods to transform her into anything other than anthropomorphic as she could not bear the shame of having had such a monstrous child; the gods (specifically Zeus) changed her into a linden tree.

Yet in some versions Philyra and Chariclo, the wife of Chiron, nursed the young Jason; Chiron's dwelling on Pelion where his disciples were reared was known as "Philyra's cave". Chiron was often referred to by the matronymic Philyrides or the like. Two other sons of Cronus and Philyra may have been Dolops and Aphrus, the ancestor and eponym of the Aphroi, i.e. the native Africans.

== See also ==
- Danae
- Io
- Leda
- Callisto
- Ganymede
