= Carystus =

Polis on ancient Euboea

Coordinates: 38°00′59″N 24°25′13″E

Carystus (/kəˈrɪstəs/; Greek: Κάρυστος, near modern Karystos) was a polis (city-state) on ancient Euboea. It was situated on the south coast of the island, at the foot of Mount Oche. It is mentioned by Homer in the Catalogue of Ships in the Iliad, as controlled by the Abantes. The name also appears in the Linear B tablets as "ka-ru-to" (identified as Carystus). Thucydides writes that the town was founded by Dryopes. According to the legend, its name was derived from Carystus, the son of Cheiron.

== History ==
=== Persian War ===
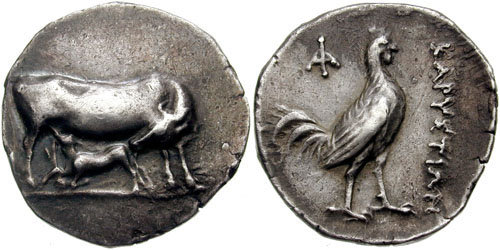
Silver stater of Karystos, 313-265 BC. Obverse: Cow and calf. Reverse: rooster, ΚΑΡΥΣΤΙΩΝ.

In 490 BC, during the Greco-Persian Wars, a Persian Admiral named Datis laid siege to Carystus. Datis began the siege by destroying the crops around the city. His army of 80,000 soldiers with 200 triremes overwhelmed Carystus, causing it to surrender.

Soon after the Battle of Salamis the Athenian fleet led by Themistocles extorted money from the city.

Soon afterward, Carystus refused to join the Delian League. The Athenians wanted Carystus to join the Delian League, but seeming as though it had been under Persian control, they refused. Athens would not accept a refusal, so they attacked and plundered Carystus. This forced Carystus to side with the Delian League. Athens employed this tactic frequently, as it was said to be better for the league. This way, a Greek city-state could not side with Persia and offer its city as a base, and also could not get the advantages of a Persian-free Greece without paying its share. The creation of the Delian League led to the imperial nature of Athens that fueled the Peloponnesian War. Imperial nature tends to take on a modern association; however, with the creation of the league, essentially, people of an uneducated agricultural background were given the right to vote in the assembly. This version of Athenian democracy took on a role that allowed for a tyrannical nature of a seemingly egalitarian ideal. The league demanded submission to create a unified Greece; the only problem is that instead of creating a standing army or improved military strength to prevent further invasion, the Athenians, under the direction of Pericles, started the Periclean building projects that squandered funds and glorified Athens and Greece in their defeat of Persia. This misapplication of tribute from Attican city-states created the rejection of this idea by Sparta, and subsequently the Peloponnesian War, not securing Greece from an outside Persian attack, but opening it for an internal rejection of the league.

Carystus was part of the Euboean Koinon, until the league's final dissolution in 297 by Roman Emperor Diocletian.

=== Further history ===
The Carystians fought on the side of the Athenians in the Lamian War. They espoused the side of the Romans in the war against Philip V of Macedon.

Carystus was chiefly celebrated for its marble, which was in much request at Rome. Strabo places the quarries at Marmarium, a place upon the coast near Carystus, opposite Halae Araphenides in Attica; but the marks of the quarries have been found upon Mt. Oche, where seven entire columns, apparently on the spot where they had been quarried were observed, and at the distance of three miles from the sea. This marble is the Cipollino marble of the Romans – a green marble, with white zones. At Carystus, the mineral asbestos was also obtained, which was hence called the Carystian stone.

== Christian bishopric ==
As an episcopal see, Carystus was initially a suffragan of Corinth, but in the 9th century it came to be associated with Athens and appears as such in the Notitia Episcopatuum composed under Byzantine Emperor Leo VI the Wise (886–912). A bishop of the see called Cyriacus was one of the signatories of the letter of the episcopate of the Corinthian province to Emperor Leo I the Thracian in 458. During the time of Michael Choniates as archbishop of Athens, Carystus and Skyros became separate sees.

No longer a residential bishopric, Carystus is today listed by the Catholic Church as a titular see.

== Notable people ==
- Antigonus (3rd century BC), writer
- Apollodorus (3rd century BC), comic playwright
- Diocles (4th century BC), physician
- Glaucus (6th century BC), boxer

== See also ==
- List of ancient Greek cities

== Bibliography ==
- Groot, M. (2014). "Burned Offerings and Sacrificial Meal in Geometric and Archaic Karystos: Faunal Remains from Plakari (2011–2012)". Pharos. 20 (2): 25–52.
- Keller, D. R. (1985). Archaeological Survey in Southern Euboia, Greece: A Reconstruction of Human Activity from Neolithic Times through the Byzantine Period (PhD). University of Indiana.
- Papamichael, Stamatis (2002). Post-Christian Karystos (in Greek). Ε & Π ΤΑΜΒΑΚΟΣ Ο.Ε. ISBN 960-90995-1-3.
