= Carystus (mythology) =

Carystus or Carystos (Ancient Greek: Κάρυστος, romanized: Kárystos; pronounced /kəˈrɪstəs/ or /kaˈris.tus/, ka-RIS-tus) or Carycus, in Greek mythology, was the son of Chiron and a nymph Chariclo, brother of Hippe, Endeïs and Ocyrhoe. Carystus was the father of Zarex, and also, a certain Aristaeus. In another version of the myth, his son Petraeus was the father of Zarax instead. The town of Carystus on Euboea took the name from him.
