= Chiron =

Centaur from Greek mythology

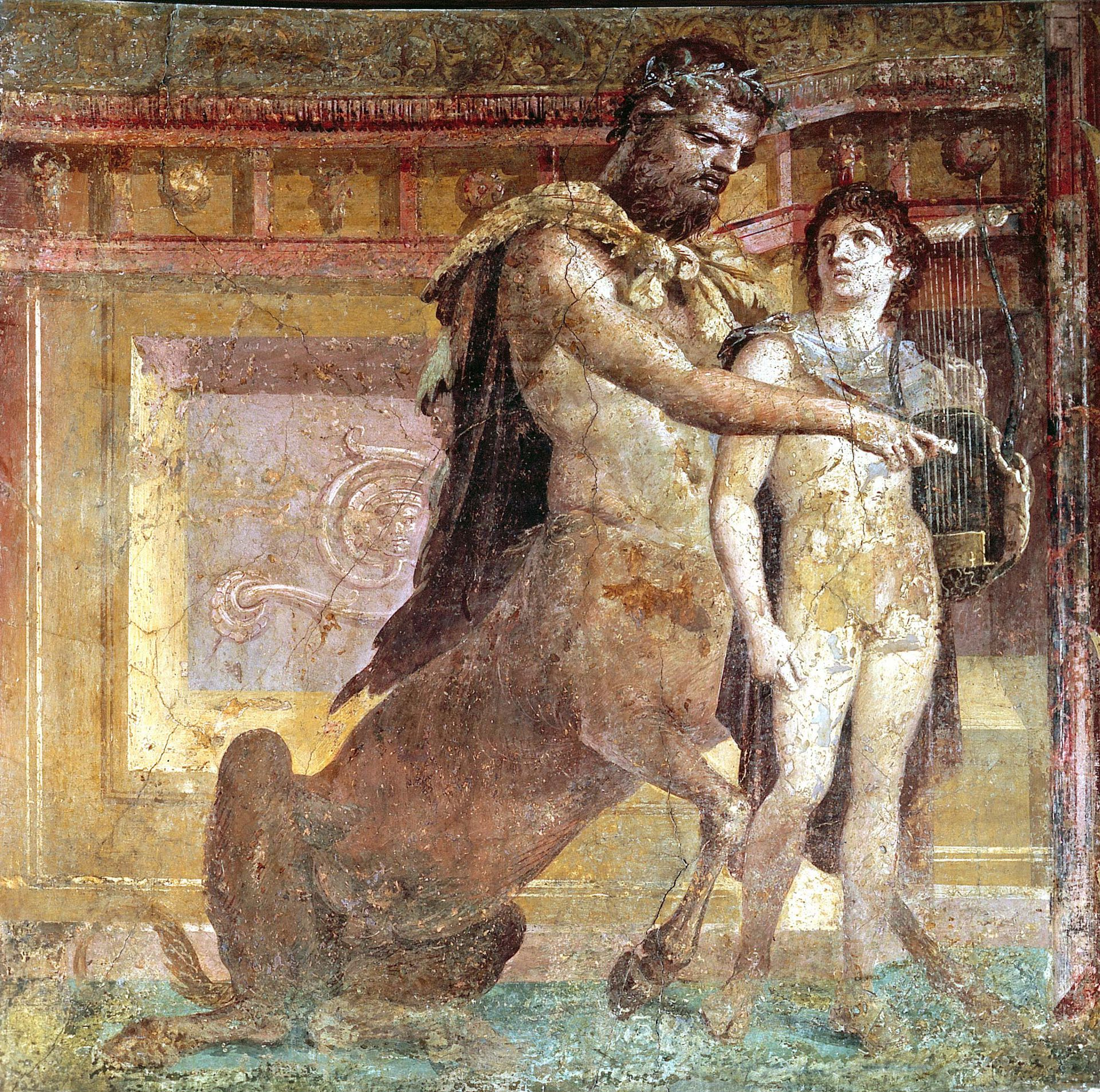
- The Education of Achilles by Chiron, fresco from Herculaneum, 1st century AD (Museo Archeologico Nazionale, Naples)
- Abode: Thessaly

Genealogy
- Parents: Cronus and Philyra
- Siblings: Hestia, Demeter, Hera, Hades, Poseidon, Zeus
- Consort: Chariclo
- Children: Hippe, Endeïs, Ocyrhoe, Carystus, Aristaeus

In Greek mythology, Chiron, also Cheiron or Kheiron, (Ancient Greek: Χείρων, romanized: Kheírōn, lit. 'hand'; pronounced /ˈkaɪrən/ or /ˈkaɪrɒn/, KY-rən, KY-ron, Kye-ron or Kee-ron) was held to be the superlative centaur amongst his brethren since he was called the "wisest and justest of all the centaurs".

== Biography ==
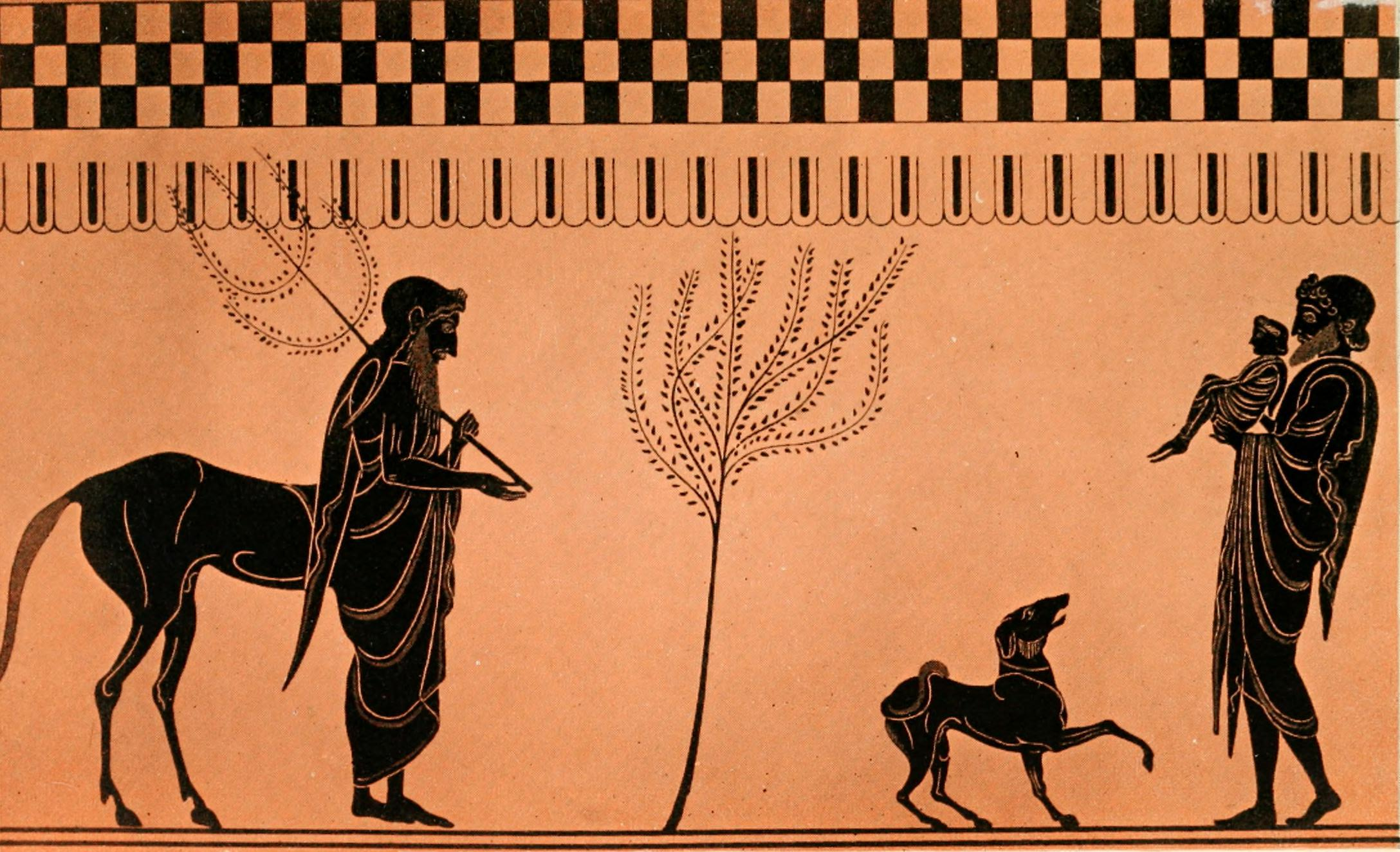
Chiron, Peleus, and infant Achilles

Chiron was notable throughout Greek mythology for his youth-nurturing nature. His personal skills tend to match those of his foster father Apollo, who taught the young centaur the art of medicine, herbs, music, archery, hunting, gymnastics, and prophecy, and made him rise above his beastly nature. Chiron was known for his knowledge and skill with medicine, and thus was credited with the discovery of botany and pharmacy, the science of herbs and medicine.

Like satyrs, centaurs were notorious for being wild, lusty, overly indulgent drinkers and carousers, violent when intoxicated. Chiron, by contrast, was intelligent, civilized, and kind because he was not related directly to the other centaurs due to his parentage. He was the son of the Titan Cronus and the Oceanid Philyra, and thus possible brother to Dolops and Aphrus, the ancestor and eponym of the Aphroi, i.e. the native Africans. Chiron lived predominantly on Mount Pelion; there he married the nymph Chariclo who bore him three daughters, Hippe (also known as Melanippe meaning the "black mare" or Euippe, "good mare"), Endeïs, and Ocyrhoe, and one son Carystus. A different source also stated that his wife was called Nais while a certain Aristaeus was called his son.

Like the other centaurs, Chiron was later expelled by the Lapithae from his home; but sacrifices were offered to him there by the Magnesians until a very late period, and the family of the Cheironidae in that neighbourhood, who were distinguished for their knowledge of medicine, were regarded as his descendants.

== Physical appearance ==
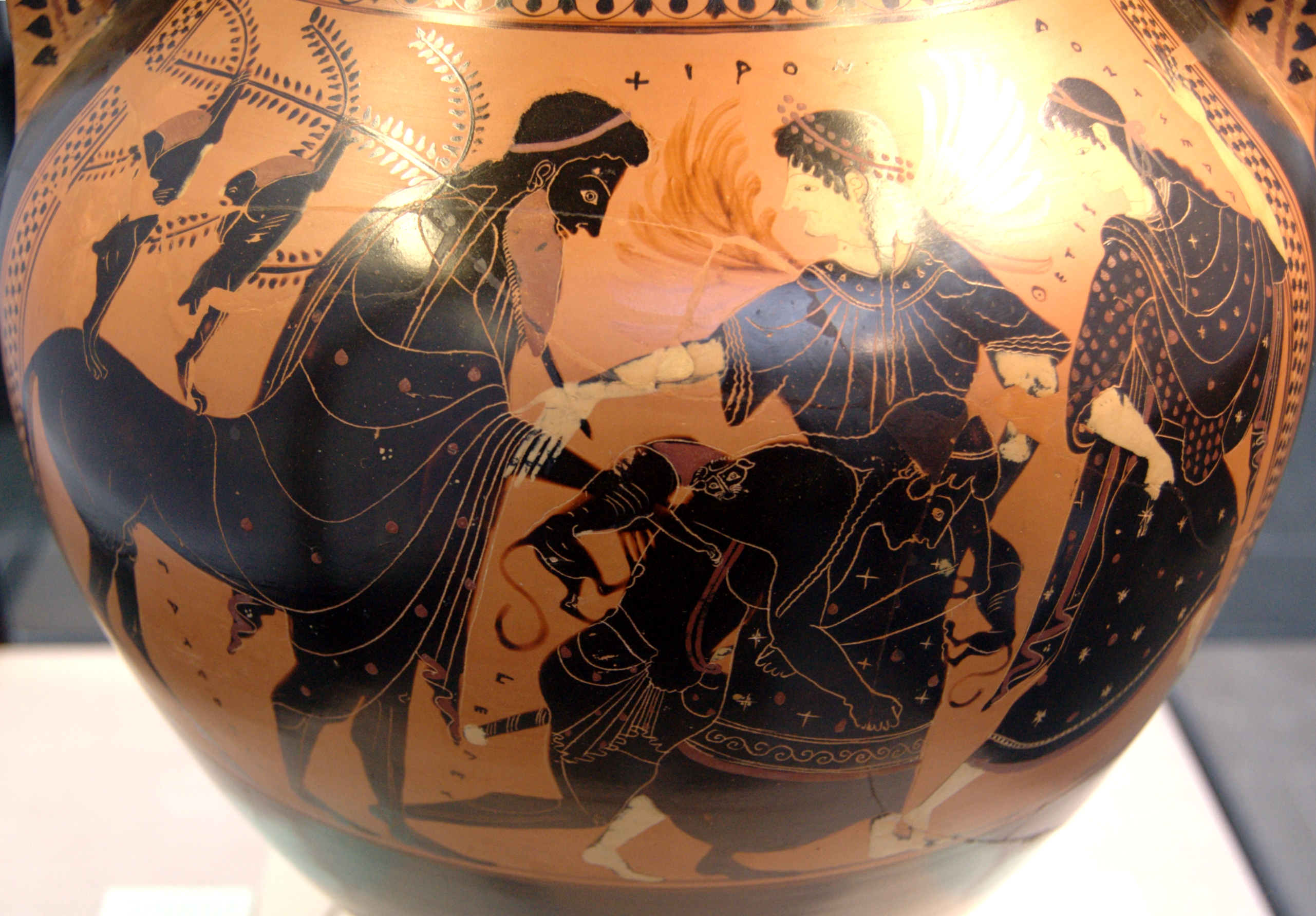
Peleus wrestling Thetis between Chiron and a Nereid. Side B of an Attic black-figure amphora, c. 510 BC.

Although a centaur, Chiron's physical appearance often differs somewhat from other centaurs, demonstrating his status and heritage. In traditional Greek representations of Chiron his front legs are human, rather than equine. This is in contrast to the traditional representation of centaurs, which have the entire lower body of a horse. This clearly sets Chiron apart from the other centaurs, making him easily identifiable. This difference may also have highlighted Chiron's unique lineage, being the son of Cronus. Chiron is often depicted carrying a branch with dead hares he has caught hanging from it. Chiron is also often depicted wearing clothes, demonstrating he is more civilised and unlike a normal centaur (the only other occasional exceptions to this rule are the centaurs Nessus and Pholus).

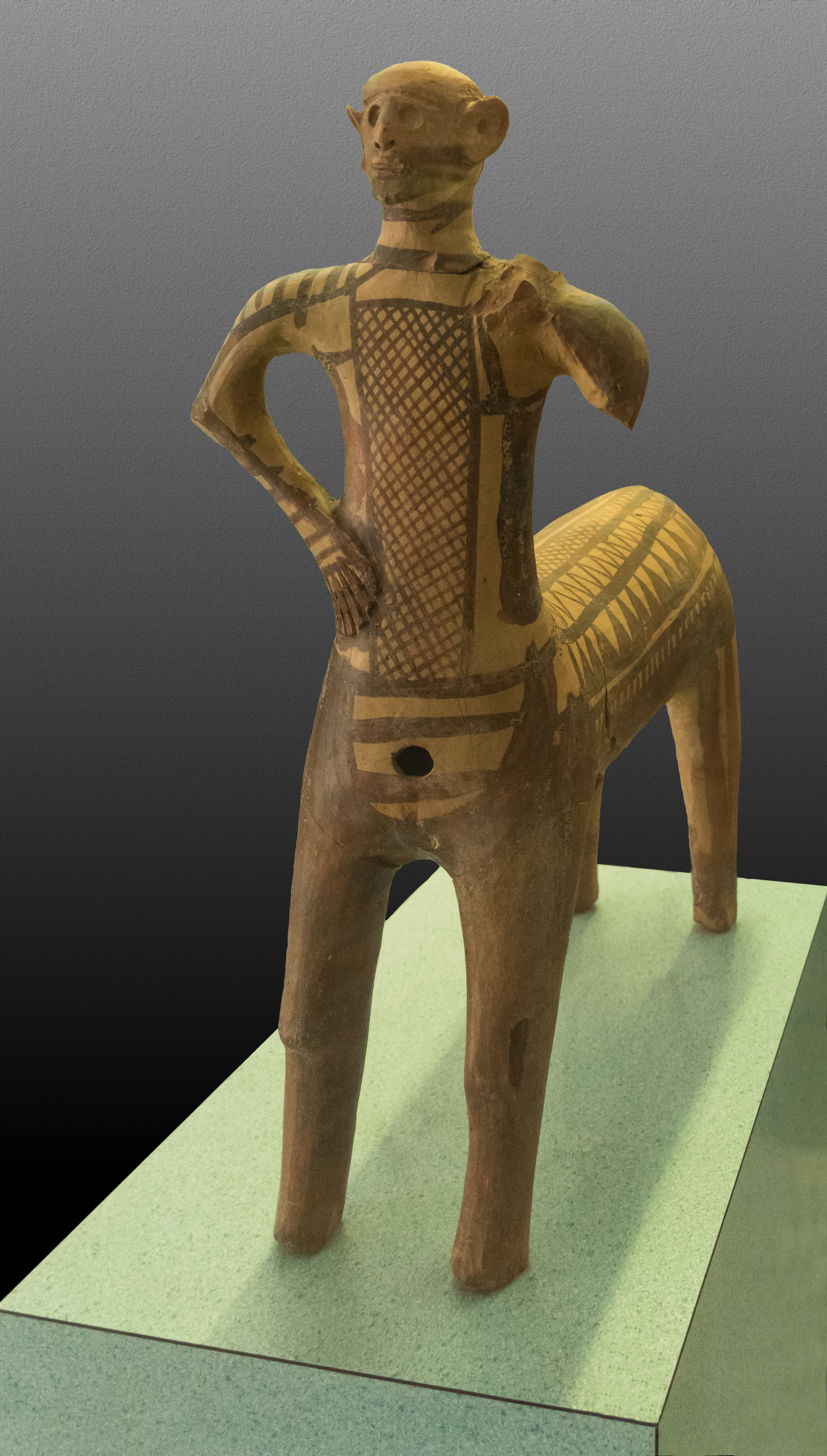
Clay centaur figurine found at Lefkandi, dated to 1050–900 BC and thought to be an early representation of Chiron

The Education of Achilles wall painting, from the basilica in Herculaneum (top right), is one of the most common Roman depictions of Chiron, as he teaches Achilles the lyre. In this version we see Chiron with a fully equine lower body, in contrast to the ancient Greek representations. In addition to this reconfiguration, Chiron's appearance is further altered with his ears. Whereas previously human, Chiron's ears now match those of a satyr; folded over at the top. This rendering creates a more bestial version of Chiron, much more akin to a standard centaur. It may be possible that due to the rise of written sources, Roman artists were inspired by written descriptions of Chiron; simply using the word centaur, rather than having available traditional visual representations. This may, then, not be a deliberate reworking of the Chiron myth on the part of the Romans, but simply a lost nuance of the character in its migration from Greece to Rome. As F. Kelsey writes; "The Chiron of our painting, ... has a body like that of the other centaurs, but the prominence of the human element in his nature is no less marked; he is the wise and gentle teacher, the instructor of an art". Chiron has retained an element of clothing and gained a laurel wreath, suggesting the artist wished to portray nobility, or even divinity, more consistent with the traditional view. It has also been suggested that this fresco is a reproduction of an actual statue in the Roman forum.

== Mythology ==
=== Early years ===
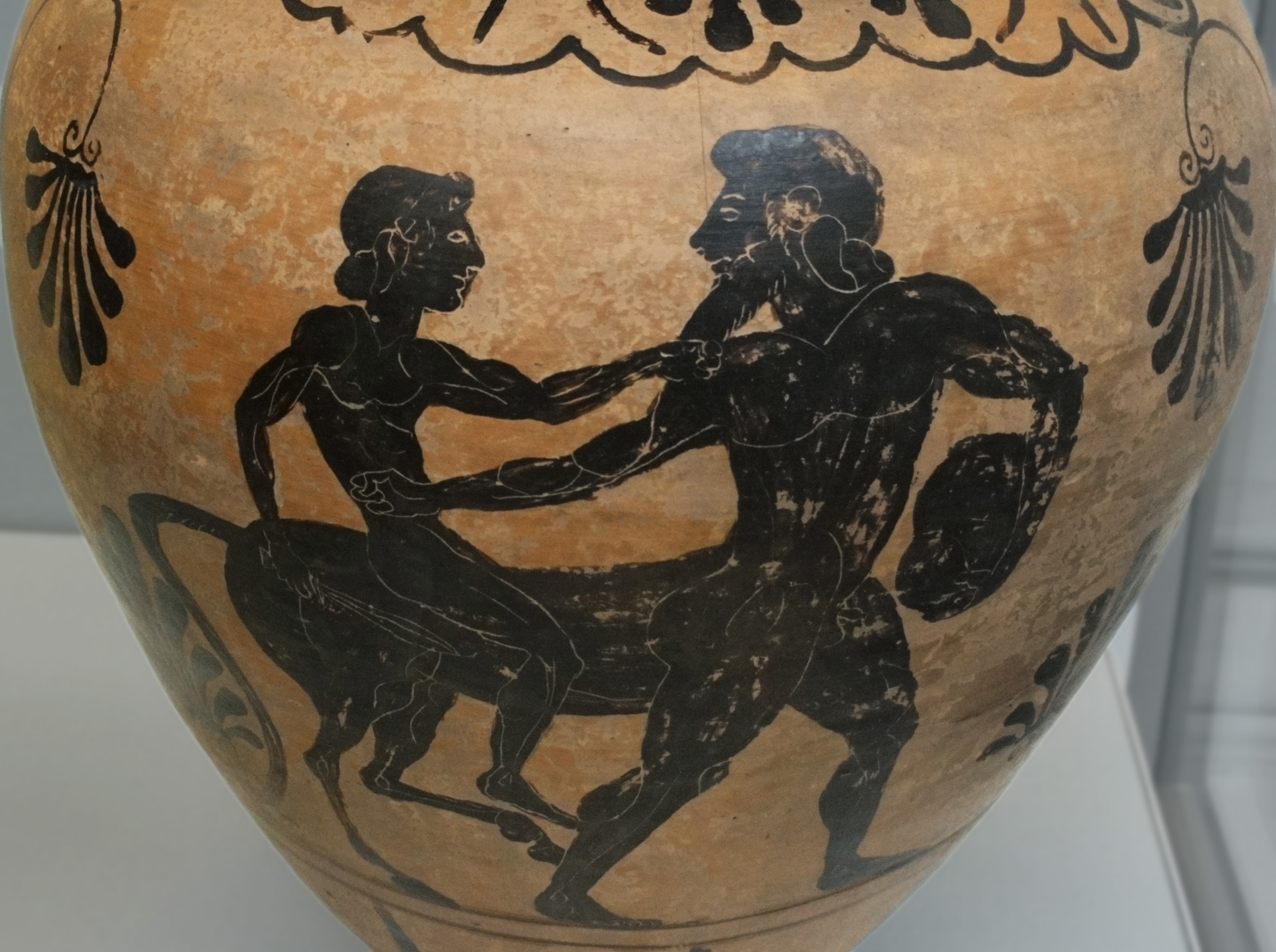
Amphora suggested to be Achilles riding Chiron. British Museum ref 1956,1220.1 .

According to an archaic myth, Chiron was sired by the Titan Cronus when he had taken the form of a horse and impregnated the nymph Philyra. In another version his mother was the nymph Naïs.

Chiron's lineage was different from other centaurs, who were born from Ixion, consigned to a fiery wheel, and Nephele ("cloud"), which in the Olympian telling Zeus invented to look like Hera.

Soon after giving birth to Chiron, Philyra abandoned her child out of shame and disgust. Chiron, effectively orphaned, was later found by the god Apollo, who took him under his wing and taught him the art of music, lyre, archery, medicine and prophecy. Apollo's twin sister, Artemis, trained him in archery and hunting. Chiron's uniquely peaceful character, kindness, and intelligence are attributed to Apollo and Artemis.

Some sources speculate that Chiron was originally a Thessalian god, later subsumed into the Greek pantheon as a centaur.

A great healer, astrologer, and respected oracle, Chiron was said to be the first among centaurs and highly revered as a teacher and tutor. Among his pupils were many culture heroes: Asclepius, Aristaeus, Actaeon, Achilles, Jason, Medus.

There is also a persistent link with Peleus throughout Chiron's myth. This can be explained that the latter was the grandfather of Peleus through his daughter Endeis who married the king of Aegina, Aeacus. Chiron saved the life of Peleus when Acastus tried to kill him by taking his sword and leaving him out in the woods to be slaughtered by the centaurs. Chiron retrieved the sword for Peleus. Chiron then explained to Peleus how to capture the nymph Thetis, leading to their marriage.

Chiron is also connected with the story of the Argonauts, whom he received kindly when they came to his residence on their voyage, for many of the heroes were his friends and pupils.

=== Students ===
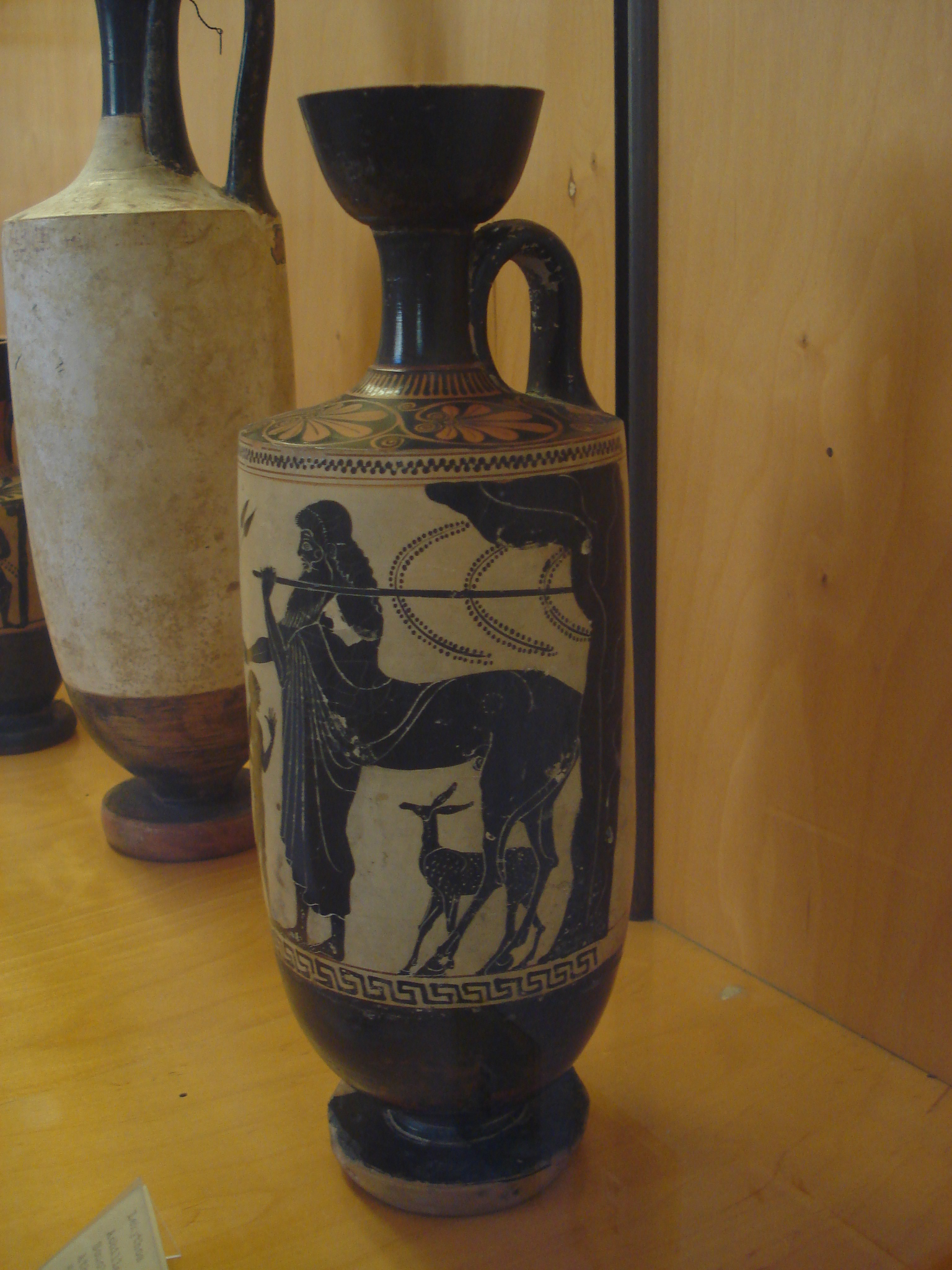
A lekythos depicting Chiron and Achilles

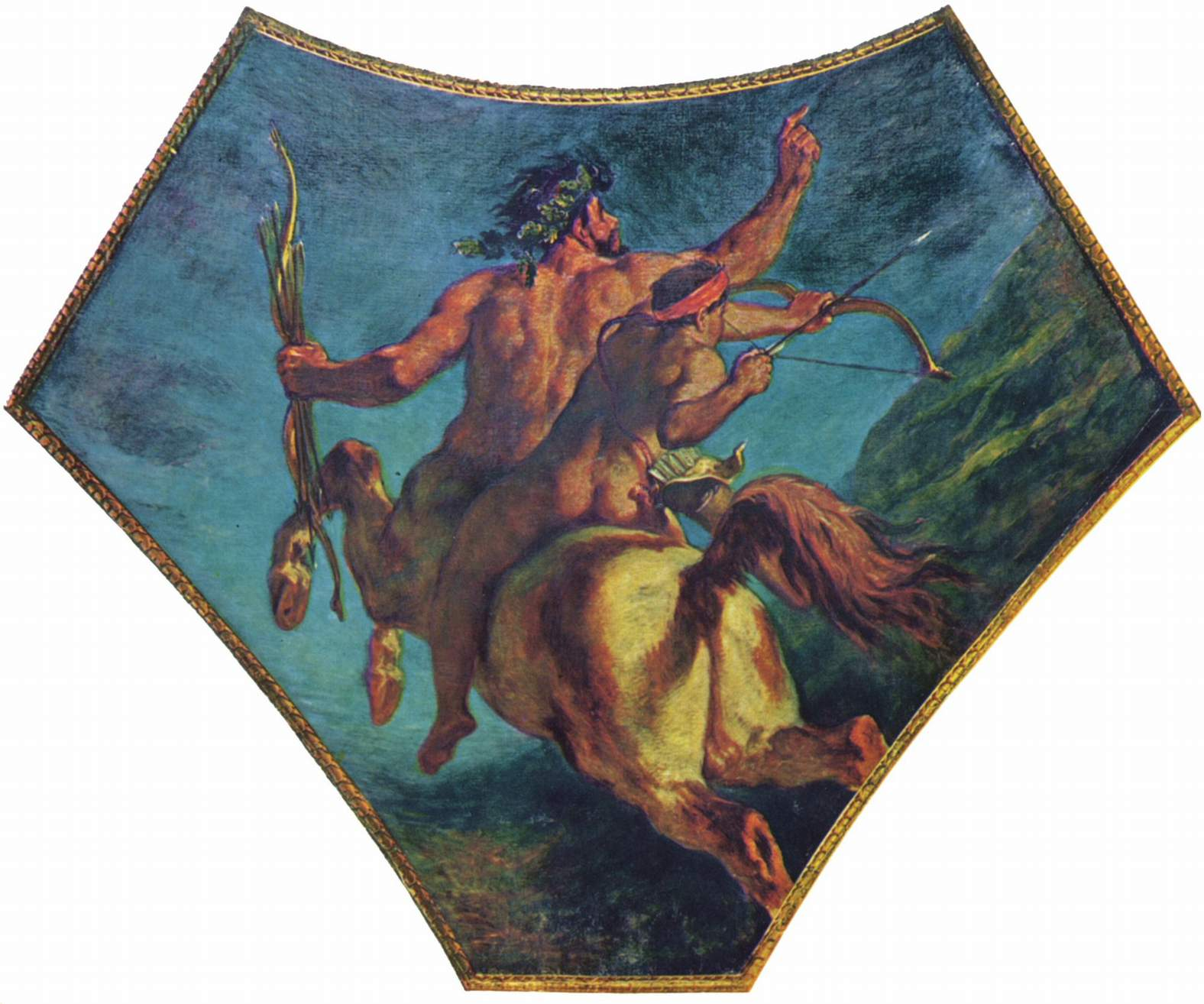
The Education of Achilles, by Eugène Delacroix.

Chiron was a renowned mentor, and brought up some future heroes such as:

- Achilles – The son of the Argonaut Peleus and the Nereid Thetis. Peleus had a friendly relationship with Chiron who had already saved him from Acastus and a band of murderous centaurs, and later restored the sight of Phoenix, a blind friend of Peleus. When Achilles was old enough, Peleus brought him to Chiron, who received him as a disciple, and fed him the innards of lions and boars, and bear marrow. In some accounts, Achilles was previously called "Ligyron", and Chiron gave him his new name. Later in his life, Achilles taught Patroclus what Chiron had taught him, including the medical arts.
- Aristaeus – Although his mother Cyrene lived in Libya, Aristaeus' father Apollo brought him on Mount Pelion to be reared by Chiron. Aristaeus would later become in his life a god of certain rustic arts such as beekeeping and cheesemaking. Moreover, he is the protagonist of a creation myth regarding the Etesian winds.
- Actaeon – The son of Autonoë and Aristeus (an aforementioned student of Chiron). He became an excellent hunter thanks to the centaur's lessons. In his adulthood as he was hunting in the woods, he saw the virgin goddess Artemis bathing. She punished Actaeon for seeing her naked body by turning him into a stag. His hunting dogs did not recognize him and devoured him. Ignorant of what they had done, the hunting dogs came to the cave of Chiron seeking their master and the Centaur fashioned an image of Actaeon in order to soothe their grief.
- Asclepius – The Greek God of Doctors. Artemis killed Asclepius' mother Coronis after her lover Apollo discovered she was cheating on him. But Coronis had conceived a son to him and before her body had been consumed by the funerary pyre he saved the child (Asclepius) and brought him to Chiron, who reared him and taught him the art of healing. When Chiron's daughter Ocyrhoe saw him, she prophesied his destiny and death. Because of this, Zeus turned her into a mare. In fact, Asclepius would later die because of his hubris: he had become such a skilled medic he could resurrect the dead and Zeus would end up killing him for this after getting a complaint from Hades. Though Zeus would later revive him as a God to avoid any feuds with Apollo.
- Jason – The leader of the Argonauts was, in some versions, raised by Chiron. Jason's father Aeson had been locked up by his brother Pelias, yet he managed to conceive a son with a woman named Alcimede. When Alcimede delivered Jason, she pretended he was a stillborn to escape Pelias' notice and then gave him to Chiron. Jason's son Medus will also become one of the centaur's students.
- Medus – Alternatively called Medeus or Polyxenus, his mother was Medea, but accounts differ about his father, who may be either Jason, an Asian king, or Aegeus of Athens. Just like his father, he was reared by Chiron. Later in his life, he would become the first king of the Medes.
- Melanion – An Arcadian hunter, son of Amphidamas, who took part in the Calydonian boar hunt, and through his devotion won the heart of Atalanta.
- Patroclus is also numbered amongst the students by Statius (a Roman poet of the 1st century AD) in his unfinished work, the Achilleid, although Homer clearly contradicts him.

According to Ptolemy Hephaestion (probably the same as Ptolemaeus Chennus), a writer and playwright whose works are now lost, Chiron was also the mentor of the god Dionysus (who became the centaur's eromenos, and learned from him chants and dances) and of a youth named Cocytus; the latter supposedly cured Adonis when he was wounded by a wild boar using the medical techniques learned from his teacher. It is worthy of note that Ptolemy's account only survived thanks to Photios I's summary of his works. Photios I, an ecumenical patriarch of the 9th century AD, harshly criticized Ptolemy, denouncing him for seemingly distorting, inventing and misinterpreting myths. Considering little is known about Ptolemy and his works are not preserved, it is unknown whether he was simply reporting alternative versions of myths or making them up.

=== Death ===
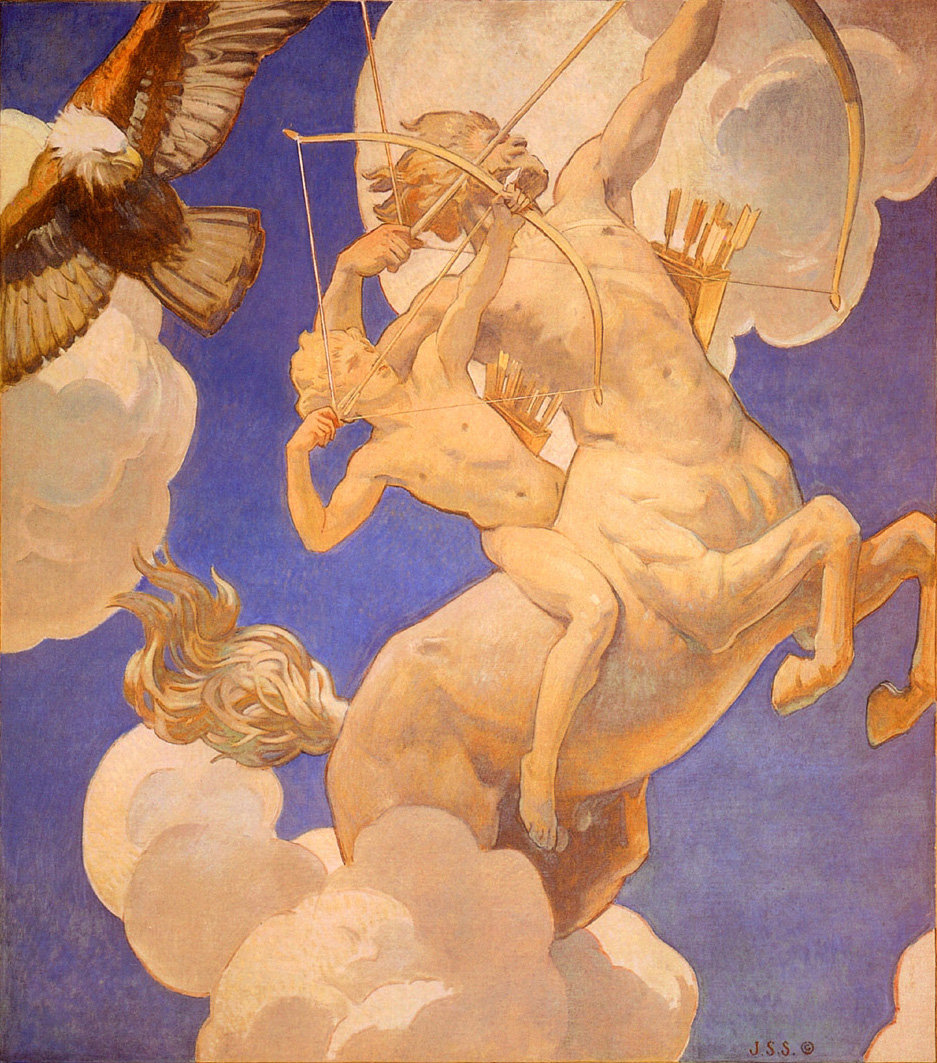
Chiron and Achilles by John Singer Sargent (circa 1922–1925)

His nobility is further reflected in the story of his death: although immortal, Chiron willingly relinquished his immortality after being incurably wounded, an act that allowed Zeus to release Prometheus from his punishment for giving fire to humankind. As the son of Cronus he could not die naturally, so it was left to Heracles to negotiate the exchange with Zeus. Chiron was pierced with an arrow belonging to Heracles that had been treated with the blood of the Hydra, or, in other versions, poison that Chiron had previously given to Heracles during the period when Heracles was under Chiron’s tutelage. According to a Scholium on Theocritus, this had taken place during the visit of Heracles to the cave of Pholus on Mount Pelion in Thessaly during his fourth labour, defeating the Erymanthian Boar. While they were at supper, Heracles asked for some wine to accompany his meal. Pholus, who ate his food raw, was taken aback. He had been given a vessel of sacred wine by Dionysus sometime earlier, to be kept in trust by the centaurs until the right time for its opening. At Heracles' prompting, Pholus was forced to produce the vessel of sacred wine. The hero, gasping for wine, grabbed it from him and forced it open. Thereupon the vapors of the sacred wine wafted out of the cave and intoxicated the wild centaurs led by Nessus who had gathered outside. They attacked with stones and fir trees the cave which was located in the neighbourhood of Malea. Heracles was forced to shoot many arrows (poisoned with the blood of the Hydra) to drive them back. During the assault, Chiron was hit in the thigh by one of the poisoned arrows. After the centaurs had fled, Pholus emerged from the cave to observe the destruction. Being of a philosophical frame of mind, he pulled one of the arrows from the body of a dead centaur and wondered how such a little thing as an arrow could have caused so much death and destruction. In that instant, he let slip the arrow from his hand and it dropped and hit him in the hoof, killing him instantly. This, however, is open to controversy, because Pholus shared the "civilized centaur" form with Chiron in some art images, and thus would have been immortal.

Ironically, Chiron, the master of the healing arts, could not heal himself and willingly gave up his immortality. For this reason, his half-brother Zeus took pity on him and thus placed him among the stars in the sky to be honored. The Greeks identified him as the constellation Centaurus.

In Ovid's poem Fasti, Ovid has the hero Hercules visiting Chiron's home on Pelion while the child Achilles is there. While Chiron is examining Hercules' weapons, one of the arrows dipped in Lernaean hydra venom falls on Chiron's left foot and poisons him:

And while the old man fingered the shafts clotted with poison, one of the arrows fell out of the quiver and stuck in his left foot. Chiron groaned and drew the steel from his body.

Chiron then tries to use herbs to heal himself, but fails. After nine days with a weeping Achilles looking on, Chiron passes into the stars becoming a constellation.

== The Precepts of Chiron ==
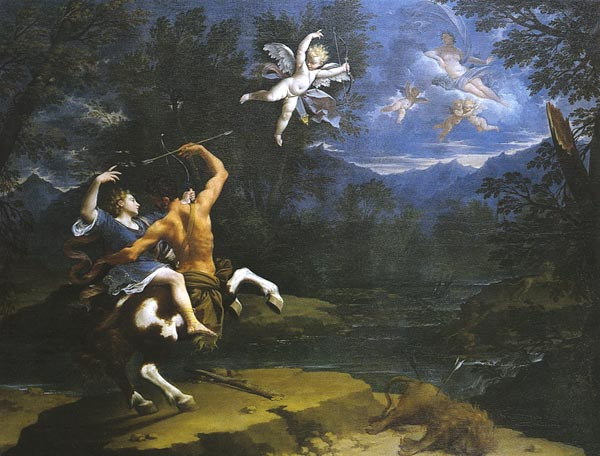
The Education of Achilles by Donato Creti, 1714 (Collezioni Comunali d'Arte di Palazzo d'Accursio, Bologna, Italy)

A didactic poem, Precepts of Chiron, has been lost. However, fragments in heroic hexameters that survive in quotations are considered to belong to it. The common thread in the fragments, which may reflect in some degree the Acharnian image of Chiron and his teaching, is that it is expository rather than narrative, and suggests that, rather than recounting the inspiring events of archaic times as men like Nestor or Glaucus might do, Chiron taught the primeval ways of mankind, the gods and nature, beginning with the caution "First, whenever you come to your house, offer good sacrifices to the eternal gods".

== Statius' Achilleid ==
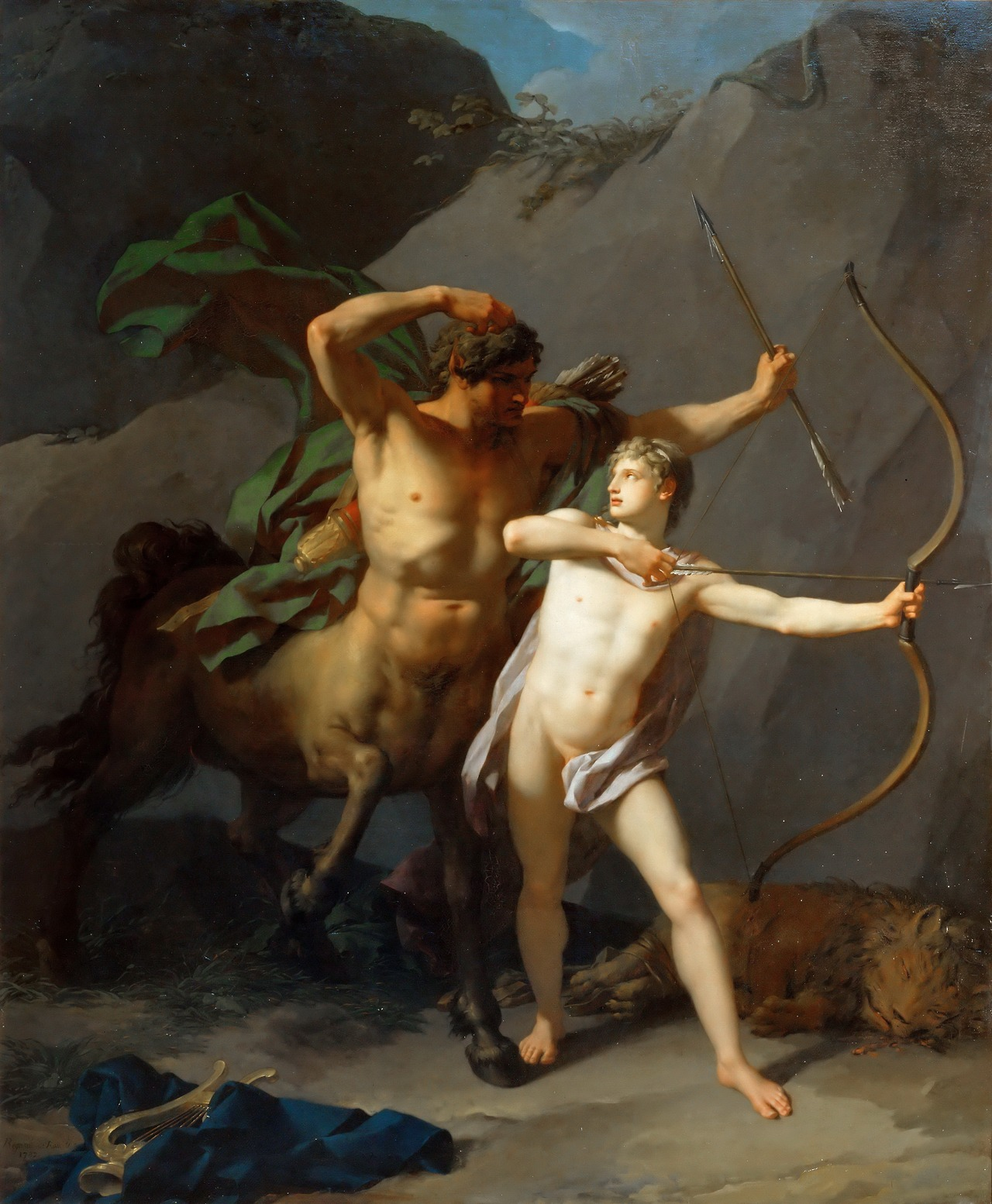
Jean-Baptiste Regnault (1754–1829): L'Éducation d'Achille par le centaure Chiron (The Education of Achilles by the centaur Chiron, 1782.) Musée du Louvre, Paris. Chiron teaches the art of archery.

The Achilleid was to be an epic poem on the life of Achilles. However, its author, Statius, died during the writing of the second book late in the first century AD during the reign of the Emperor Domitian. The Achilleid shows the relationship between Chiron and his charge, Achilles. During Book One, the close relationship between Chiron and Achilles is made clear when Thetis spends the evening with them in Chiron's cave on Mount Pelion, before leaving with Achilles. Chiron is shown in a paternal capacity, rather than that of merely a teacher, and is depicted as far from animal.

Night draws to slumber. The huge Centaur collapses on stone and Achilles fondly twines himself about his shoulders, though his mother is there, preferring the familiar bosom. (1.195–97).

Here, Statius is showing a loving relationship between the two characters, which the traditional view of Chiron never explored. Later, when describing what he ate when growing up, Achilles refers to Chiron as a parent; "thus that father of mine used to feed me" (2.102), the Latin used here is 'pater' so we may judge this an accurate translation. This further demonstrates the nature of the loving relationship between Chiron and Achilles. Statius here may be continuing a theme started by Ovid in Fasti several years earlier.

In Fasti, on Chiron's death, Achilles says "'Live, I beg you; don't leave me, dear father [pater]!'"(5.412), this would suggest that in Rome the reconfiguration of Chiron's myth was as a loving and loved foster parent, rather than simply teacher. Chiron's relationship with his pupil is used to demonstrate a Roman longing for the father-son relationship.

In addition to Chiron's loving characteristics developed in Book One, Book Two of The Achilleid has Achilles describe many tasks Chiron would make him perform during his heroic education, including standing in fast flowing rivers;

I stood, but the angry river and the mist of his broad rush took me back. He bore down on me with savage threats and scolded to shame me. I did not leave till ordered (2.146–150).

There is a clear contrast here in the hardship and insults Chiron is directing at his pupil compared to his previous kindness. However, this duality can be seen as a demonstration of a traditional Roman education, especially a noble one; learning both military and refined arts, however the emphasis is on the duality and complexity of universal emotions, that we can hold both tender love and anger towards the same person we are in relationship with. Centaurs in antiquity were often remembered for their battle with the Lapiths. Statius deliberately disassociates Chiron from this story with his description of Chiron's cave on Pelion,

Here are no darts that have tasted human blood, no ash trees fractured in festive combats, nor mixing bowls shattered upon kindred foes (1.111–15).

Instead of combat, the emphasis is that Chiron's weapons are only used for hunting and there are no signs of savage behaviour. In addition to Achilles' descriptions of the physical lessons Chiron gives him he also refers to a more cultured education,

He fixed in my mind the precepts of sacred justice (2.163–4).

Statius creates an image of Chiron that is not only a loving father, but a strict and wise teacher, disassociated with the bestial aspects of centaurs.

== Gallery ==
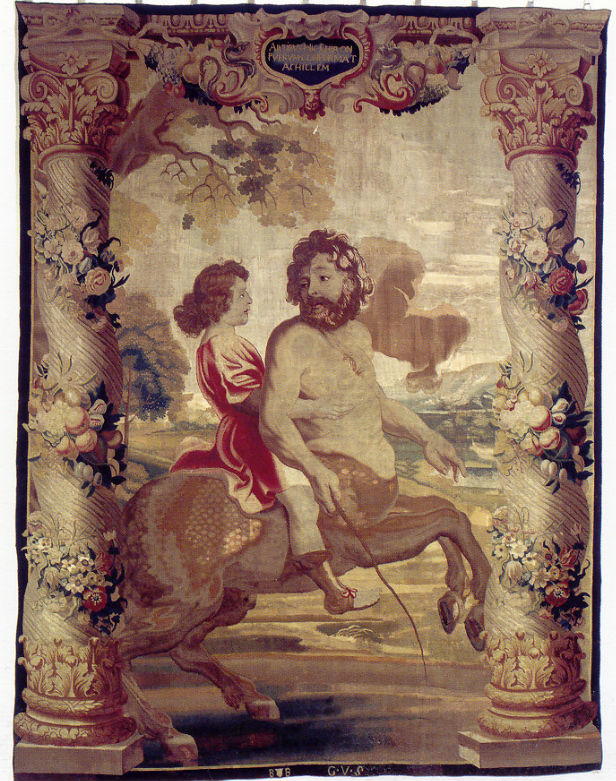
Chiron and Achilles, tapestry by Rubens (17th century)

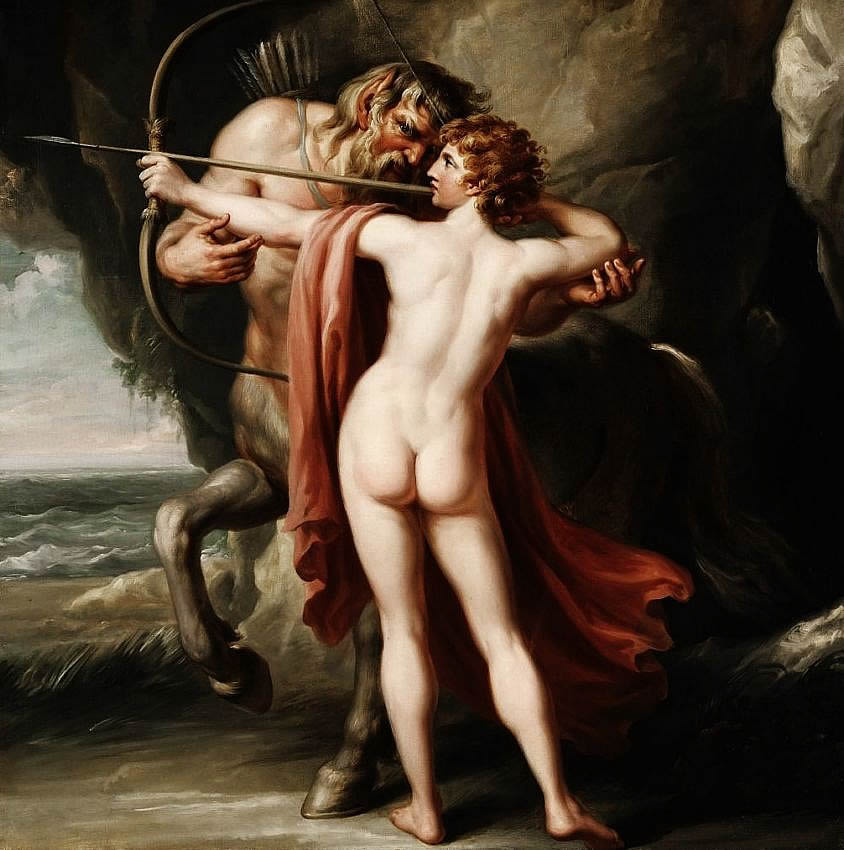
Chiron Instructing Achilles in the Bow by Giovanni Battista Cipriani (circa 1776)

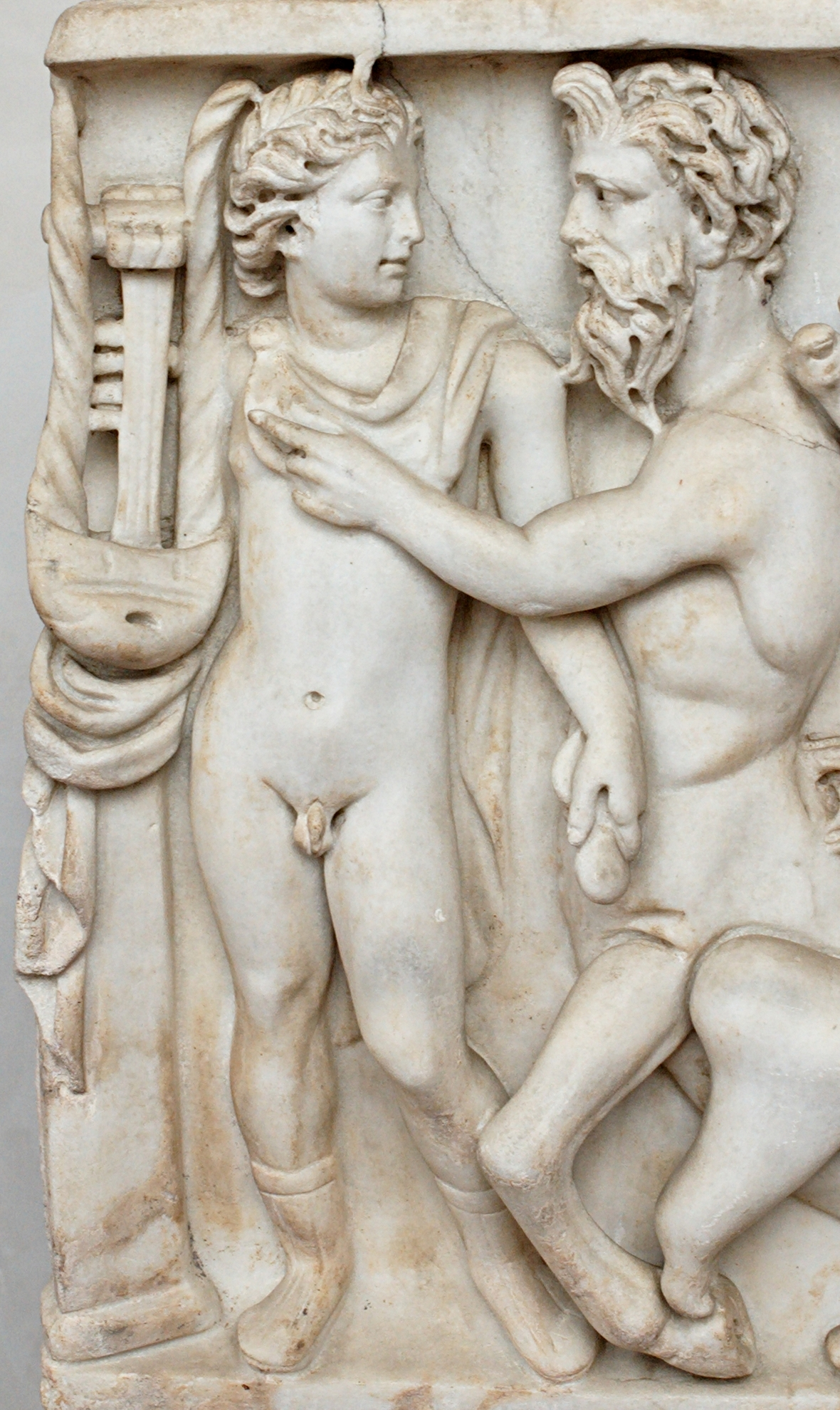
Achilles and Chiron, detail from a sarcophagus from the Via Casilina in Torraccia. (3rd century CE)

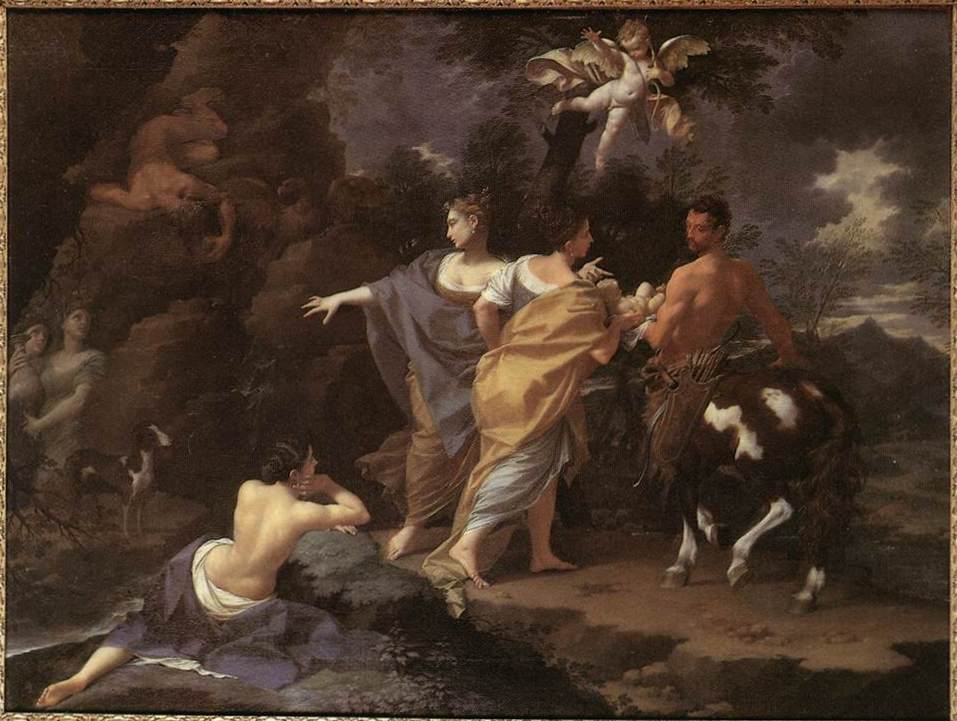
Achilles Handing over to Chiron by Donato Creti

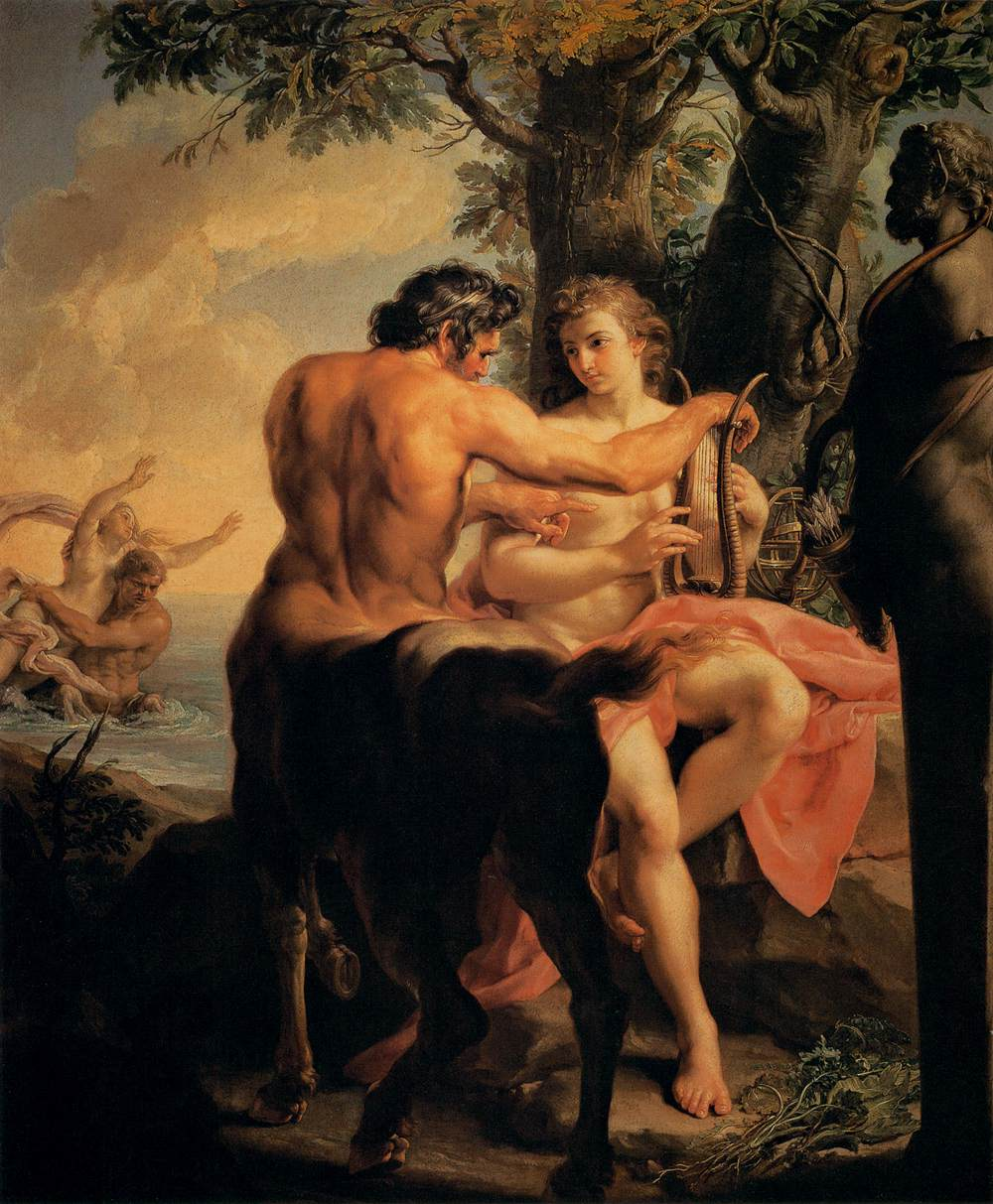
Achilles and Chiron by Puget

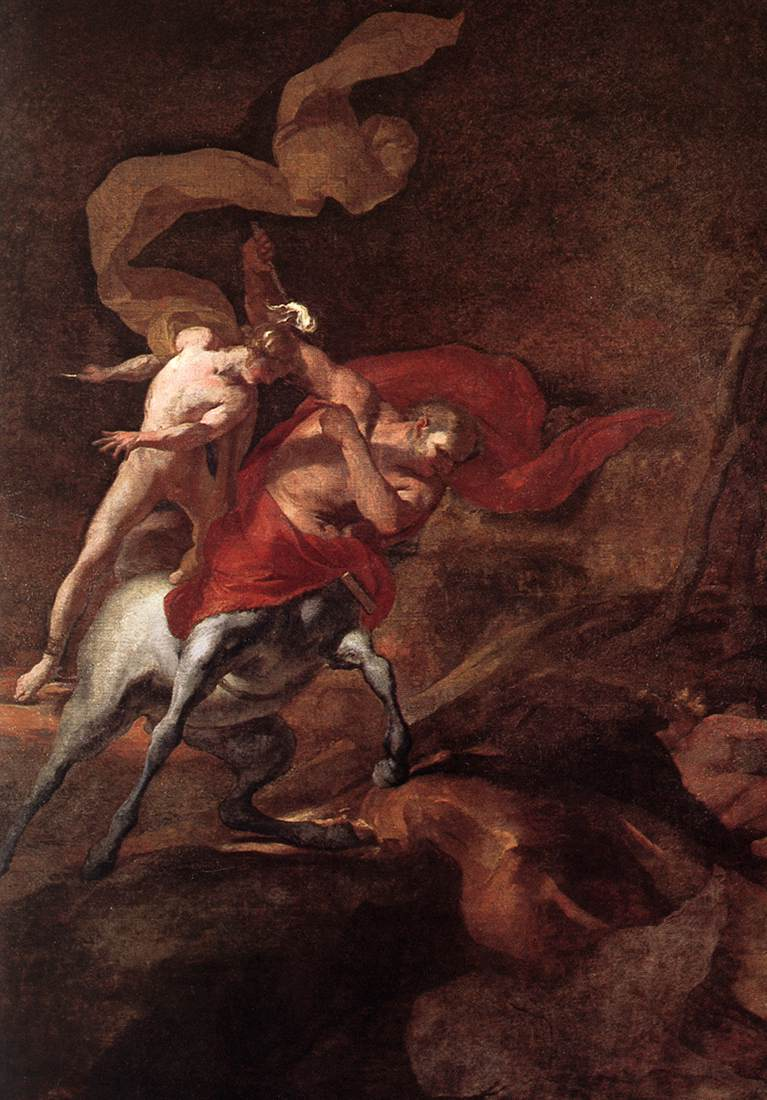
The Education of Achilles by Chiron by Pierre Paul Puget (circa 1690)

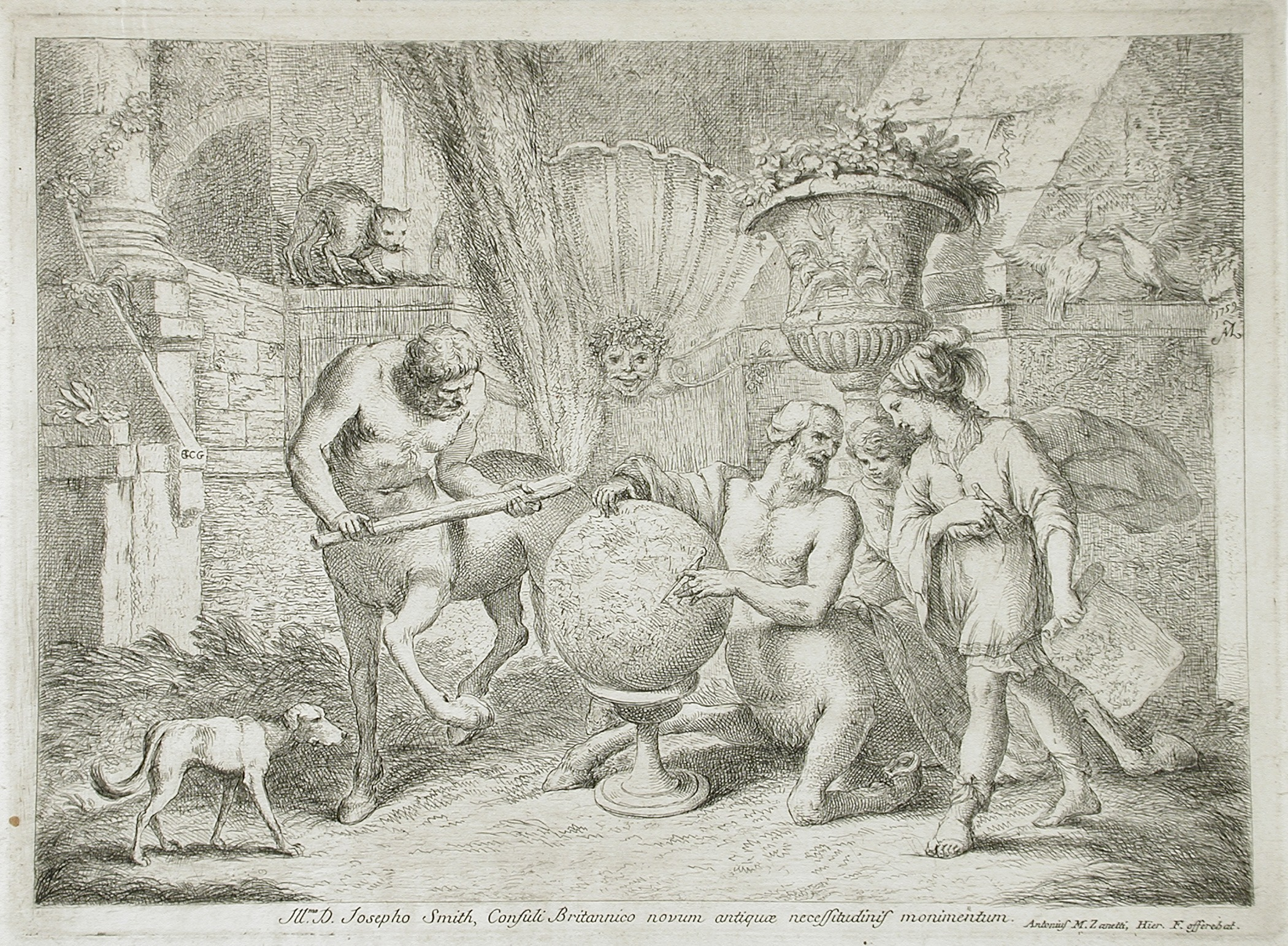
The Centaur Chiron Teaching Geography to the Young Achilles

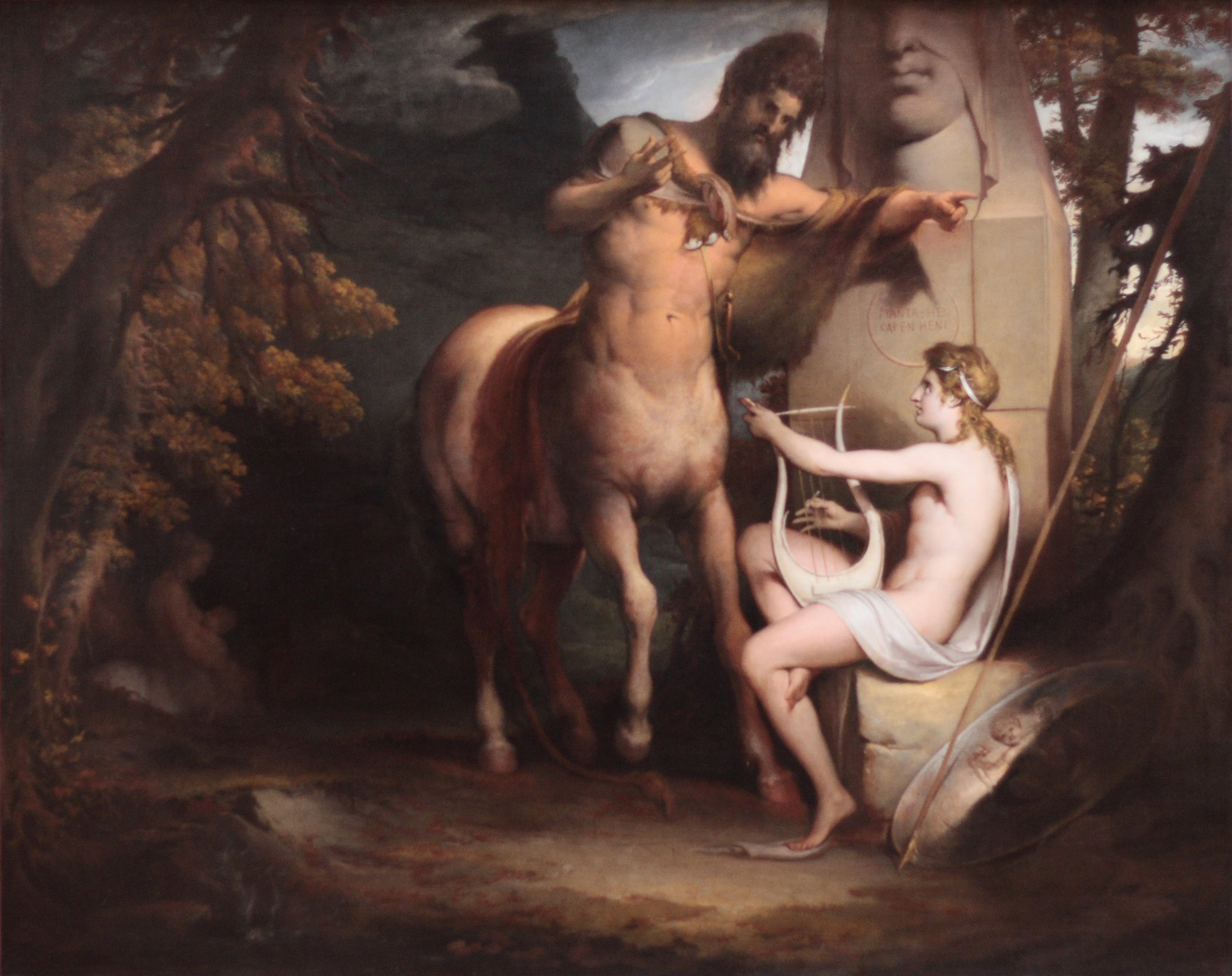
The Education of Achilles by James Barry

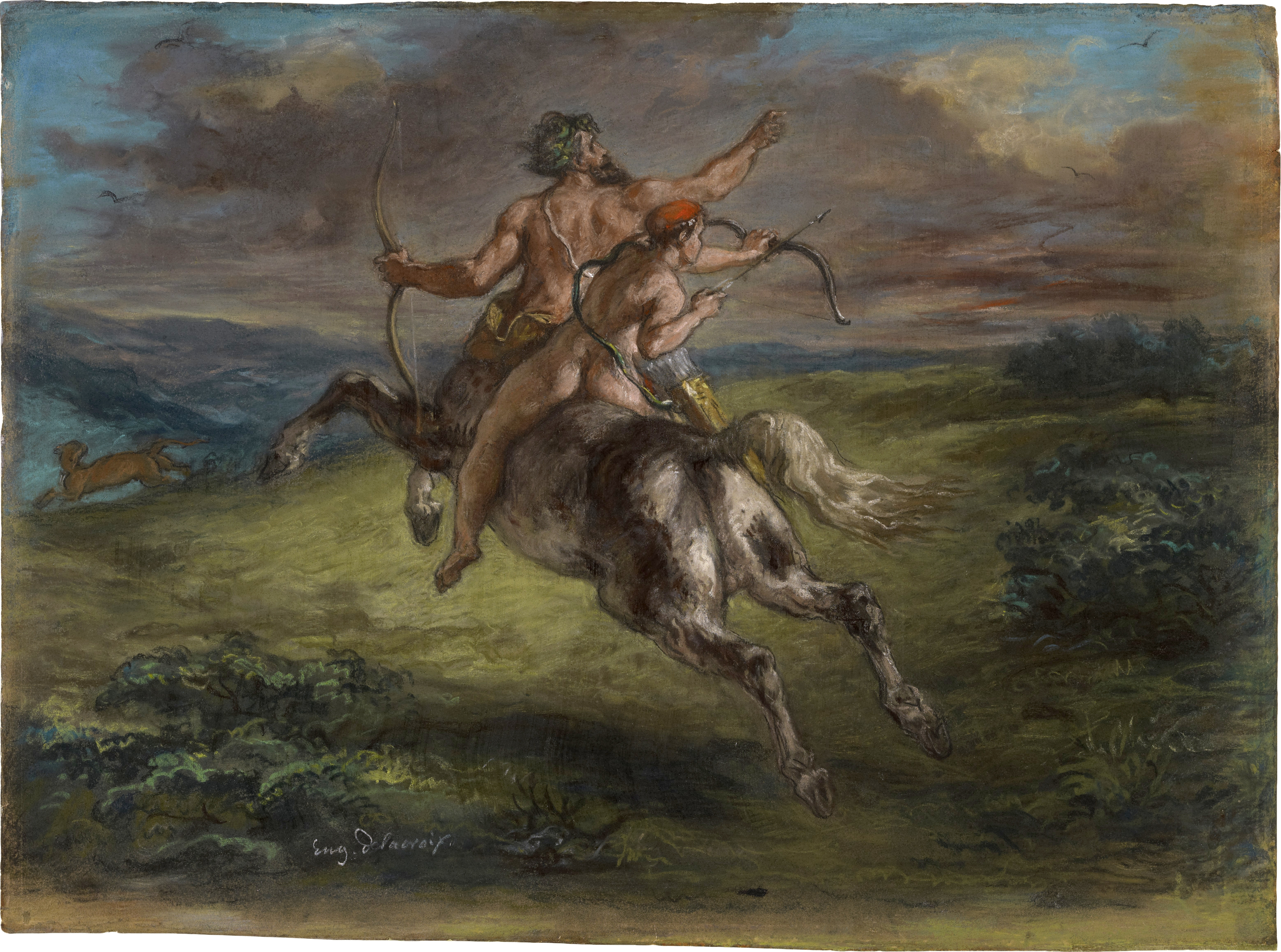
The Education of Achilles by Eugène Delacroix (circa 1862)

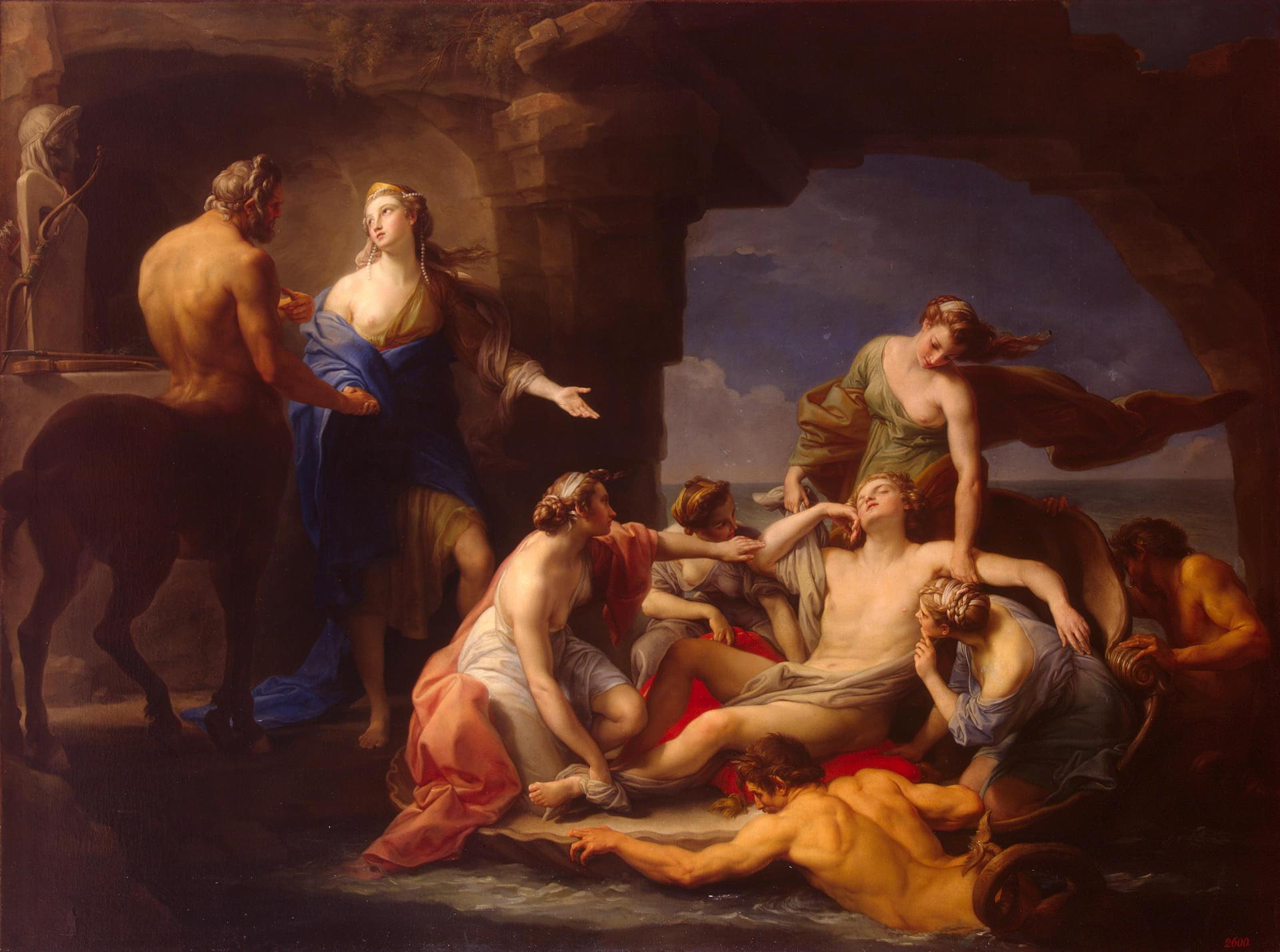
Thetis takes Achilles from the Centaur Chiron by Pompeo Batoni (1770)

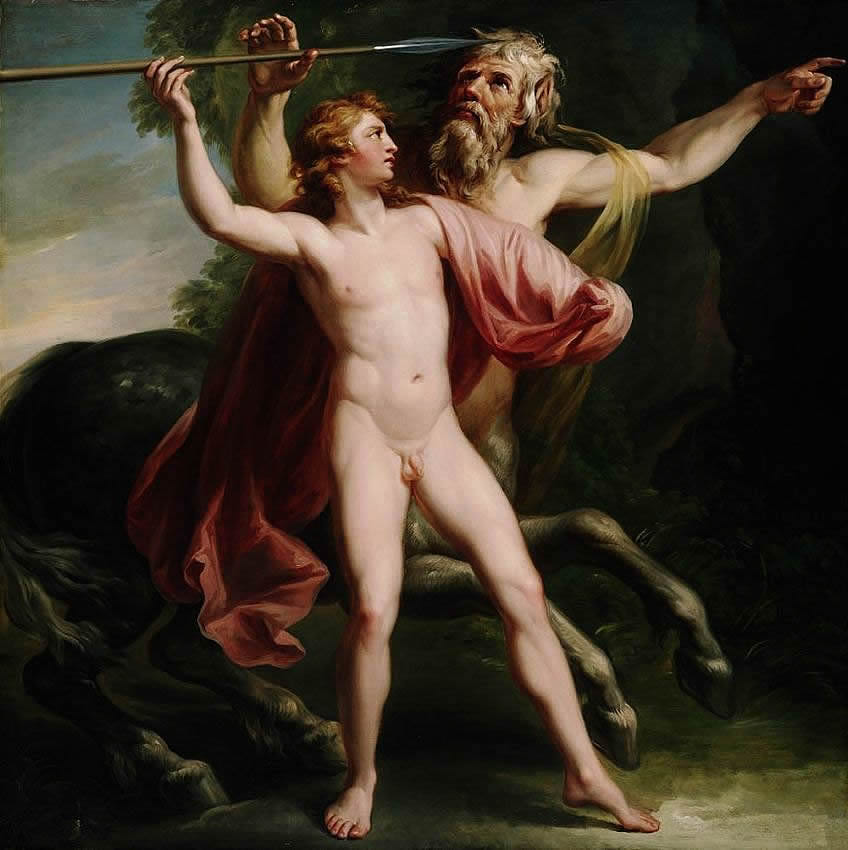
Achilles learns the Javelin by Giovanni Battista Cipriani (Circa 1776)

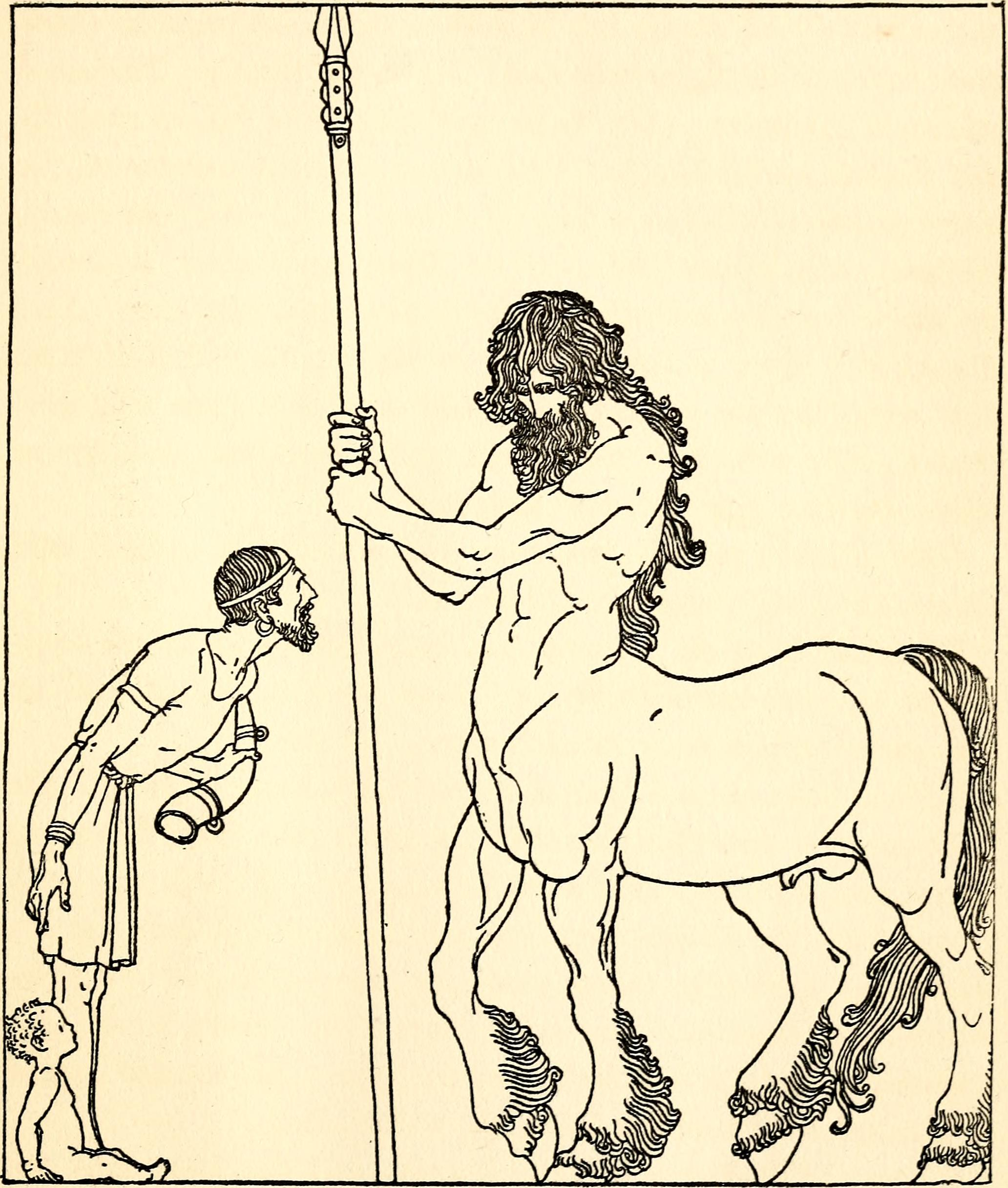
Peleus entrusting his son Achilles to Chiron

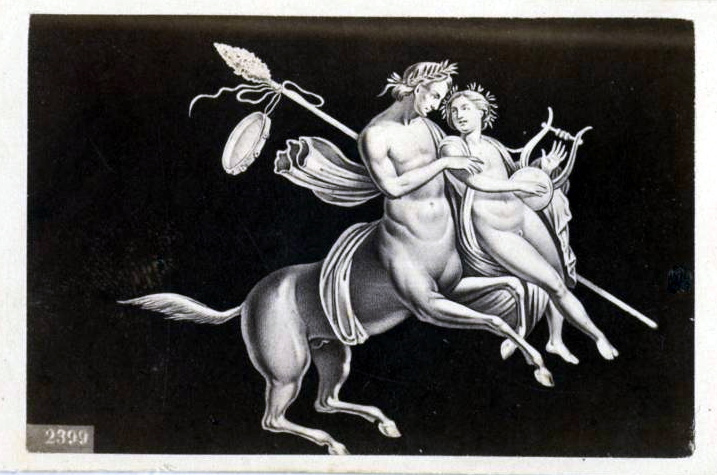
Chiron and Achilles by Giorgio Sommer & Edmond Behles (early 20th c.)

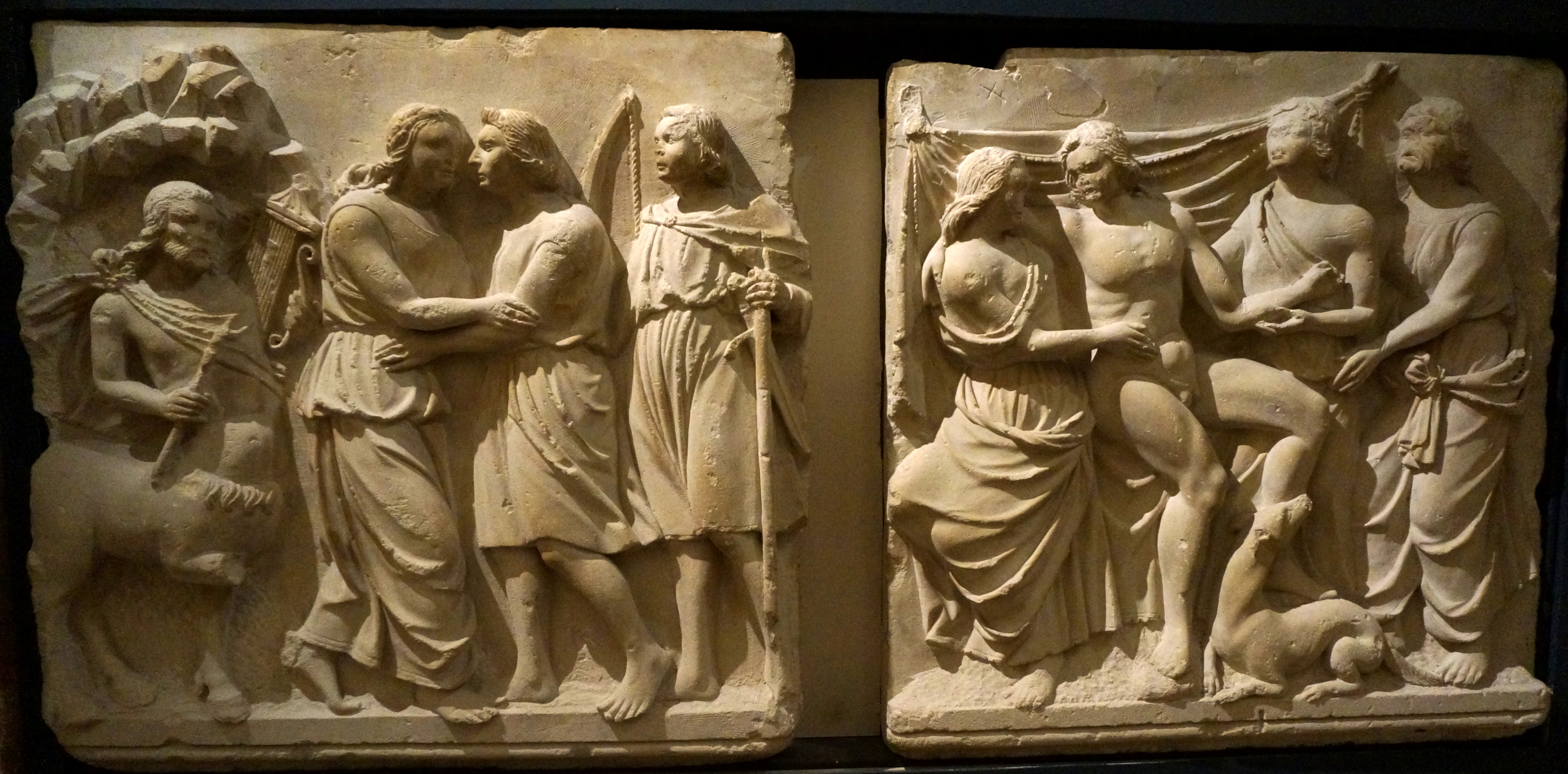
Thétis et Achille chez Chiron

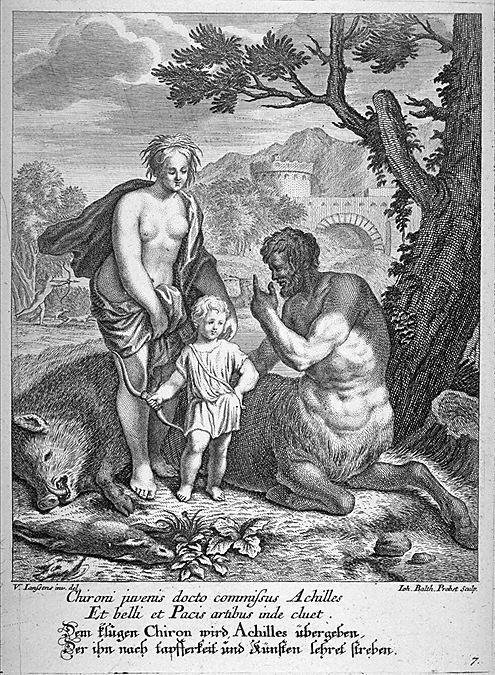
Thetis gives Achilles into the care of Chiron by Johann Balthasar Probst (17th/18th century)

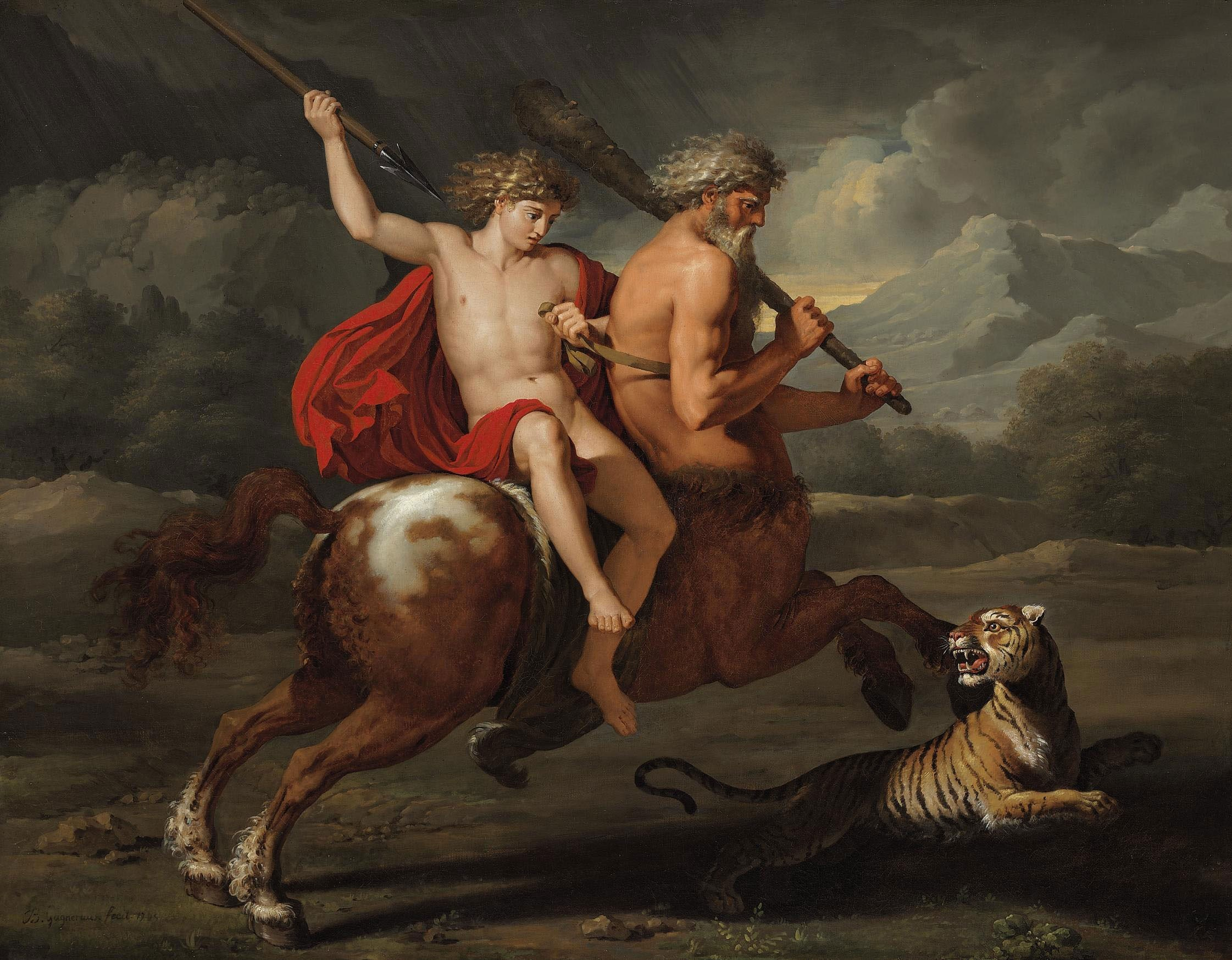
The Education of Achilles by Bénigne Gagneraux (1785)

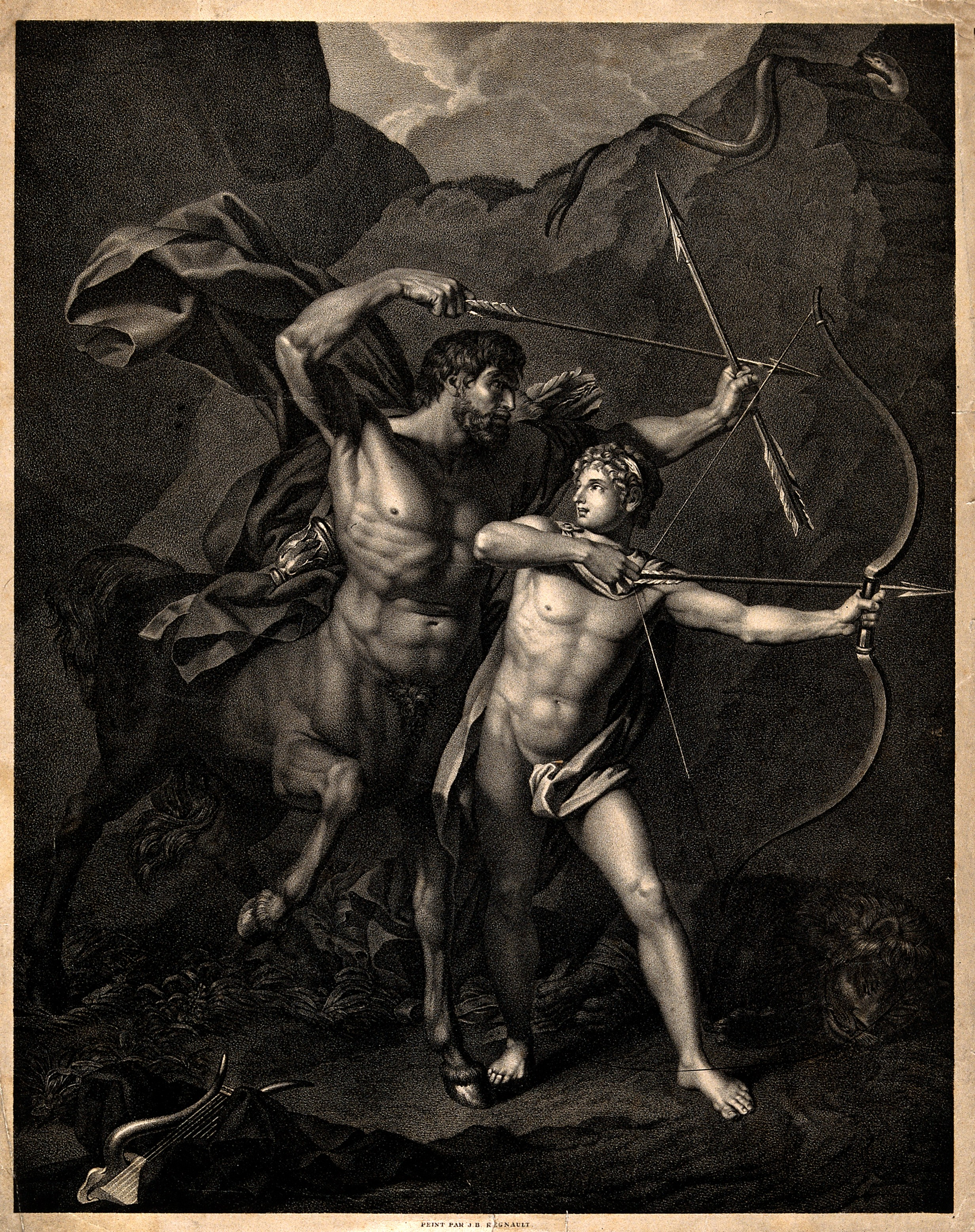
Jean-Baptiste Regnault: The Education of Achilles (1782). Lithograph copy (1798)

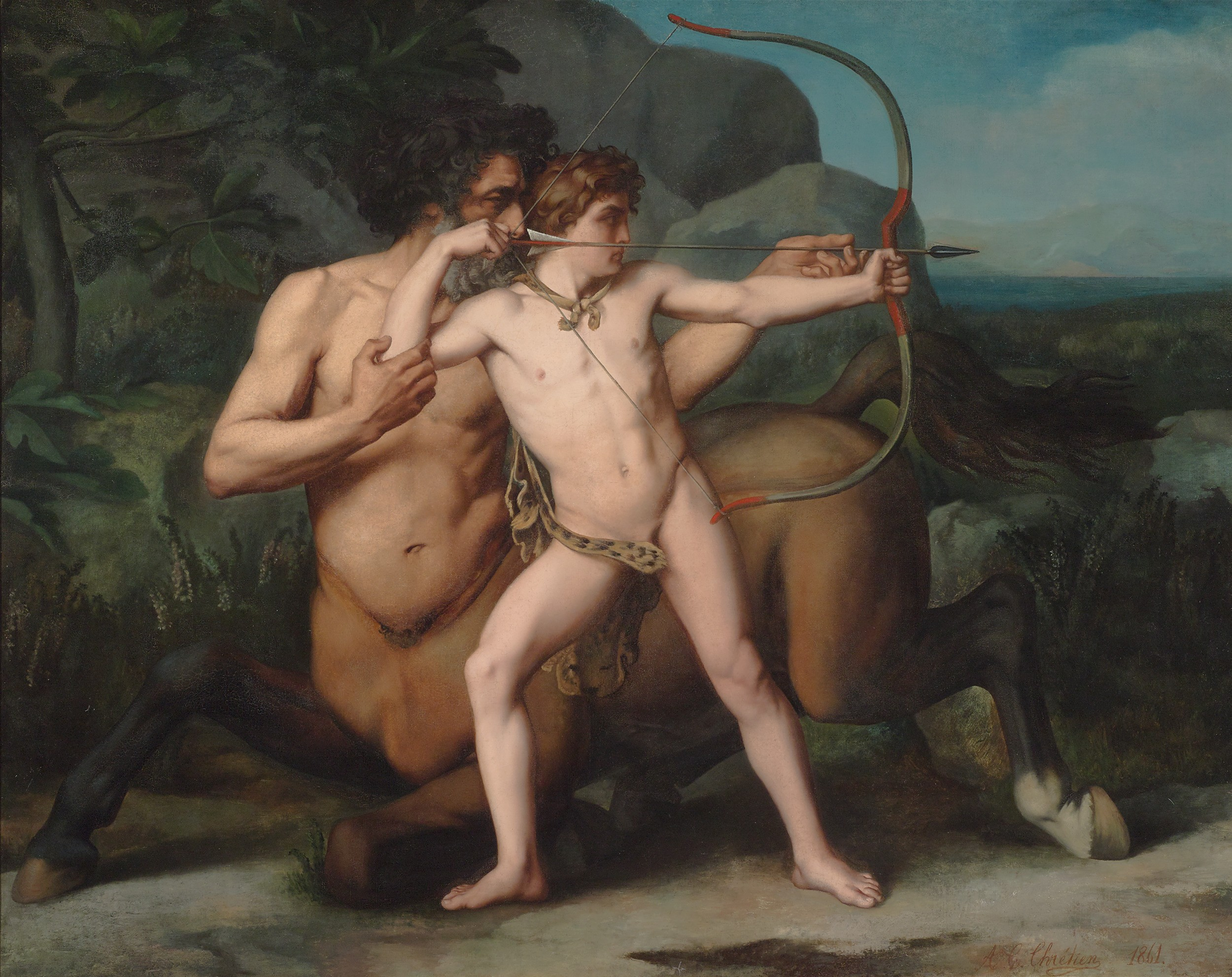
The Education of Achilles by Auguste-Clément Chrétien (1861)

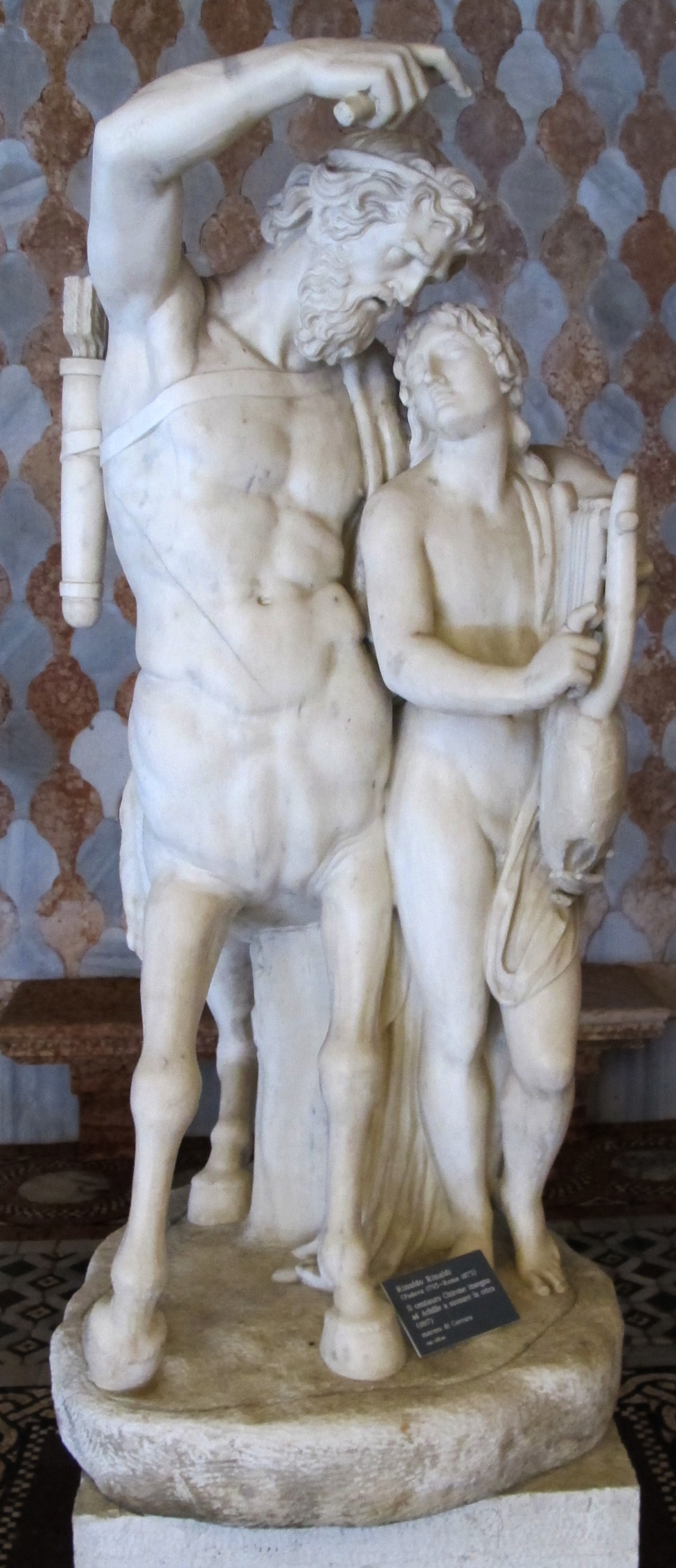
Chirone insegna ad Achille a suonare la cetra by Rinaldo Rinaldi (1817)

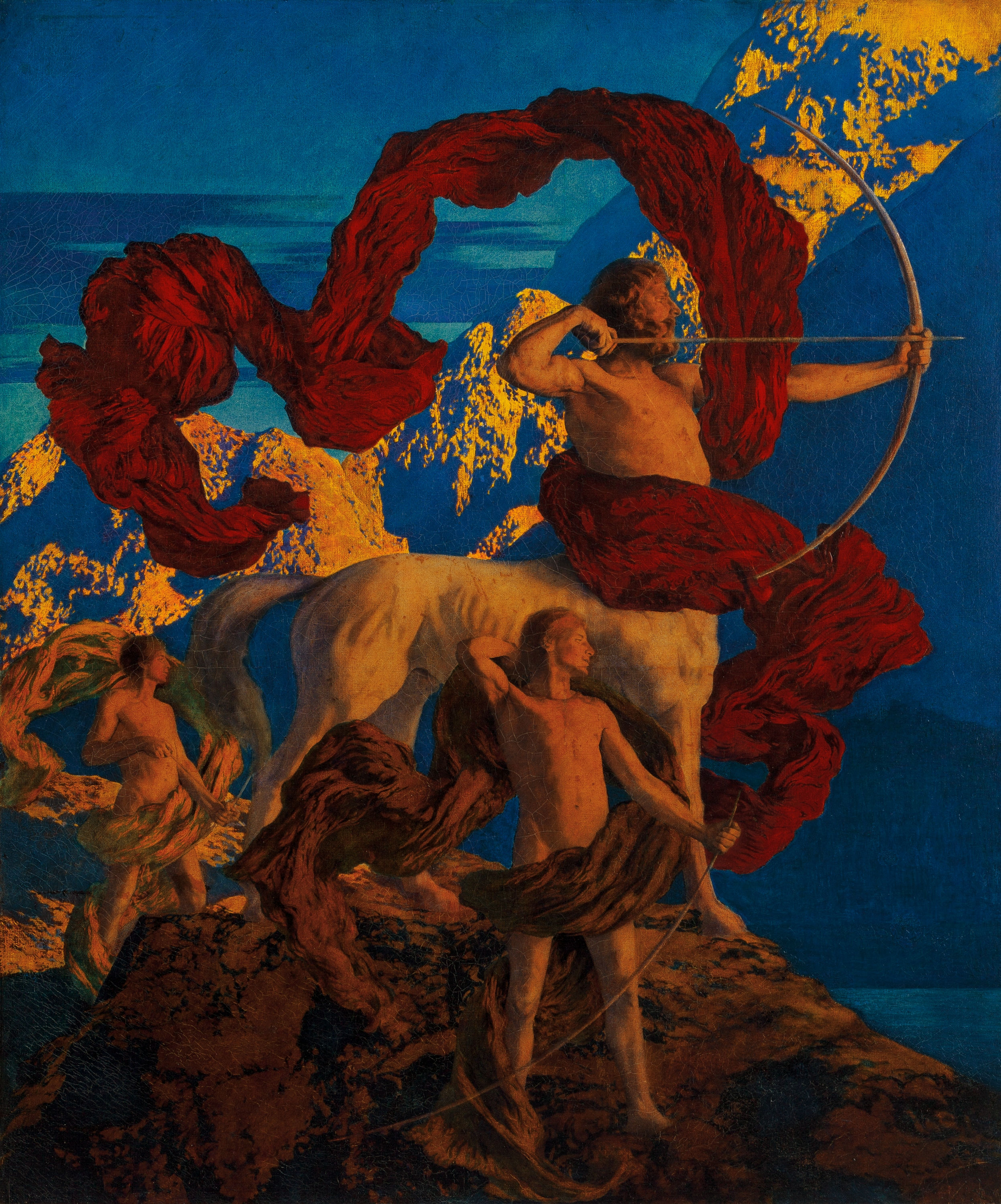
Jason and His Teacher by Maxfield Parrish (1909)

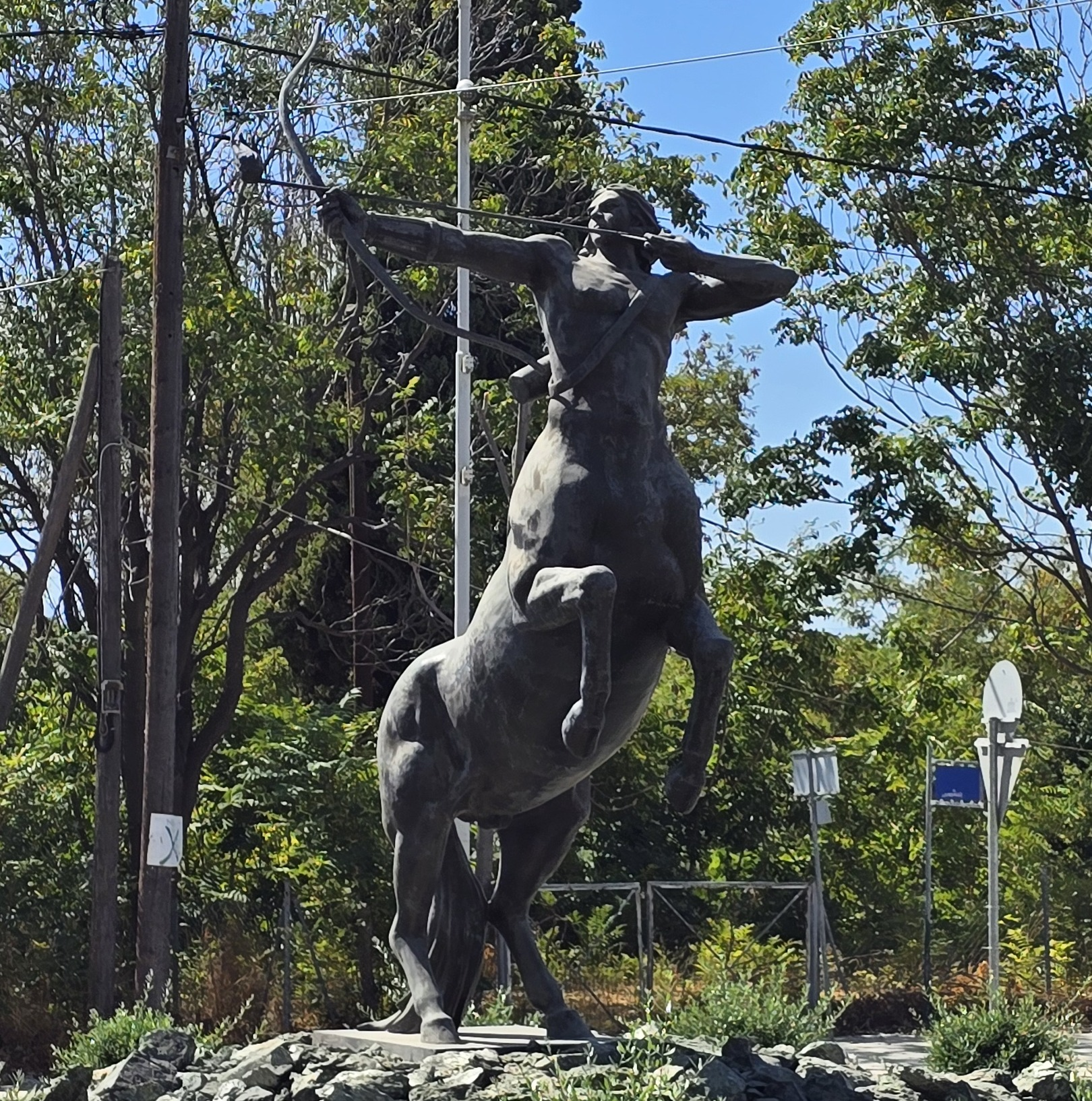
Statue of Chiron in Volos, Greece

== See also ==
- Chyron, a synonym for lower third television graphics
- Chyron Corporation, named in reference to Chiron
- 2060 Chiron, a small Solar System body named after Chiron
