= Halae Araphenides =

- Ἁλαὶ Ἀραφηνίδες (Ancient Greek)
- Halae Araphenides is along the right coast
- Interactive map of Halae Araphenides
- 37°59′14″N 24°00′16″E
- Type: Deme
- Periods: Archaic Greek
- Satellite of: Athens, Aigeis tribe, trittys of Paralia
- Location: Rafina, Attica, Greece
- Region: Attica

Halae Araphenides or Halai Araphenides (Ancient Greek: Ἁλαὶ Ἀραφηνίδες, romanized: Halái Araphenídes) was a deme of ancient Attica, situated on its eastern coast between Brauron and Araphen, and was the harbour of Brauron, whence persons crossed over to Marmarium in Euboea.

== Etymology ==
The deme draws the first part of its name from the saltiness along the coast, while the second part was introduced to distinguish it from the deme of Halae Aexonides.

== History ==
Halae was mentioned by Euripides as close to the chain of Karystia. In this place was conserved a statue of Artemis Tauria brought from Tauris by Iphigenia and Orestes.

In the deme, expiatory rites were held which consisted of withdrawing drops of blood from the throat of a man by means of a knife; furthermore, they had midnight feasts and Pyrrhic dances.

Its port was also used by citizens of a Brauron and for the marble quarries of Karystos, near the island of Euboea, being the closest port of Attica.

== Location ==
The site of Halae Araphenides is located near modern Artemida, Attica (formerly, Loutsa).

== Bibliography ==
Primary sources

- Strabo. Geography. (here)

Secondary sources

- Lohmann, Hans. "Halae". Brill's New Pauly.
