= Arne (mythology) =

Characters in Greek mythology

In Greek mythology, Arne (/ˈɑːrniː/; Ancient Greek: Ἄρνη, romanized: Árnē) may refer to four different characters:

- Arne, the nymph nurse of Poseidon. She was previously called Sinoessa (Σινόεσσα) but when she took the young god from Rhea to raise and denying him to Cronus, she was named Arne afterwards. When Cronus searched after his son, Arne is said to have declared that she knew not where he was. From her the town of Arne was believed to have received its name which was also called Sinoessa in earlier times.
- Arne (daughter of Aeolus), daughter of Aeolus (son of Hellen) and mother of Aeolus (son of Poseidon) and Boeotia by Poseidon.
- Arne, mother by Aeson of Jason and possibly Promachus. In some accounts, Jason's mother was called (1) Alcimede, daughter of Phylacus; (2) Polymede (Polymele or Polypheme), daughter of Autolycus; (3) Amphinome; (4) Rhoeo, daughter of Staphylus; (5) Theognete, daughter of Laodicus; and lastly, (6) Scarphe.
- Arne Sithonis, a princess who betrayed her motherland for a bribe from King Minos of Crete.
