= Scarphe (mythology) =

Ancient Greek mythological figure

In Greek mythology, Scarphe (Ancient Greek: Σκάρφη, romanized: Skárphē, lit. 'black hellebore') was possibly the mother, by Aeson, King of Iolcus, of Jason and possibly Promachus (the latter’s brother).

In some accounts, she was called either (1) Arne; (2) Alcimede, daughter of Phylacus; (3) Polymede (Polymele or Polypheme), daughter of Autolycus; (4) Amphinome; (5) Rhoeo, daughter of Staphylus or lastly, (6) Theognete, daughter of Laodicus.
