= Amphinome =

Set of mythological Greek characters

In Greek mythology, the name Amphinome (Ancient Greek: Ἀμφινόμη, lit. 'she of the surrounding pasture') may refer to the following deity and women:

- Amphinome, the Nereid who feeds Poseidon's flock. As one of the 50 marine-nymphs, she was a daughter of the 'Old Man of the Sea' Nereus and the Oceanid Doris. Amphinome and her other sisters appeared to Thetis when she cries out in sympathy for the grief of Achilles for his slain friend Patroclus.
- Amphinome, wife of Aeson, King of Iolcus. She was the mother to Jason and Promachus, Aeson's sons. She and her husband were persecuted by king Pelias of Iolcus. After Pelias had killed her husband and younger son, Amphinome stabbed herself with a sword. As she lay dying she pronounced a curse against the king. Otherwise, the mother of the hero was called (1) Polymele (Polymede or Polypheme); (2) Theognete, daughter of Laodicus; (3) Rhoeo, daughter of Staphylus; (4) Alcimede, daughter of Phylacus; and lastly (5) Arne or (6) Scarphe.
- Amphinome, one of the Peliades, daughters of Pelias and sister of Alcestis and Evadne. She was given by Jason in marriage to Andraemon, brother of Leonteus.
- Amphinome, wife of Arizelus and mother of Harpalion.
