= Polypheme (mythology) =

In Greek mythology, Polypheme (Ancient Greek: Πολυφήμην) may refer to the following:

- Polypheme, daughter of Autolycus and the possible mother of Jason by Aeson, King of Iolcus. She was also called Polymele or Polymede; otherwise the mother of the hero was either (1) Alcimede, daughter of Phylacus; (2) Amphinome; (3) Rhoeo, daughter of Staphylus; (4) Theognete, daughter of Laodicus; and lastly, (5) Arne or (6) Scarphe.
- Polypheme, another form of the name Polyphemus, the Cyclops who was encountered by Odysseus in one his adventures to go back home at Ithaca.
