= Theognete =

In Greek mythology, Theognete (Ancient Greek: Θεογνήτης) was the daughter of Laodicus. By Aeson, King of Iolcus, she was the mother of Jason and possibly Promachus (Jason's brother).

In some accounts, she was called either (1) Alcimede, daughter of Phylacus; (2) Polymede (Polymele or Polypheme), daughter of Autolycus; (3) Amphinome; (4) Rhoeo, daughter of Staphylus; and lastly (5) Arne or (6) Scarphe.
