= Polymede =

In Greek mythology, the female name Polymede (Ancient Greek: Πολυμήδη, romanized: Polymēdē, lit. 'many counsels', 'much wisdom' or 'many plans/ tricks') may refer to:

- Polymede, daughter of Autolycus by Mestra, Neaera or Amphithea; and the possible mother of Jason by Aeson, King of Iolcus. She was also called Polymele or Polypheme; otherwise the mother of the hero was either (1) Alcimede, daughter of Phylacus; (2) Amphinome; (3) Rhoeo, daughter of Staphylus; (4) Theognete, daughter of Laodicus; and lastly, (5) Arne or (6) Scarphe.
- Polymede, mother of Nestor by Neleus, king of Pylos. Otherwise, Nestor's mother was known as Chloris, a Minyan princess and daughter of King Amphion of Orchomenus.
