= Polymele =

Set of mythological Greek characters

In Greek mythology, the name Polymela or Polymele (Ancient Greek: Πολυμήλη, romanized: Polymēla or Polumḗlē, lit. 'many songs’, derived from polys, ‘many’ and melos, ‘song') may refer to the following figures:

- Polymele, daughter of Autolycus and one of the possible mothers of Jason by Aeson, King of Iolcus. She was also called Polymede or Polypheme, otherwise the mother of the hero was either (1) Alcimede, daughter of Phylacus; (2) Amphinome; (3) Rhoeo, daughter of Staphylus; (4) Theognete, daughter of Laodicus; and lastly, (5) Scarphe or (6) Arne.
- Polymele, daughter of King Actor of Phthia and wife of Peleus. When her brothers plotted against Peleus, the hero drove them out of the kingdom and Actor gave his daughter Polymela to Peleus and handed over to him the kingship; from this union was born a daughter named Polydora, and a son, Achilles.
- Polymele, daughter of Peleus and one of the possible mothers of Patroclus by Menoetius, the other two being Sthenele and Periopis; some refer to her as "Philomela".
- Polymele, wife of Thestor and mother of Calchas and possibly also of Leucippe and Theonoe.
- Polymele, daughter of Phylas and wife of Echecles. She was loved by Hermes, who spotted her while she was performing a ritual dance in honor of Artemis, and had by him a son, Eudoros.
- Polymele, daughter of Aeolus. When Odysseus visited their island, he fell in love with her and lay with her secretly. Soon after the guest's departure, Aeolus discovered his daughter crying over some spoils from Troy which Odysseus had given to her as presents. Outraged, he was about to exact vengeance upon Polymele, but his son Diores, who was in love with his own sister, intervened and implored Aeolus to marry her to him, to which Aeolus consented.

== See also ==
- 15094 Polymele, a Trojan asteroid

== General and cited references ==
- Apollodorus, The Library with an English Translation by Sir James George Frazer, F.B.A., F.R.S. in 2 Volumes, Cambridge, MA, Harvard University Press; London, William Heinemann Ltd. 1921. ISBN 0-674-99135-4. Online version at the Perseus Digital Library. Greek text available from the same website.
- Diodorus Siculus, The Library of History translated by Charles Henry Oldfather. Twelve volumes. Loeb Classical Library. Cambridge, Massachusetts: Harvard University Press; London: William Heinemann, Ltd. 1989. Vol. 3. Books 4.59–8. Online version at Bill Thayer's Web Site
- Diodorus Siculus, Bibliotheca Historica. Vol 1-2. Immanel Bekker. Ludwig Dindorf. Friedrich Vogel. in aedibus B. G. Teubneri. Leipzig. 1888-1890. Greek text available at the Perseus Digital Library.
- Gaius Julius Hyginus, Fabulae from The Myths of Hyginus translated and edited by Mary Grant. University of Kansas Publications in Humanistic Studies. Online version at the Topos Text Project.
- Hesiod, Catalogue of Women from Homeric Hymns, Epic Cycle, Homerica translated by Evelyn-White, H G. Loeb Classical Library Volume 57. London: William Heinemann, 1914. Online version at theio.com
- Homer, The Iliad with an English Translation by A. T. Murray, Ph.D. in two volumes. Cambridge, MA, Harvard University Press; London, William Heinemann, Ltd. 1924. Online version at the Perseus Digital Library.
- Homer, Homeri Opera in five volumes. Oxford, Oxford University Press. 1920. Greek text available at the Perseus Digital Library.
- Homer, The Odyssey with an English Translation by A.T. Murray, PH.D. in two volumes. Cambridge, MA., Harvard University Press; London, William Heinemann, Ltd. 1919. Online version at the Perseus Digital Library. Greek text available from the same website.
- Parthenius, Love Romances translated by Sir Stephen Gaselee (1882-1943), S. Loeb Classical Library Volume 69. Cambridge, MA. Harvard University Press. 1916. Online version at the Topos Text Project.
- Parthenius, Erotici Scriptores Graeci, Vol. 1. Rudolf Hercher. in aedibus B. G. Teubneri. Leipzig. 1858. Greek text available at the Perseus Digital Library.
- Tzetzes, John, Allegories of the Iliad translated by Goldwyn, Adam J. and Kokkini, Dimitra. Dumbarton Oaks Medieval Library, Harvard University Press, 2015. ISBN 978-0-674-96785-4.
- Tzetzes, John, Book of Histories, Books V–VI translated by Konstantinos Ramiotis from the original Greek of T. Kiessling's edition of 1826. Online version at theio.com.
