= Jason with the Golden Fleece (Thorvaldsen) =

Sculpture by Bertel Thorvaldsen

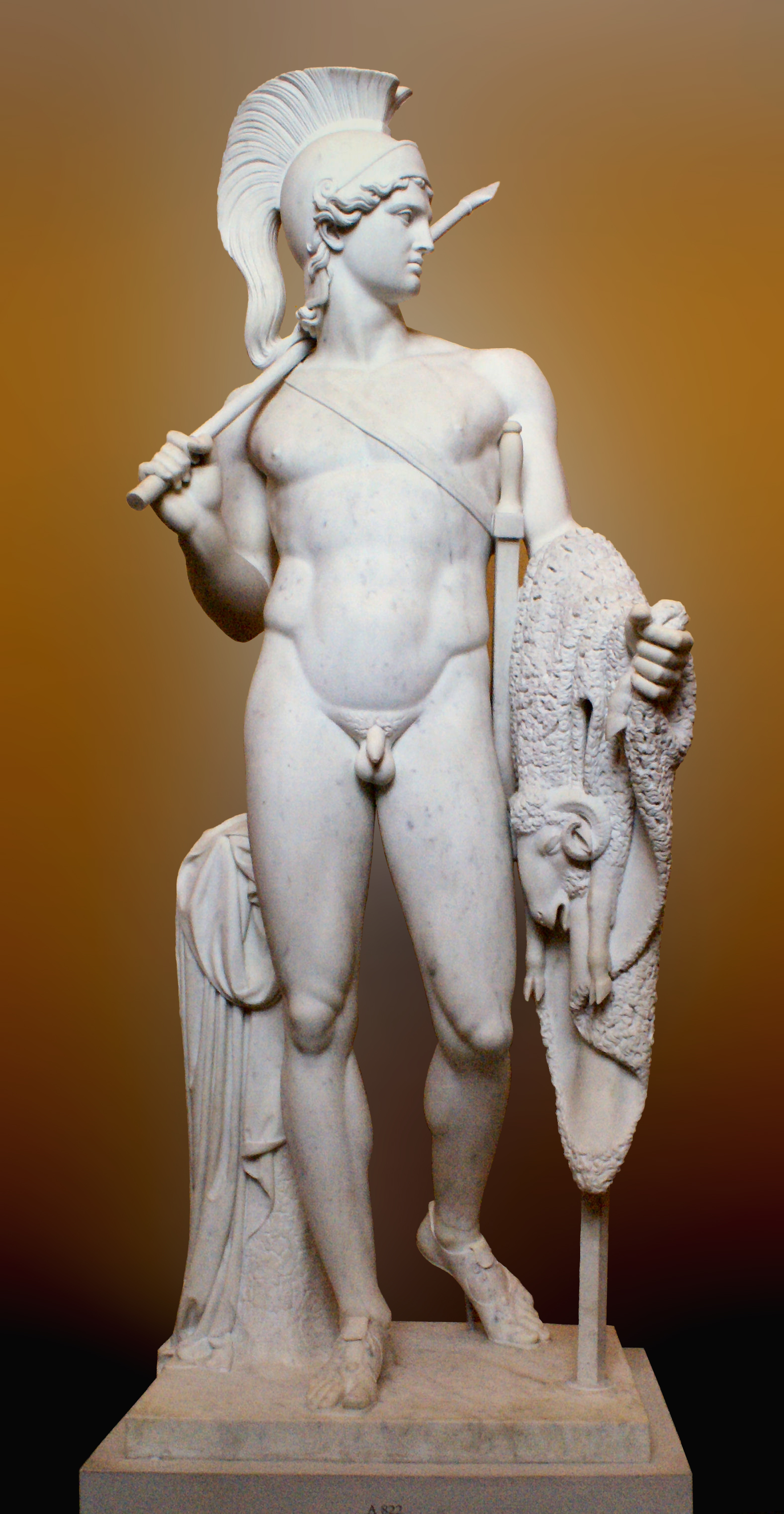
- Artist: Bertel Thorvaldsen
- Year: 1803
- Type: Marble
- Dimensions: 242 cm × 44 cm (95 in × 17 in)
- Location: Thorvaldsen Museum

Jason with the Golden Fleece is a sculpture by Bertel Thorvaldsen. A lifesize clay version created in 1803 is considered to be the artist's first great work. The larger marble statue, reaching a height of 242 cm (95 in), was however not completed until 1828.

== History ==
The sculpture expresses the principle themes of the Ancient Greek myth of Jason recounted by the Alexandrian poet Apollonius of Rhodes, about a hero who traveled on a voyage in search of the Golden Fleece in an attempt to help his father recover his kingdom from King Pelias. A vase painting of Jason from the 3rd century BC depicts Jason removing the Golden Fleece from the sacred tree.

Thorvaldsen's work was initially executed for the Copenhagen Academy to demonstrate his progress; a marble version was subsequently commissioned by Thomas Hope, a wealthy English art patron. When Hope's eventual heirs dispersed his collection at Deepdene, Surrey, in 1917, it was acquired by Copenhagen's Thorvaldsen Museum at auction.

== The work ==
Considered to be Thorvaldsen's breakthrough work, the statue's theme stems from a drawing of Jason and the Golden Fleece by Asmus Jacob Carstens but the esthetic of the nude figure is also inspired by the Apollo Belvedere and Doryphoros, both from antiquity; the archaeologist Georg Zoëga also played an important role, expanding Thorwaldsen's knowledge of ancient history and culture.

== Danish Culture Canon ==
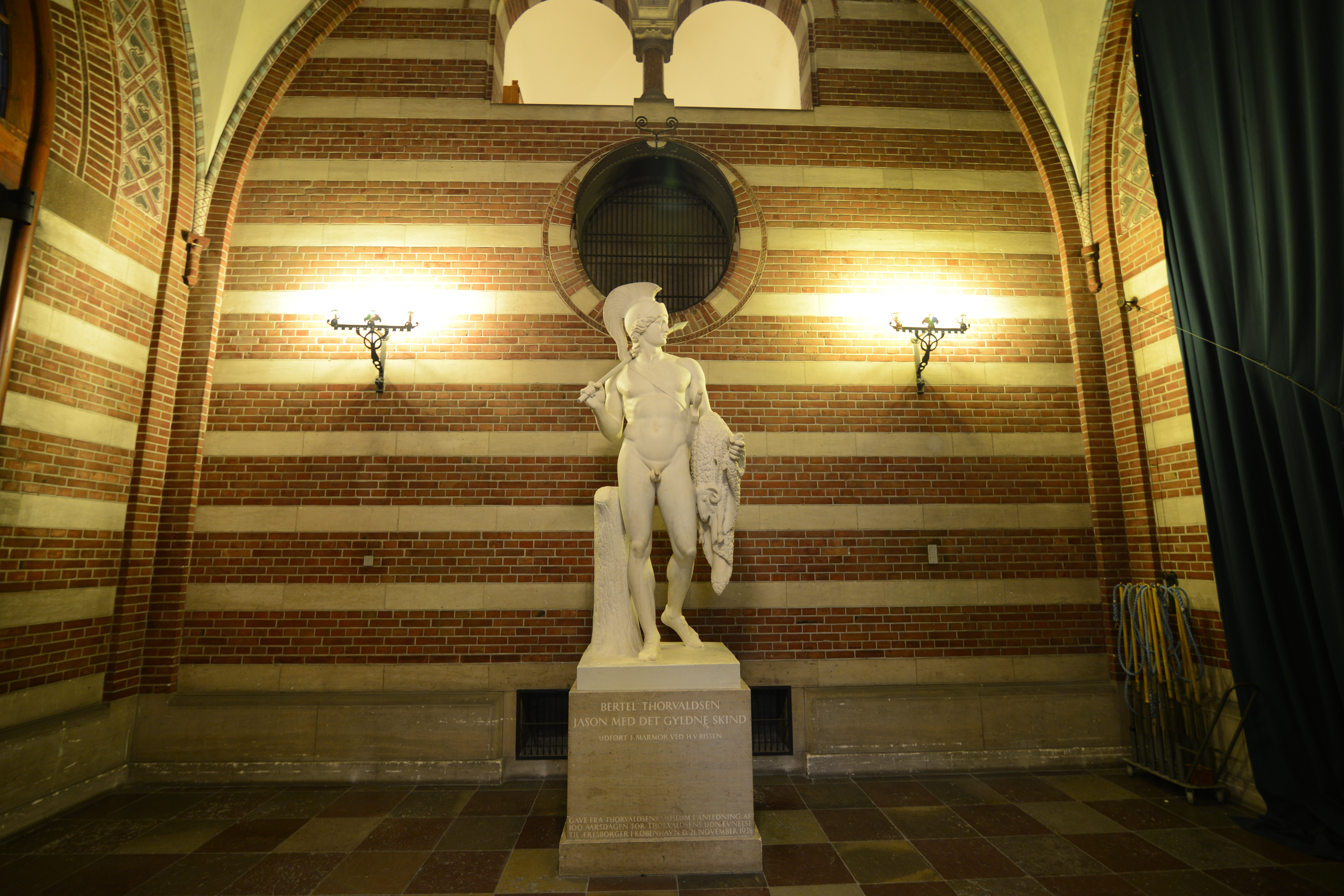
Sculpture in Copenhagen City Hall.

In the first decade of the 21st century, the work was included in the semi-official Danish Culture Canon. In selecting the work, the Culture Canon committee commented on Thorvaldsen's white, sharp, intense and rhythmic lines, evoking a distant, heroic figure. At the time Thorvaldsen created the statue, Denmark was evolving from absolute monarchy into a period of liberalism revolving around the individual citizen's view of the world. Similarly, the sculptor brings his monumental works down to an individual level. His first model of the statue (in clay) was completed in 1803. The marble version followed in 1828.

In the statue, Jason appears to be frozen somewhere between rest and movement. The fight is won and he is returning home with his prey over his arm. Expressing both physical and mental calm, he is the prototype of the classical hero. The sculpture is fully balanced: no matter where your eyes fall, you can find a corresponding element. For example, the lance is reflected in the chest strap, the fleece in tree stump. and the curled tip of the helmet in the horns of the ram.
