= Aeson =

Greek mythical character

- King of Iolcus
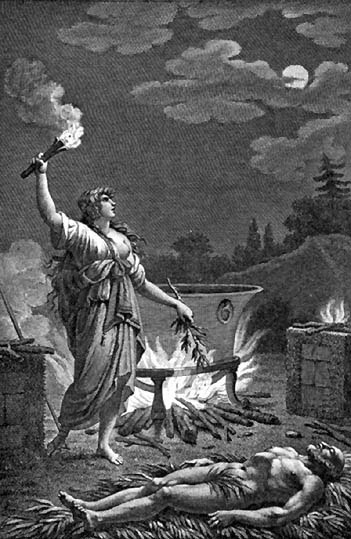
- Medea rejuvenates Aeson by Nicolas-André Monsiau
- Abode: Iolcus

Genealogy
- Parents: Cretheus and Tyro
- Siblings: Amythaon and Pheres
- Consort: Alcimede, Polymele or Polymede
- Offspring: Jason and Promachus

In Greek mythology, Aeson (/ˈiːsɒn/; Ancient Greek: Αἴσων, romanized: Aísōn) was a king of Iolcus in Thessaly. He was the father of the hero Jason. According to one version of the story, he was imprisoned by his half-brother Pelias, and when Pelias intended to kill him he committed suicide. In another story, he was killed by Jason's wife Medea, who subsequently brought him back to life as a young man.

== Family ==
Aeson was the son of Cretheus and Tyro. He had two brothers Pheres and Amythaon. Through his mother Tyro who consorted with the sea god Poseidon, he had two half-brothers, Neleus and Pelias.

Aeson was the father of Jason and Promachus with Alcimede, daughter of Phylacus and Clymene. Other sources say the mother of his children was (1) Polymede or Polymele, or Polypheme a daughter of Autolycus, (2) Amphinome, (3) Theognete, daughter of Laodicus, (4) Rhoeo or (5) Arne or (6) Scarphe.

Comparative table of Aeson's family
Relation	Name	Source						
Relation	Name	(Sch. on) Homer	(Sch. on) Apollonius	Diodorus	Valerius	Apollodorus	Hyginus	Tzetzes
Parentage	Cretheus and Tyro	✓				✓		
Siblings	Amythaon	✓						
Siblings	Pheres	✓						
Wife	Polymele or	✓						✓
Wife	Polypheme or		✓					
Wife	Polymede					✓		✓
Wife	Alcimede		✓		✓		✓	
Wife	Theognete		✓					
Wife	Amphinome			✓				
Wife	Rhoe							✓
Wife	Arne							✓
Wife	Scarphe							✓
Children	Jason	✓	✓	✓	✓	✓	✓	✓
Children	Promachus			✓		✓		

== Mythology ==
Pelias was power-hungry and he wished to gain dominion over all of Thessaly. To this end, he banished Neleus and Pheres and locked Aeson in the dungeons in Iolcus. Aeson sent Jason to Chiron to be educated while Pelias, afraid that he would be overthrown, was warned by an oracle to beware of a man wearing one sandal.

Many years later, Pelias was holding the Olympics in honor of Poseidon when Jason, rushing to Iolcus, lost one of his sandals in a river while helping Hera, in the form of an old woman, cross. When Jason entered Iolcus, he was announced as a man wearing one sandal. Suspicious, Pelias asked him what he (Jason) would do if confronted with the man who would be his downfall. Jason responded that he would send that man after the Golden Fleece. Pelias took that advice and sent Jason to retrieve the Golden Fleece.

During Jason's absence, Pelias intended to kill Aeson. However, Aeson committed suicide by drinking a poison called bull's blood (believed to be an arsenic compound). His wife killed herself as well, and Pelias murdered their infant son Promachus.

Alternatively, Aeson survived until Jason and his new wife, Medea, came back to Iolcus. She slit Aeson's throat, then put his corpse in a pot and Aeson came to life as a young man. She then told Pelias' daughters she would do the same for their father if they killed him. They slit his throat and Medea refused to raise him, so Pelias stayed dead.

== Gallery ==
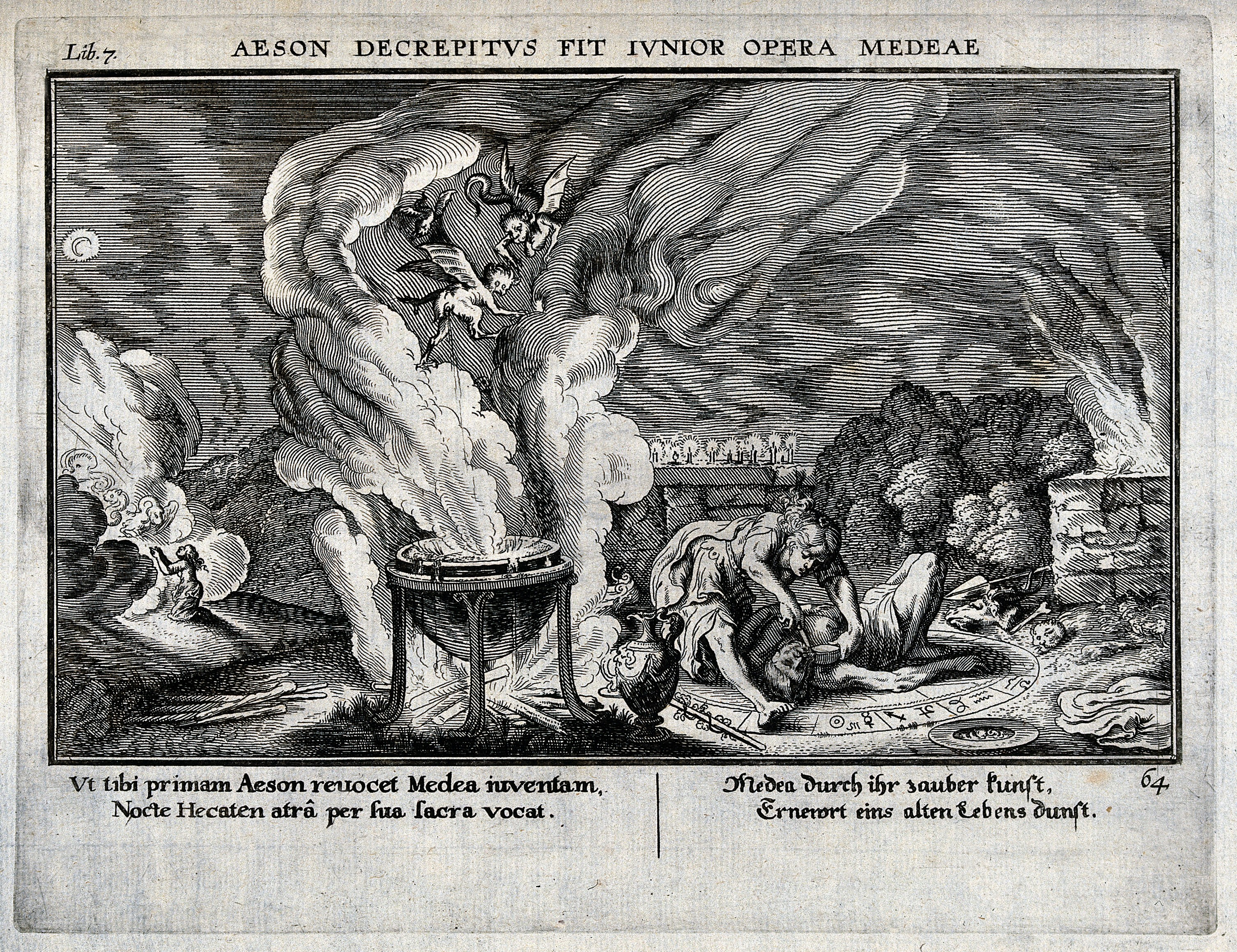
Medea draining the blood of Aeson in order to rejuvenate him

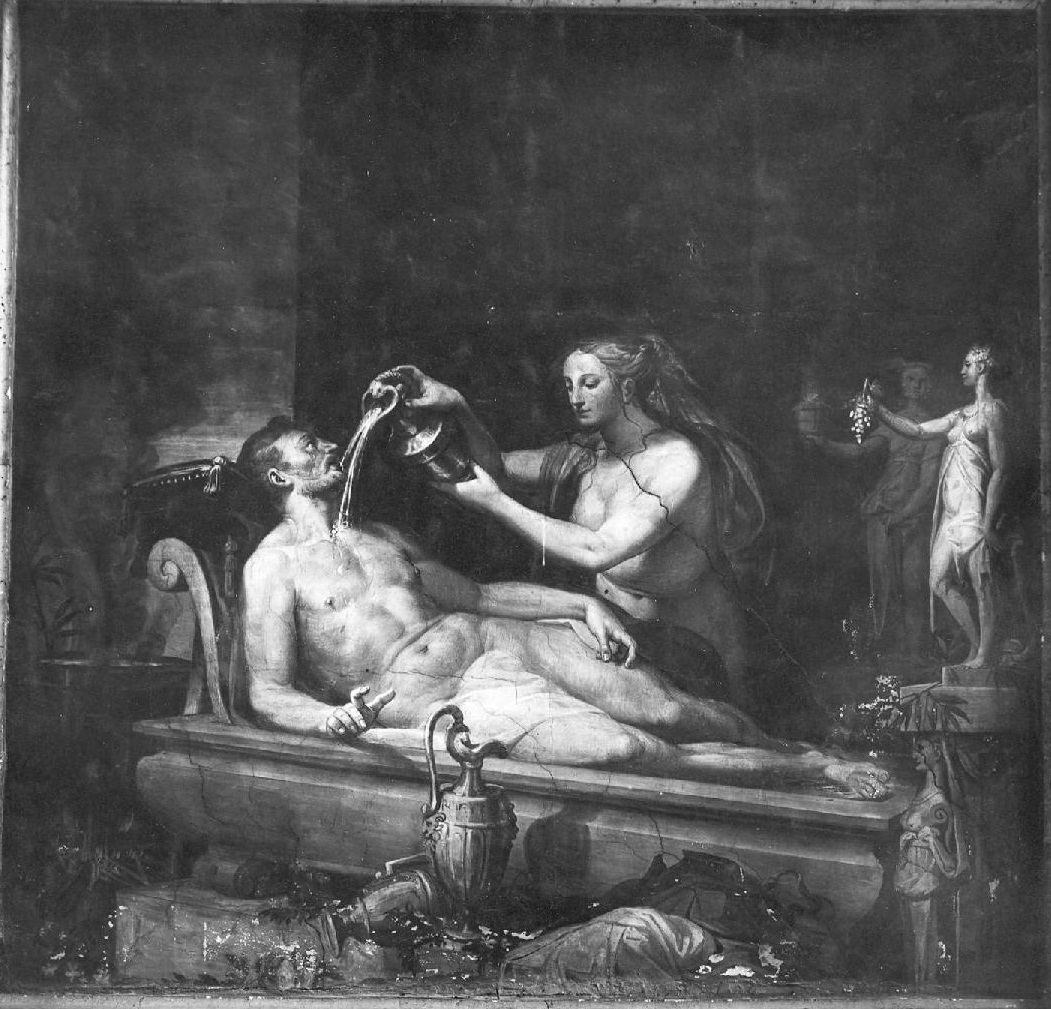
Medea rejuvenates Aeson by Giuseppe Asioli (1811)

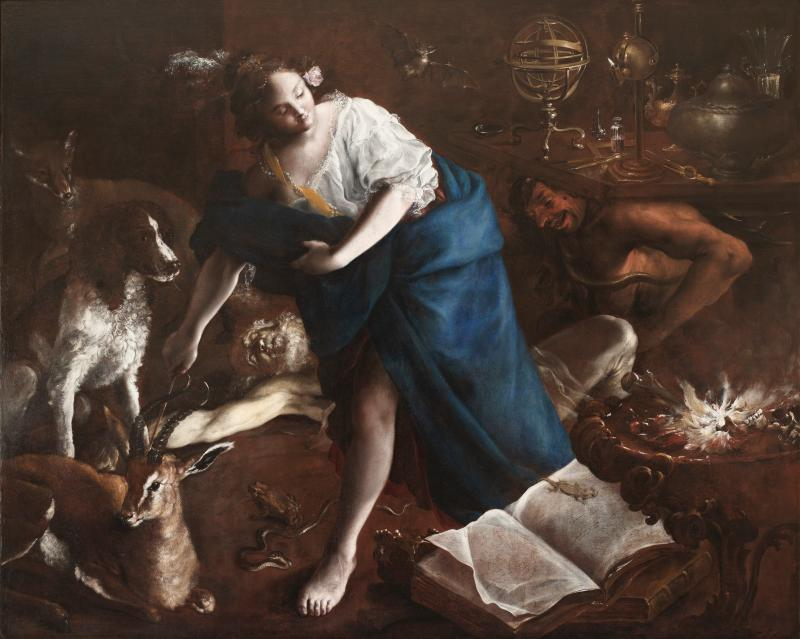
Medea rejuvenates Aeson by Bartolomeo Guidobono (c. 1700)

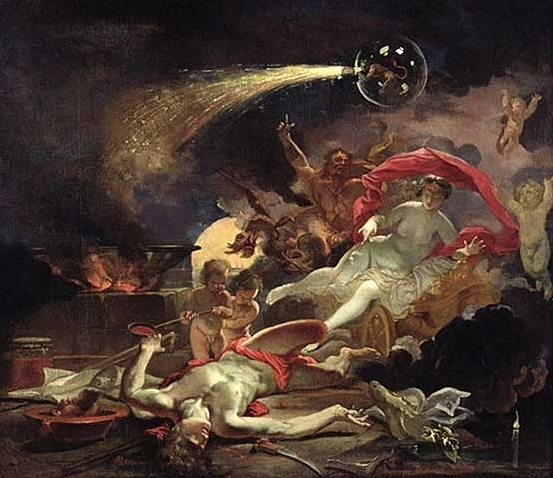
Medea Rejuvenating Eson by Domenicus van Wijnen (17th century)

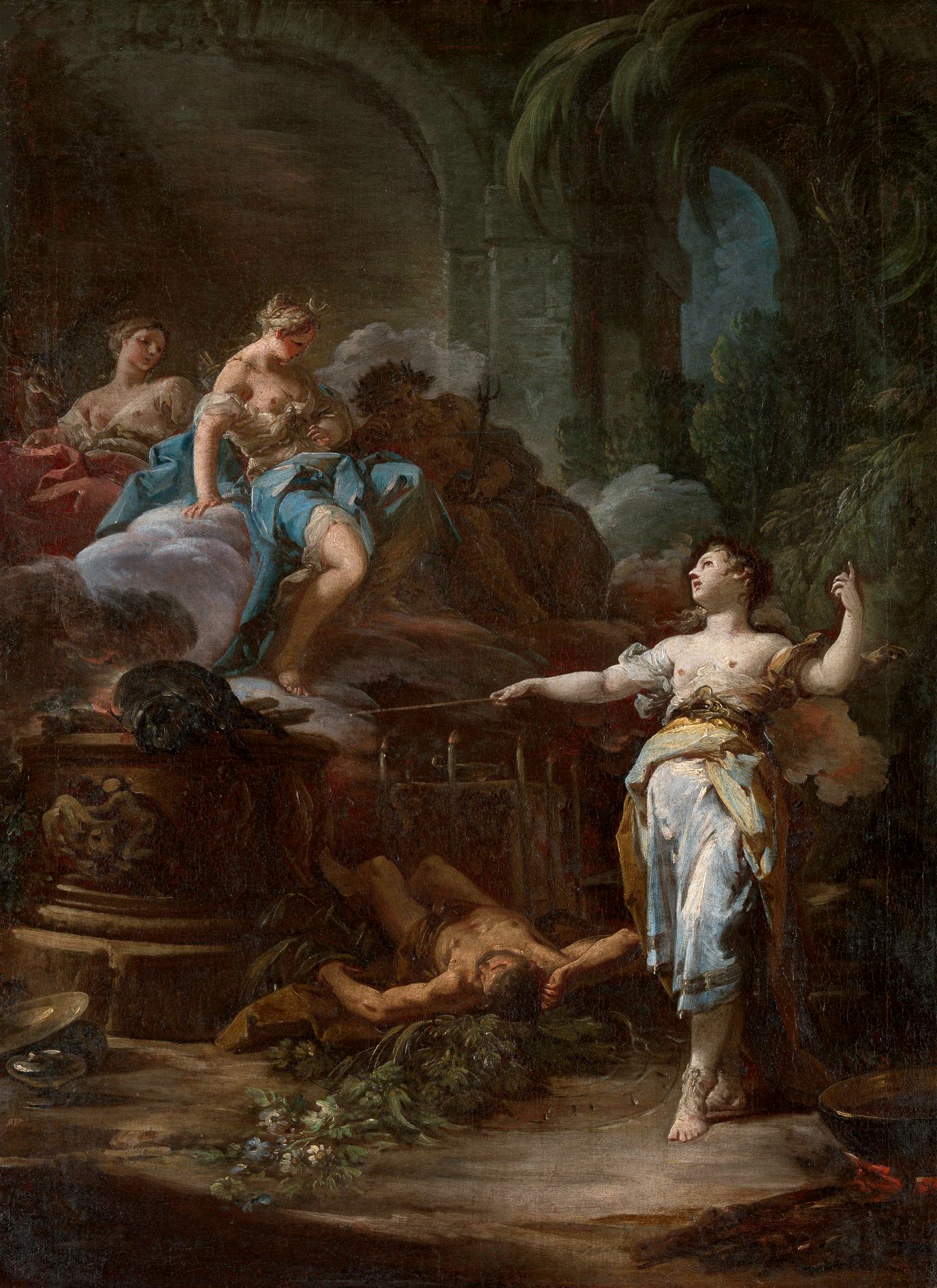
Medea Rejuvenating Aeson by Corrado Giaquinto (1760)
