= Anius =

Character in Greek mythology

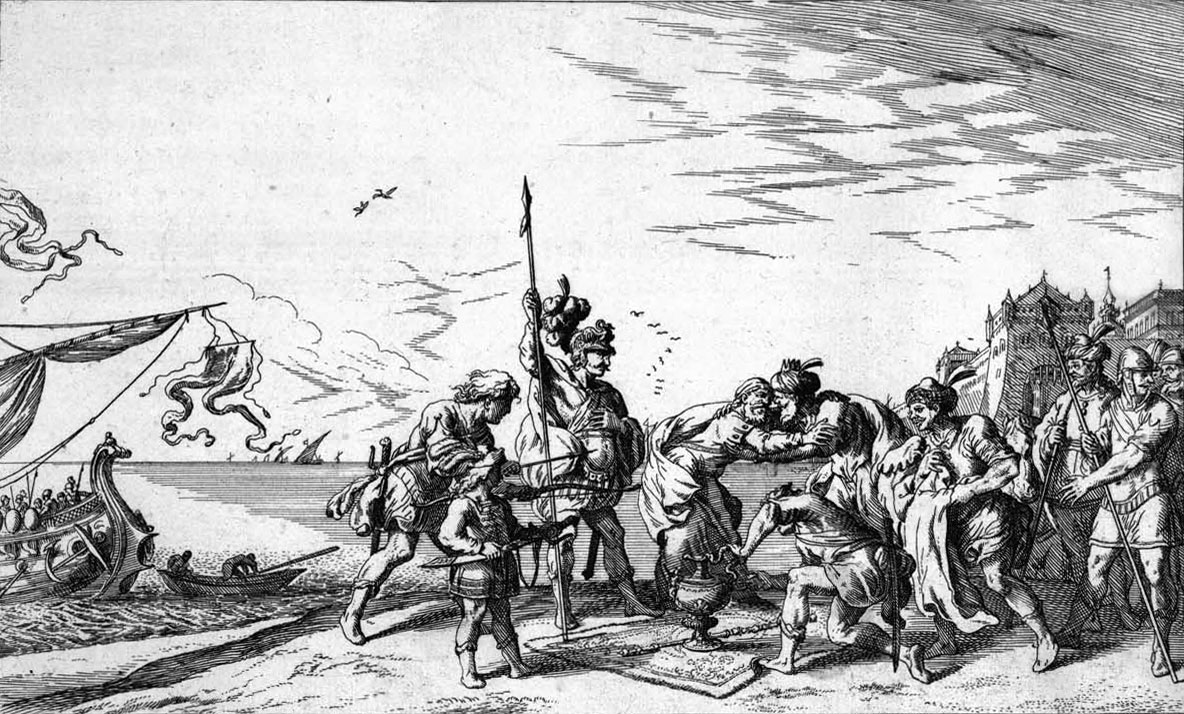
Illustration of Aeneas meeting with Anius by Johann Wilhelm Baur

In Greek mythology, Anius (Ancient Greek: Ἄνιος) was a king of Delos and priest of Apollo.

== Family ==
He was the son of Apollo and Rhoeo, daughter of Staphylus and Chrysothemis.

== Mythology ==
Anius was born either on the island of Delos, which was sacred to his father Apollo, or on Euboea, after the box in which his mother had been placed by Staphylus when he had discovered her pregnancy was washed ashore there. Rhoeo then, placing the baby on Apollo's altar, asked the god to care for it, if it was his. Rhoeo then married Zarex, who thus became the legal father of Anius. Apollo cared for the child Anius for a long time, teaching him the arts of divination and prophecy. Anius later became Apollo's priest and the king of Delos.

Anius had three daughters: Oeno, Spermo, and Elais, known as the Oenotropae; and three sons, Andros, Mykonos, and Thasos. Their mother was Dorippe, a Thracian woman ransomed by Anius for the price of a horse from the pirates who had kidnapped her. Dionysus gave the three daughters the power to change whatever they wanted into wine, wheat, and oil. When the Greeks landed on Delos while on their way to Troy, Anius prophesied that the Trojan War would not be won until the tenth year, and insisted that they stay with him for nine years, promising that his daughters would supply them with aliments during that period. When Agamemnon heard this, he wanted to take the Oenotropae with him by force, to provide his army with food and wine. They prayed to Dionysus, who changed them into doves.

Of Anius's three sons, Andros and Mykonos became eponyms of the islands of Andros and Mykonos respectively. As for Thasos, he was devoured by dogs, and since then it was prohibited to keep dogs on Delos.

Later, Anius, an old friend of Anchises, gave aid to him, his son Aeneas, and his retinue when they were fleeing from Troy and en route to the future site of Rome. According to a rare version of the myth, Aeneas married Anius's daughter Lavinia (or Launa), who, like her father, had prophetic abilities and bore Aeneas a son, who was also named Anius.
