= Alcimede =

Set of mythological Greek characters

In Greek mythology, Alcimede (/ælˈsɪmɪdiː/; Ancient Greek: Ἀλκιμέδη means 'mighty cunning') may refer to the following women:

- Alcimede, daughter of Clymene and Phylacus. She was the mother of Jason by Aeson.
- Alcimede, mother of Phoenix by Amyntor, and possibly of Asydameia and Crantor. In some accounts, she was called Cleobule or Hippodameia.
