= Anavros =

- Native name: Άναυρος (Greek)

Location
- Country: Greece

Physical characteristics
- Mouth
  - location: Pagasetic Gulf
  - coordinates: 39.3494°N 22.9647°E

The river Anavros and Anaurus (Greek: Άναυρος, Ancient Greek: Ἄναυρος, Latin: Anaurus) is a torrent near the ancient city of Iolkos (modern-day Volos), flowing from Mount Pelion into the Pagasetic Gulf. The hero Jason was said to have lost a sandal in its waters, as he ferried the disguised goddess Hera across its stream.
