= Hemithea (mythology) =

Greek mythology term

In Greek mythology, the name Hemithea (Ancient Greek: Ἡμιθέ, lit. 'demigoddess') refers to:

- Hemithea, originally named Molpadia, daughter of Staphylus and Chrysothemis, sister of Parthenos and Rhoeo. According to Diodorus Siculus, she and Parthenos were put in charge of watching after their father's wine but fell asleep while performing this duty, and while they were asleep, the wine jar was broken by the swine their family kept. When the sisters woke up, they saw what had happened. In fear of their father's wrath, threw themselves off a cliff both muttering the name of Apollo. Apollo, who was in love with Rhoeo, would not let her sisters die and granted both of them immortality. Molpadia's name was changed to Hemithea upon her deification. Parthenius makes Hemithea mother of Basileus by Lyrcus; in his version of the story, Hemithea apparently had this name since birth and nothing is said of her deification; however, Staphylus and his daughters' home is located in Bubastus, right where Hemithea came to be worshipped in Diodorus' account. Hemithea was worshipped as a healing goddess at Castabus in Caria, and there is evidence of her sanctuary there as far back as the 7th century BC.
- Hemithea, also known as Amphithea or Leucothea, the sister of Tenes, who was placed into a chest and set into the sea together with her brother after their stepmother Philonome falsely accused Tenes of raping her. They landed on an island which was later named Tenedos, of which Tenes became king. Tenes ended his life in a battle with Achilles, who then attempted to rape Hemithea. She ran off to escape him and was swallowed up in a chasm of the earth.
