= Oenotropae =

Mythological daughters of Anius and Dryope

In Greek mythology, the Oenotropae (Ancient Greek: Οἰνοτρόπαι, "the women who change (into) wine") or Oenotrophae (Ancient Greek: Οἰνοτρόφαι, the "Winegrowers") were the three daughters of Anius and Dryope.

== Names ==
The Oenotropae included: Spermo (Ancient Greek: Σπερμώ, "seed"), who produced grain; Oeno or Oino (Ancient Greek: Οἰνώ, "wine"), who produced wine; and Elais (Ancient Greek: Ἐλαΐς, "olive tree"), who produced olive oil.

== Mythology ==
According to the Bibliotheca, their great-grandfather was Dionysus, and he gave them the power to change water into wine, grass into wheat, and berries into olives. For this reason no one around them ever had to starve. According to other sources, however, the daughters were devotees of Dionysus, and the god rewarded them with the extraordinary ability to produce oil, grain, and wine from the ground or merely by touch.

When the Greek fleet set out to make war in Troy, it was the Oenotropae who stocked their ships, and Agamemnon was so impressed with this that he abducted them in order to feed the Greek army. The daughters escaped, but their brother betrayed them again to the Greeks. As they were about to be bound, however, Dionysus saved them by turning them into white doves.

== See also ==
- Dionysus
- Naming citation for asteroid 13862 Elais
