= Molpadia =

Amazon in Greek mythology

In Greek mythology, Molpadia (Ancient Greek: Μολπαδία means 'divine song') may refer to the two different women:

- Molpadia, an Amazon who was said to have fought for both Antiope and Orithyia. She was a participant in the Attic War, where she witnessed her queen Antiope sustain heavy injuries. Antiope was hurt so seriously that she could not defend herself from Theseus and his retainers. Knowing this, Molpadia killed the queen with an arrow (some say spear), saving her from violation by the Athenian king. Other sources, however, state that she killed Antiope by accident. She was afterwards killed by Theseus, and her tomb was shown at Athens. Like many other Amazons, she may have been named for a goddess, in this case a psychopomp deity. Her name means "Death Song".
- Molpadia, daughter of Staphylus and Chrysothemis, sister of Parthenos and Rhoeo, alternatively called Hemithea. According to Otto Gruppe, Molpadia may have come from Boeotia.
