= 15094 Polymele =

Jupiter trojan asteroid

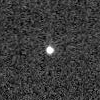
- Polymele imaged by the Hubble Space Telescope in 2018

Discovery
- Discovered by: Catalina Sky Survey
- Discovery site: Catalina Station
- Discovery date: 17 November 1999

Designations
- Pronunciation: /pɒlɪˈmiːliː/
- Named after: Polymele (Greek mythology)
- Alternative designations: 1999 WB_{2} · 1997 WR_{57}
- Minor planet category: Jupiter trojan (Greek camp)

Orbital characteristics
- Epoch 25 February 2023 (JD 2460000.5)
- Uncertainty parameter 0
- Earliest precovery date: 30 November 1951
- Aphelion: 5.682 AU
- Perihelion: 4.679 AU
- Semi-major axis: 5.180 AU
- Eccentricity: 0.0968
- Orbital period (sidereal): 11.79 yr (4,307 d)
- Mean anomaly: 44.314°
- Mean motion: 0° 5^{m} 0.936^{s} / day
- Inclination: 12.981°
- Longitude of ascending node: 50.319°
- Argument of perihelion: 4.772°
- Known satellites: 1 ("Shaun")
- Jupiter MOID: 0.2445 AU
- T_{Jupiter}: 2.940

Physical characteristics
- Dimensions: 27.0 × 24.4 × 10.4 km (± 2.0 × 1.6 × 1.6 km)
- Mean diameter: 21.075±0.136 km
- Mean density: 0.7–1 g/cm^{3} (assumed)
- Synodic rotation period: 5.8607±0.0005 h 11.5±0.1 h
- Axial tilt: 170.9° (wrt ecliptic)
- Pole ecliptic longitude: 231.8°±4.5°
- Pole ecliptic latitude: −80.9°±2.1°
- Geometric albedo: 0.073; 0.091±0.017
- Spectral type: P B–V = 0.652±0.065; V–R = 0.477±0.065; V–I = 0.799±0.068
- Absolute magnitude (H): 11.60; 11.691±0.002 (S/R)

15094 Polymele /pɒləˈmiːliː/ is a primitive Jupiter trojan from the Greek camp, approximately 21 kilometers (13 miles) in diameter. It is a target of the Lucy mission with a close flyby planned to occur in September 2027. It was discovered on 17 November 1999, by astronomers with the Catalina Sky Survey at Mount Lemmon Observatory, Arizona, in the United States. The P-type asteroid has a rotation period of 5.9 hours and highly flattened shape. It was named after Polymele from Greek mythology, the wife of Menoetius and the mother of Patroclus. In 2022, it was reported to have a natural satellite approximately 5 kilometers (3.1 miles) in diameter.

== Orbit and classification ==
Polymele is a Jupiter trojan asteroid orbiting in the leading Greek camp at Jupiter's L_{4} Lagrangian point, 60° ahead of the gas giant's orbit (see Trojans in astronomy). It orbits the Sun at a distance of 4.7–5.7 AU once every 11 years and 9 months (4,289 days; semi-major axis of 5.17 AU). Its orbit has an eccentricity of 0.09 and an inclination of 13° with respect to the ecliptic. The asteroid's observation arc begins 48 years prior to its official discovery observation at Mount Lemmon, with a precovery taken at Palomar Observatory in 1951, and published by the Digitized Sky Survey later on.

== Naming ==
This minor planet was named after Polymele, the daughter of Peleus from Greek mythology. According to the Latin author Gaius Julius Hyginus (c. 64 BC – AD 17), she is the wife of the Argonaut Menoetius and the mother of Patroclus, who participated in the Trojan War. Polymele is also known as "Philomela"; that name was previously used for the asteroid 196 Philomela. The approved naming citation was published by the Minor Planet Center on 22 February 2016 (M.P.C. 98711).

== Physical characteristics ==
Polymele has been characterized as a primitive P-type asteroid by the investigators of the Lucy mission. P-type asteroids are known for their low albedo. It has a V–I color index of 0.799, which is lower than that for most larger Jupiter trojans (see table below).

=== Size, shape, and albedo ===
According to the survey carried out by the NEOWISE mission of NASA's Wide-field Infrared Survey Explorer, Polymele measures 21.075 kilometers in diameter and its surface has an albedo of 0.091, while in 2018, Marc Buie published an albedo of 0.073 and an absolute magnitude of 11.691 in the S- and/or R band. The Collaborative Asteroid Lightcurve Link assumes a standard albedo for a carbonaceous asteroid of 0.057 and calculates a larger diameter of 26.64 kilometers based on an absolute magnitude of 11.6.

On 27 March 2022, multiple astronomers observed a stellar occultation by Polymele, which revealed an apparently elongated projected shape with projected dimensions of 26.2 km × 12.8 km (16.3 mi × 8.0 mi). Additional occultation observations of Polymele from 2020 to 2023 revealed that Polymele's true shape is a highly flattened disk with dimensions 27.0 km × 24.4 km × 10.4 km (16.8 mi × 15.2 mi × 6.5 mi), similar to the large flat lobe of the Kuiper belt object 486958 Arrokoth. This unusual flattened shape of Polymele implies that it had retained its original shape from when it formed by accretion.

=== Rotation ===
In March 2016, a rotational lightcurve of Polymele was obtained from photometric observations by Marc Buie and colleagues. Lightcurve analysis gave a rotation period of 5.8607±0.0005 hours with a small brightness amplitude of 0.09±0.03 magnitude (U=2-), which indicates the body is being viewed pole-on. Previously, the Lucy mission team published spin rates of 6.1 and 4 hours, respectively.

In a 2021 paper, the Lucy team published a rotation period of 11.5±0.1 hours, implying that the previous period may have been an alias.

The resolved observation of Polymele's shape in multiple occultation events allowed the Lucy team to determine the orientation of Polymele's rotational pole. Polymele's rotational north pole points toward ecliptic latitude –80.9°, which corresponds to an axial tilt of 170.9° with respect to the ecliptic, making Polymele a retrograde rotator.

=== Satellite ===
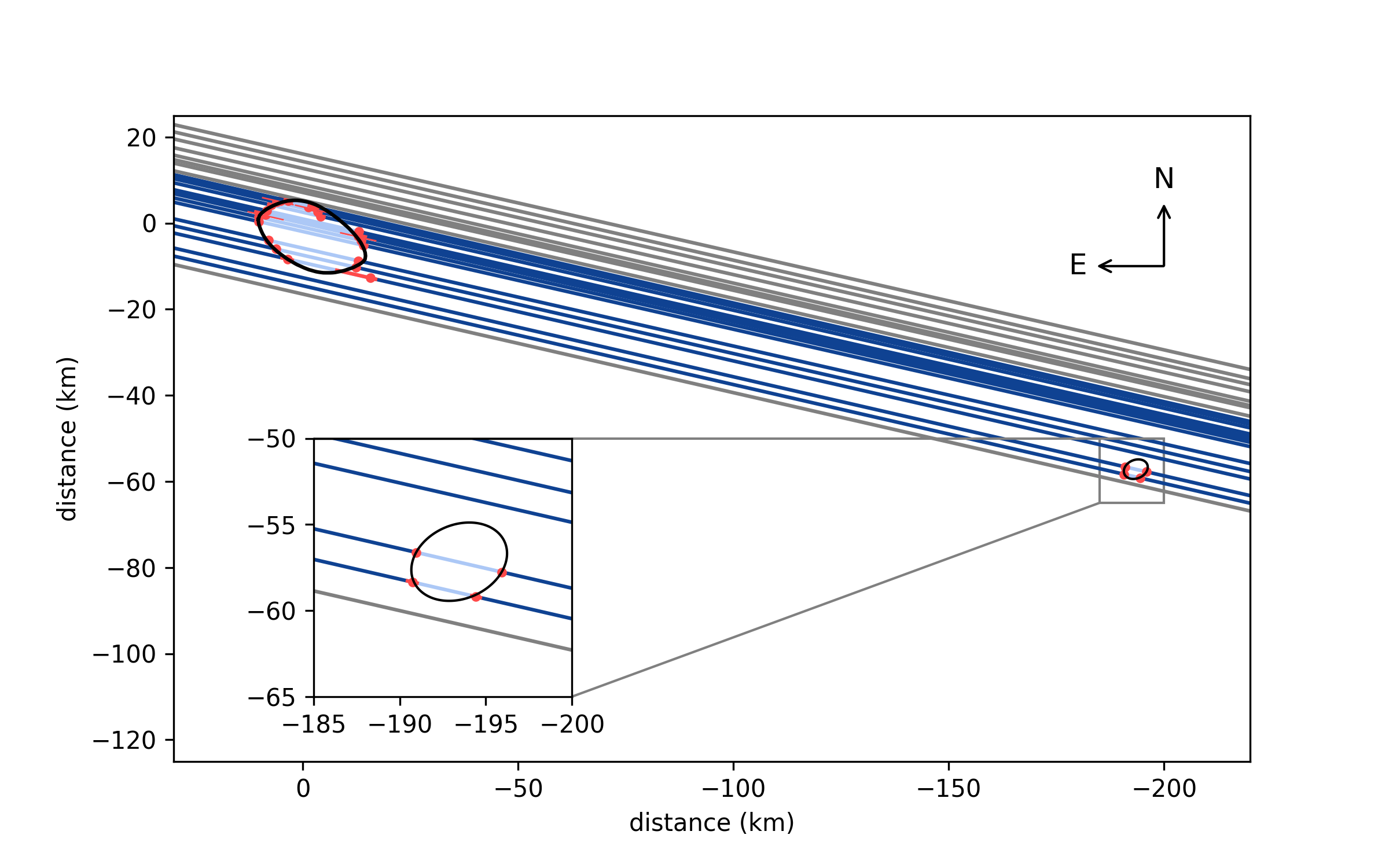
Discovery of Polymele's satellite in the 27 March 2022 occultation

Diameter specifications for Polymele's satellite
Year	Dimensions (km)	Source
2022	5.0	M. Buie u. a.

Following observations of an occultation on 26 March 2022, the Lucy mission team reported the discovery of a natural satellite around Polymele. The satellite is a smaller asteroid about 5–6 kilometers (3.1–3.7 miles) in diameter, orbiting nearly in the equatorial plane of Polymele at a distance of 204.4 ± 2.6 km (127.0 ± 1.6 mi). Assuming Polymele has a density of 0.7–1 g/cm^{3}, the satellite should have an orbital period between 14.4 and 16.6 days. It will not be assigned a formal name until further observations determine its orbit. The Lucy team refers to the companion by the temporary informal name "Shaun", after Aardman Animations' animated sheep. The satellite was detected again in an occultation on 4 February 2023, in the largest organized occultation expedition in history. Nearly 200 astronomers across two continents participated in the campaign.

== Exploration ==
=== Lucy mission target ===
Polymele is planned to be visited by the Lucy spacecraft which launched in 2021. The flyby is scheduled for 15 September 2027, and will approach the asteroid to a distance of 415 km (258 mi) at a relative velocity of 6 km/s (13,000 mph).
