= Peliades =

Lost tragedy by Euripides

Peliades or Daughters of Pelias (Ancient Greek: Πελιάδες) is the earliest known tragedy by Euripides; he entered it into the Dionysia of 455 BC but did not win. In Greek mythology, the Peliades were the daughters of Pelias.

== History ==
The Peliades recounts the story of the daughters of Pelias murdering their father under the instruction of Medea, who claims to be able to make him young again, working on behalf of Jason and the Argonauts. Classicist Herbert Mierow suggested that Euripides' telling of the tragedy was influenced by Aeschylus's play Agamemnon that was produced three years earlier in 458 BC, based on the shared opening on a fire as a signal that initiates the action of both plays.
