= Castabus =

Town of ancient Caria

Coordinates: 36°47′04″N 28°09′24″E

Castabus or Kastabos (Ancient Greek: Κάσταβος) was a town of ancient Caria. Diodorus says Hemithea was carried off by Apollo and deified at Castabus. The city came under Rhodian control, as part of the Rhodian Peraia, no later than 300 BC. In 1960, an ancient Greek sanctuary (1st century BC) dedicated to the demigod Hemithea was discovered near the city by the British archaeologists J.M. Cook and W.H. Plommer. The sanctuary consists of a temple, a theatre and numerous houses. The theatre follows the common typical layout of Greek theatres, with a wide koilon (auditorium) and a small scene-building.

Its site is located near Pazarlık, Asiatic Turkey.
