= Chrysothemis (daughter of Carmanor) =

Greek mythological figure

Chrysothemis or Khrysothemis (Ancient Greek: Χρυσόθεμις, romanized: Khrysothemis, lit. 'golden law') is a minor figure in Greek mythology. She was the daughter of Carmanor, a Cretan priest.

== Family ==
Chrysothemis was the daughter of Carmanor of Crete, the priest who purified Apollo and Artemis after the killing of Python, a chthonic serpent deity that presided over the Delphic oracle, and the sister of the god Eubuleus. Most sources do not indicate the name of his mother, but some say it was the goddess Demeter.

== Mythology ==
Chrysothemis has been called a poet and is named the as first to win the oldest contest of the Pythian Games. It was a contest where competitors each sang a hymn to the gods, and she sang a hymn to Apollo. She may have also been a demigoddess of agriculture.

According to Diodorus Siculus, she married the argonaut Staphylus, son of Dionysus and Ariadne. Together they had three daughters: Parthenos, Rhoeo and Molpadia. Rhoeo became Apollo's lover and fell pregnant with his son, Anius. When Staphylus found out she was pregnant, he did not believe Apollo was the father. In anger, he locked her in a wooden chest and cast her out into the sea to die. She was saved when Apollo intervened, and safely washed up on the shores of Delos. Parthenos and Molpadia also experienced great misfortune due to their father. While they were watching their father's wine, a drink that had only been recently discovered by men, they fell asleep. While they slept, pigs came in and broke the jars, and the wine was lost. Fearing their father's wrath, the sisters attempted suicide by jumping off a cliff into the sea. However, Apollo, out of his love for their sister, saved them and brought them to Chersonesus where they became local goddesses. There, Molpadia changed her name to Hemithea.

According to Hyginus, Chrysothemis herself was Apollo's lover, with whom she had the daughter Parthenos, who died young and was transformed into the Virgo constellation by Apollo. Additionally, according to Pausanias, Chrysothemis had a son by Apollo, Philammon.
