= Pelias =

King of Iolcus in Greek mythology

- King of Iolcus
- Member of the Deucalionids
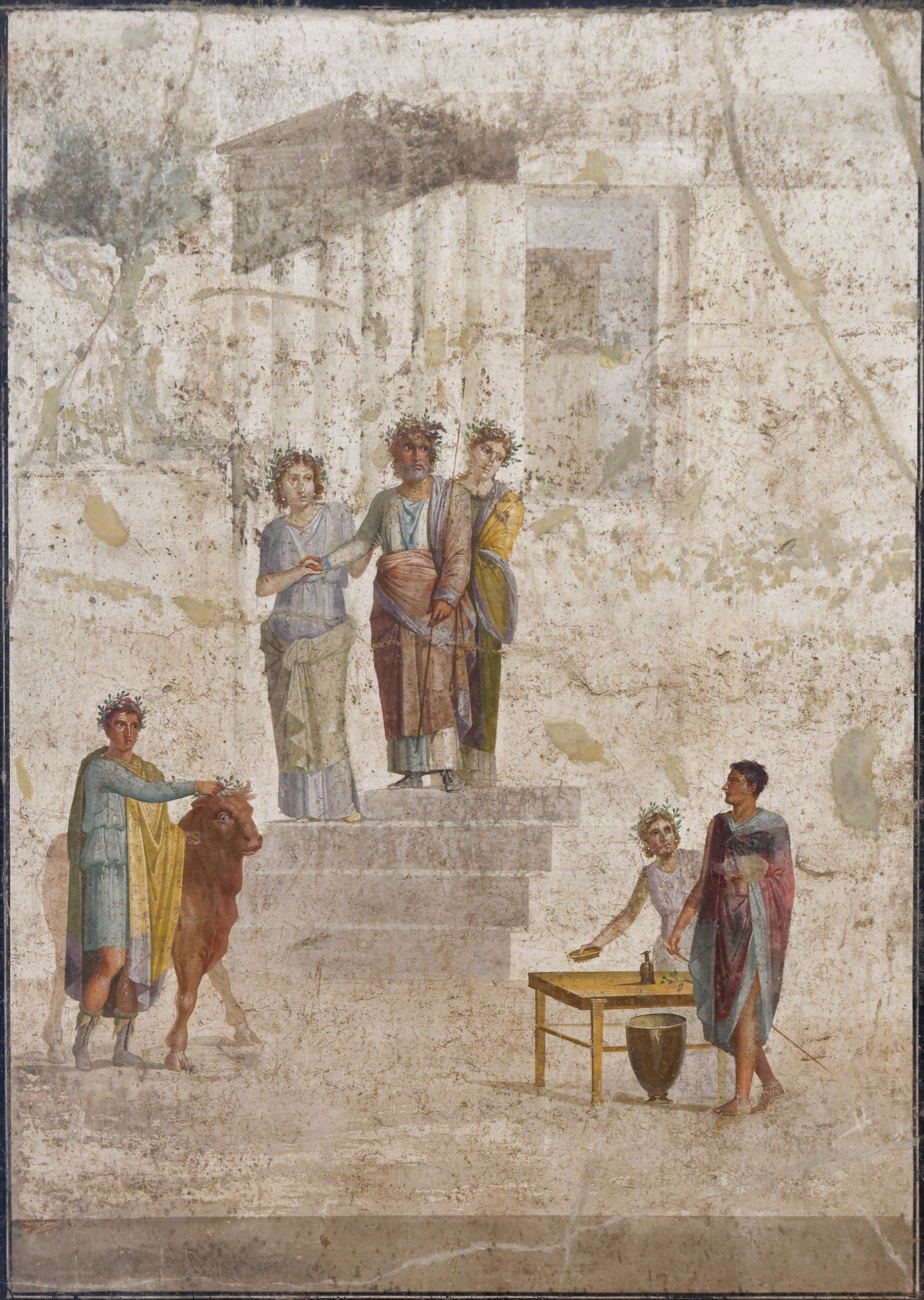
- Pelias, king of Iolcos, stops on the steps of a temple as he recognises young Jason by his missing sandal; Roman fresco from Pompeii, 1st century AD.
- Predecessor: Aeson
- Successor: Acastus
- Abode: Iolcus

Genealogy
- Parents: Poseidon and Tyro
- Siblings: Neleus
- Consort: Anaxibia or Phylomache
- Offspring: Acastus, Pisidice, Alcestis, Pelopia, Hippothoe, Amphinome, Evadne, Asteropeia, Antinoe and Medusa

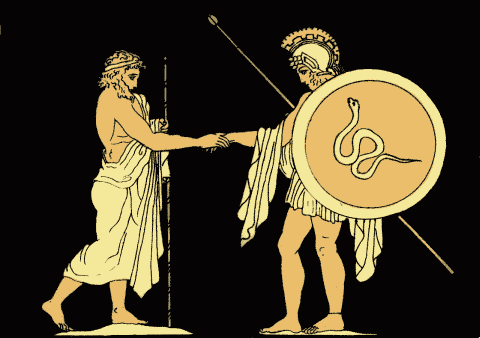
Pelias sends forth Jason, in an 1879 illustration from Stories from the Greek Tragedians by Alfred Church.

Pelias (/ˈpiːliæs/ PEE-lee-ass; Ancient Greek: Πελίας) was king of Iolcus in Greek mythology. He was the one who sent Jason on the quest for the Golden Fleece.

== Family ==
Pelias was the son of Tyro and Poseidon. His wife is recorded as either Anaxibia, daughter of Bias, or Phylomache, daughter of Amphion. He was the father of Acastus, Pisidice, Alcestis, Pelopia, Hippothoe, Amphinome, Evadne, Asteropeia, Antinoe and Medusa. These daughters are sometimes called collectively as the Peliades after their father.

== Early years ==
Tyro was married to King Cretheus of Iolcus, with whom she had three sons, Aeson, Pherês, and Amythaon, but she loved Enipeus, a river god. She pursued Enipeus, who refused her advances. One day, Poseidon, filled with lust for Tyro, disguised himself as Enipeus and lay with her; from their union were born twin sons, Pelias and Neleus.

Tyro exposed her sons on a mountain to die, but they were found by a herdsman who raised them as his own, as one story goes, or they were raised by a maid. When they reached adulthood, Pelias and Neleus found Tyro and killed her stepmother Sidero for having mistreated her (Sidero hid in a temple dedicated to Hera but Pelias killed her anyway, causing Hera's undying hatred of Pelias).

Pelias was power-hungry and he wished to gain dominion over all of Thessaly. To this end, he banished Neleus and Pherês, and locked Aeson in the dungeons in Iolcus (by the modern city of Volos). While in the dungeons, Aeson married and had several children, most famously, Jason. Aeson sent Jason away from Iolcus in fear that Pelias would have him killed as a potential heir to the throne.

Jason grew in the care of Chiron the centaur, on the slopes of Mount Pelion, to be educated while Pelias, fearing that he would be overthrown, was warned by an oracle to beware a man wearing one sandal.

== Quest for the Golden Fleece ==
Many years later, Pelias offered a sacrifice by the sea in honor of Poseidon. Jason, who was summoned with many others to take part in the sacrifice, lost one of his sandals in the flooded river Anaurus while rushing to Iolcus. In Virgil's Aeneid and Hyginus's Fabulae (13), Hera/Juno disguised herself as an old woman, whom Jason helped across the river when he lost his sandal.

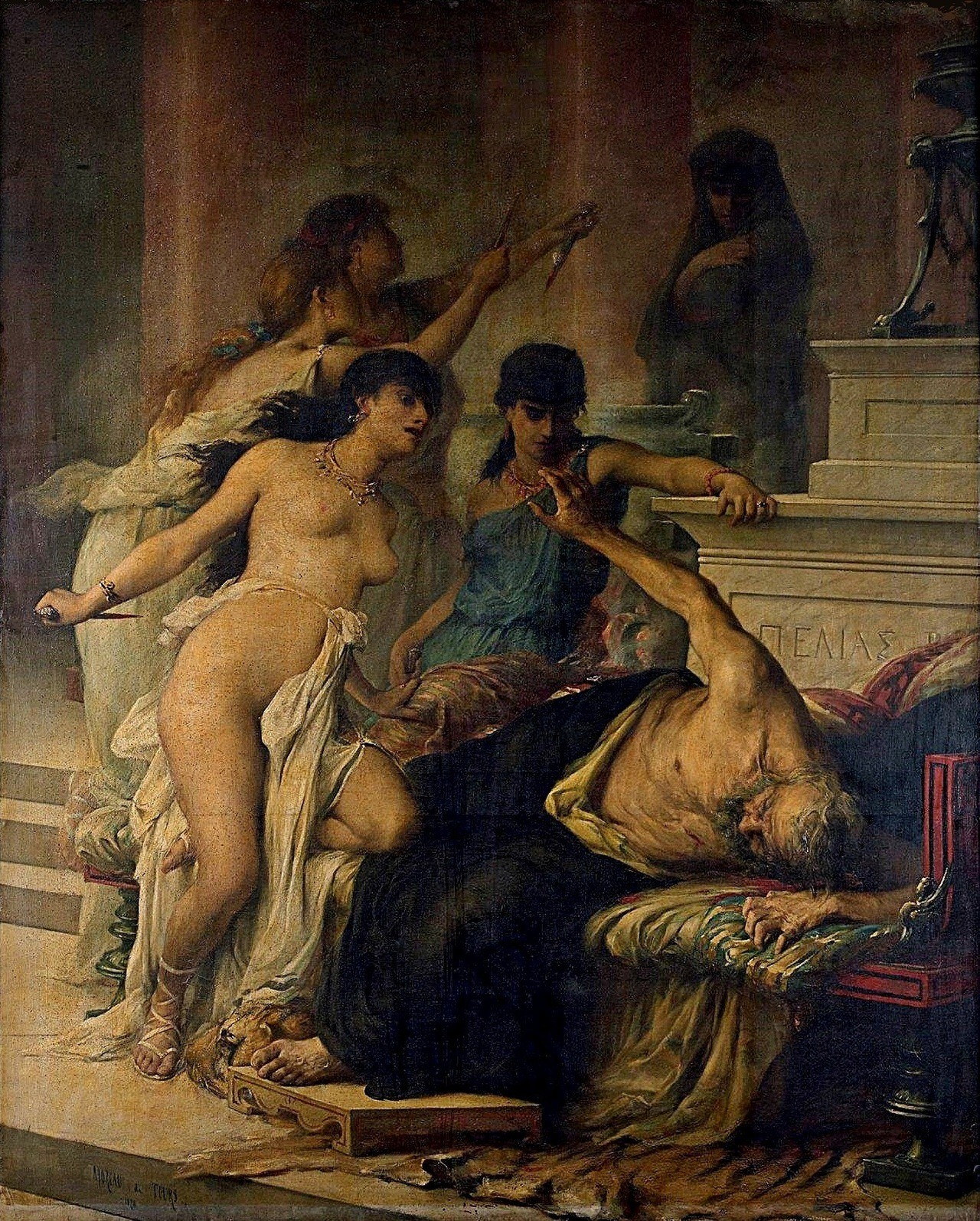
The Murder of Pelias by His Daughters, Georges Moreau de Tours (1878)

When Jason entered Iolcus, he was announced as a man wearing one sandal. Fearful, Pelias asked Jason what he would do if confronted with the man who would be his downfall. Jason responded that he would send that man after the Golden Fleece. Pelias took Jason's advice and sent him to retrieve the Golden Fleece. It would be found at Colchis, in a grove sacred to Ares, the god of war. Though the Golden Fleece simply hung on an oak tree, this was a seemingly impossible task, as an ever-watchful dragon guarded it.

Jason made preparations by commanding the shipwright Argus to build a ship large enough for fifty men, which he would eventually call the Argo. These heroes who would join his quest were known as the Argonauts. Upon their arrival, Jason requested the Golden Fleece from the king of Colchis, Aeëtes. Aeëtes demanded that Jason must first yoke a pair of fire-breathing bulls to a plough and sow dragon's teeth into the earth. Medea, daughter of Aeëtes, fell in love with Jason, and being endowed with magical powers, aided him in his completion of the difficult task. She cast a spell to put the dragon to sleep, enabling Jason to obtain the Golden Fleece from the oak tree. Jason, Medea, and the Argonauts fled Colchis and began their journey home to Thessaly along with Medea's brother Absyrtus.

== Death ==
During Jason's absence, Pelias thought the Argo had sunk, and this was what he told Aeson and Promachus, who committed suicide by drinking poison. However, it is unknown but possible that the two were both killed directly by Pelias.

When Jason and Medea returned, Pelias still refused to give up his throne. Medea conspired to have Pelias's own daughters (the Peliades) kill him. She told them she could turn an old ram into a young ram by cutting up the old ram and boiling it. During the demonstration, a live, young ram jumped out of the pot. Excited, the girls cut their father into pieces and threw them into a pot, in the expectation that he would emerge rejuvenated. Pelias, of course, did not survive.

As he was now an accessory to a terrible crime, Jason was still not made king. Pelias's son Acastus later banished Jason and Medea, to Corinth, and so reclaimed the kingdom.

An alternate telling of the story has Medea slitting the throat of Jason's father Aeson, who she then really does revive as a much younger man; Pelias's daughters then slit their father's throat after she promises to do the same for him, and she merely breaks her word and leaves him dead.

At the funeral games held in honor of Pelias, Atalanta defeated Peleus in a wrestling match. This match became a popular subject in Greek art.
