= Promachus =

Greek name

In Greek mythology and history, Promachus (/ˈprɒməkəs/; Ancient Greek: Πρόμαχος; English translation: "who leads in battle" or "champion") is a name that refers to several different people.

Mythology

- Promachus, son of Aeson. King of Iolcus, and Alcimede or Amphinome. He was killed by Pelias along with his father, while his older brother, Jason, searched for the Golden Fleece.
- Promachus, son of Parthenopaeus and one of the Epigoni, who attacked the city of Thebes to avenge their fathers, the Seven against Thebes, who died attempting the same thing. Promachus died in the attack, and was buried nearby at Teumessus.
- Promachus, son of Alegenor, from Boeotia, a Greek warrior in the Iliad who was killed by Acamas.
- Promachus, son of Heracles and Psophis, brother of Echephron.
- Promachus, one of the Suitors of Penelope from Ithaca along with 11 other wooers. He, with the other suitors, was killed by Odysseus with the assistance of Eumaeus, Philoetius, and Telemachus.
- Promachus of Knossos, who was desperate to win the love of the handsome youth Leucocomas. He risked his life facing various challenges to win notable prizes, but Leucocomas remained indifferent. Finally, Promachus won a famous helmet for a prize and put it on the head of another youth in the presence of Leucocomas: the latter was overcome with jealousy and stabbed himself. In other authors he is called Euxynthetus.
- The name Promachus, "the champion", also occurs as a surname of Athena in Athens, Heracles at Thebes, and of Hermes at Tanagra.

History

- Promachus of Macedon, a common soldier who died of alcohol abuse.
- Promachus of Pellene, a pankration champion.

== Other uses ==
- Promachus (fly), a genus of flies
- 173117 Promachus, Jupiter Trojan asteroid
