= Sinoessa =

Nymph in Greek mythology

In Greek mythology, Sinoessa (Ancient Greek: Σινόεσσα, romanized: Sinóessa), later called Arne (/ˈɑːrniː/; Ancient Greek: Ἄρνη, romanized: Árnē), is a nymph and a nurse of the god Poseidon during his infancy. In a lesser-known variation of the myth, Sinoessa hid the young Poseidon from his father Cronus. The myth is preserved in medieval Greek sources both of which attribute it to a lost Corinthiaca by Theseus.

== Mythology ==
Sinoessa was a nymph who was entrusted with the care of the infant Poseidon by his mother, the Titaness Rhea. When the boy's father Cronus came looking for him (Cronus swallowed his children out of fear that they would dethrone him once they got older), Sinoessa protected the young god by denying (απηρνήσατο in ancient Greek, apernḗsato) that she had him at all in the first place. For that reason she was called Arne afterwards. This was also the reason why the city of Arne in Boeotia was renamed from its previous name, Sinoessa.

== Analysis ==
According to Noel Robertson, judging from a similar epithet of the god Pan and a related Arcadian myth (in which Rhea set the newborn Poseidon down among a flock of sheep—ἀρνός in Greek, arnós—near the spring Arne), Tzetzes plundered in ascribing the myth to the Boeotian Arne, as evidence points to it actually being Arcadian in origin. Classical philologist Karl Kerenyi describes the Sinoessa variation (which links the name to the word for 'deny', rather than the one for sheep) as 'certainly late and incorrect.'

== See also ==
Other nurses of gods in Greek mythology:

- Neda, nurse of Zeus
- Cyllene, nurse of Hermes
- Macris, nurse of Hera

== Bibliography ==
- Anonymous, Etymologicum Magnum, edited by Friedrich Sylburg. 1816. Available on the Internet Archive.
- Bell, Robert E. (1991). Women of Classical Mythology: A Biographical Dictionary. ABC-Clio. ISBN 9780874365818.
- Kerenyi, Karl (1951). The Gods of the Greeks. Translated by Norman Cameron. London, New York: Thames & Hudson.
- Robertson, Noel (1987). "The Nones of July and Roman Weather Magic". Museum Helveticum. 44 (1).
- Tzetzes, John, Lycophronis Alexandra. Vol. II: Scholia Continens, edited by Eduard Scheer, Berlin, Weidmann, 1881. Available on the Internet Archive.
