= Alcimede (mother of Jason) =

Greek Mythology

In Greek mythology, Alcimede (/ælˈsɪmɪdiː/; Ancient Greek: Ἀλκιμέδη, lit. 'mighty cunning') was one of the matrilineal Minyan daughters, the daughter of Clymene, Minyas' daughter.

== Family ==
Alcimede's father was King Phylacus, eponymous founder of Phylace, and sister of Iphiclus and Clymenus.

She was the mother of Jason by Aeson, King of Iolcus. She met Aeson in the caves below Iolcus in Thessaly, a chthonic lair where the rightful king Aeson had been imprisoned by his evil half-brother Pelias. In some accounts, Alcimede was called the daughter of Autolycus; the same was said of Polymele, another possible mother of Jason.

== Mythology ==
The old story of Alcimede's son Jason and the quest for the Golden Fleece is most familiar from a late version, the Argonautica of Apollonius of Rhodes.

A hint of matrilineal descent in archaic times among the Boeotian Minyans of Greece is in Apollonius' aside concerning Jason's heritage:

"So many then were the helpers who assembled to join the son of Aeson. All the chiefs the dwellers thereabout called Minyae, for the most and the bravest avowed that they were sprung from the blood of the daughters of Minyas; thus Jason himself was the son of Alcimede, who was born of Clymene, the daughter of Minyas."

A further hint of archaic matrilineal descent is that Clymene's consort is offered in two versions: she was usually cast as the wife of Phylacus (son of Deioneus, son of Aeolus) or in some versions, Aeson was fathered by Cephalus, otherwise the consort of Procris.

Along with Aeson, Alcimede was forced by the usurping Pelias to commit suicide. She hanged herself or else drank, along with her husband and the child Promachus, of bull's blood and so died.
