= Jason =

Greek mythological hero and leader of the Argonauts

- Prince of Iolcus
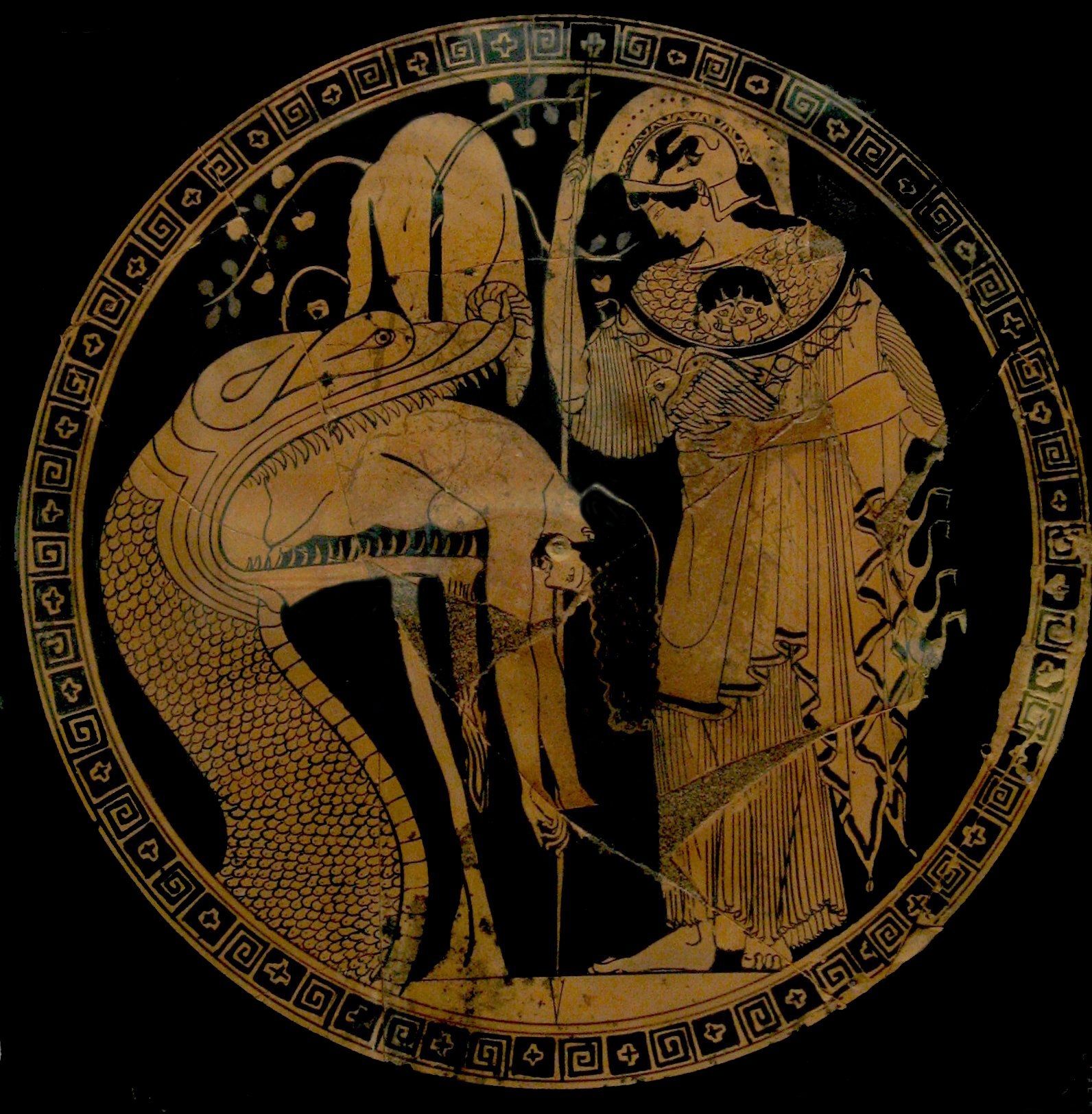
- Jason, between the jaws of the dragon which guards the Golden Fleece, is saved by Athena. The fleece hangs from a tree behind them. Attic kylix, c. 480–470 BC, attributed to Douris.
- Region: Iolcus

Genealogy
- Parents: Aeson (father); Alcimede (mother)
- Consort: Medea
- Offspring: Medus, Mermerus and Pheres, Thessalus

Jason (/ˈdʒeɪ.sən/ JAY-sən; Ancient Greek: Ἰάσων, romanized: Iásōn [i.ǎːsɔːn]) was an ancient Greek mythological hero and leader of the Argonauts, whose quest for the Golden Fleece is featured in Greek literature. He was the son of Aeson, the rightful king of Iolcos. He was married to the sorceress Medea, the granddaughter of the sungod Helios.

Jason appeared in various literary works in the classical world of Greece and Rome, including the epic poem Argonautica and the tragedy Medea. Modern adaptations of the myth of Jason include the 1963 film Jason and the Argonauts and the 2000 TV miniseries of the same name.

== Persecution by Pelias ==
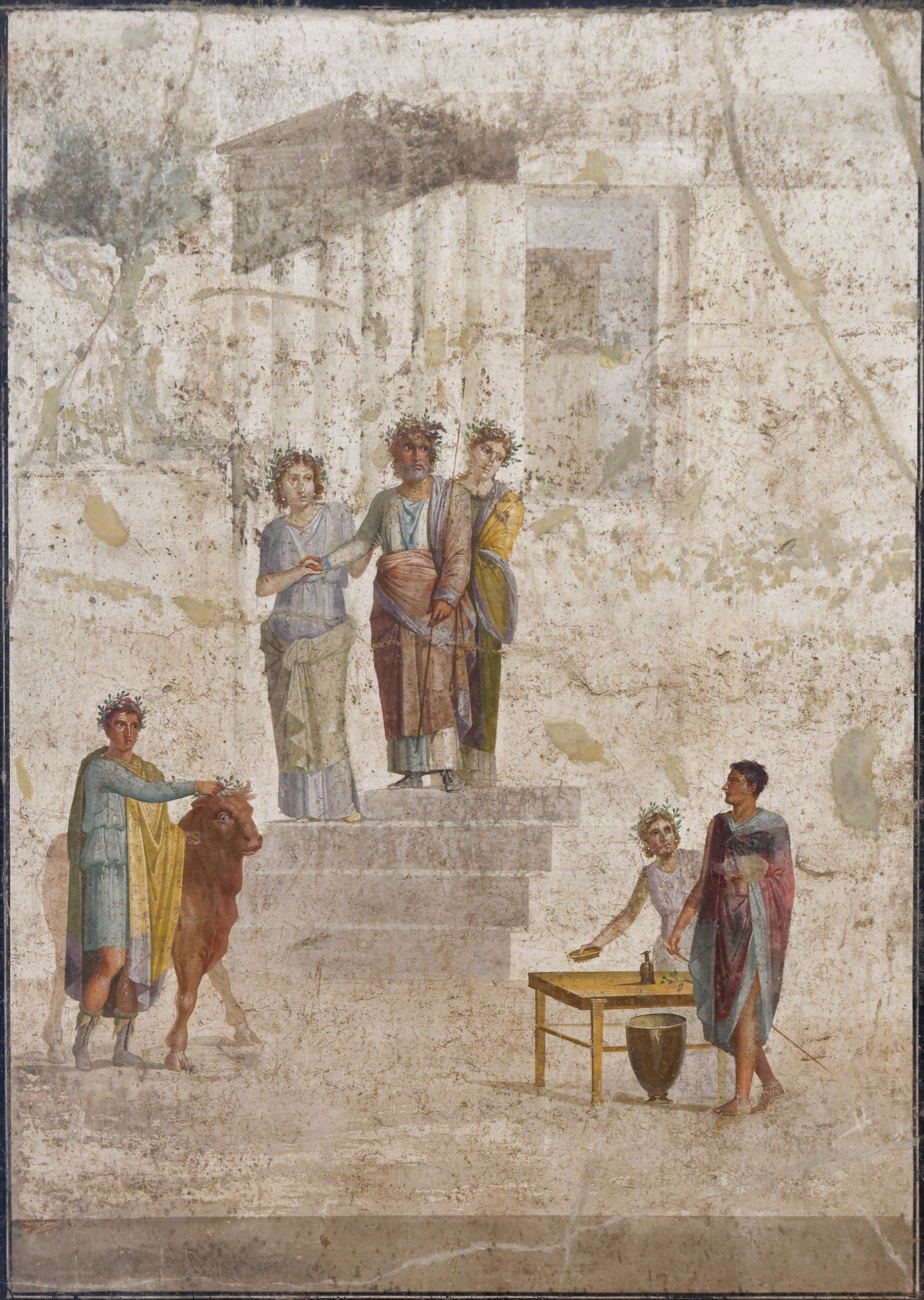
Pelias, king of Iolcos, stops on the steps of a temple as he recognises young Jason by his missing sandal; Roman fresco from Pompeii, 20–25 AD.

Pelias (Aeson's half-brother) was power-hungry and sought to gain dominion over all of Thessaly. Pelias was the progeny of a union between their shared mother, Tyro ("high born Tyro"), the daughter of Salmoneus, and the sea god Poseidon. In a bitter feud, he overthrew Aeson (the rightful king), killing all the descendants of Aeson that he could. He spared his half-brother for unknown reasons.

Aeson's wife Alcimede I had a newborn son named Jason, whom she saved from Pelias by having female attendants cluster around the infant and cry as if he were stillborn. Fearing that Pelias would eventually notice and kill her son, Alcimede sent him away to be reared by the centaur Chiron. She claimed that she had been having an affair with him all along. Pelias, fearing that his ill-gotten kingship might be challenged, consulted an oracle, who warned him to beware of a man wearing only one sandal.

Many years later, Pelias was holding games in honor of Poseidon when the grown Jason arrived in Iolcus, having lost one of his sandals in the river Anauros ("wintry Anauros") while helping an old woman (actually the goddess Hera in disguise) to cross. She blessed him, for she knew what Pelias had planned. When Jason entered Iolcus (the present-day city of Volos), he was announced as a man wearing only one sandal. Jason, aware that he was the rightful king, so informed Pelias. Pelias replied, "To take my throne, which you shall, you must go on a quest to find the Golden Fleece." Jason readily accepted this condition.

== The Argonauts and the Quest for the Golden Fleece ==
Jason assembled for his crew, a number of heroes, known as the Argonauts after their ship, the Argo. The group of heroes included:

- Acastus;
- Admetus;
- Argus, the eponymous builder of the Argo;
- Atalanta;
- Augeas;
- the winged Boreads, Zetes & Calaïs;
- the Dioscuri, Castor & Polydeuces;
- Euphemus;
- Heracles;
- Idas;
- Idmon, the seer;
- Lynceus;
- Meleager;
- Orpheus;
- Peleus;
- Philoctetes;
- Telamon; and
- Tiphys, the helmsman

=== The Isle of Lemnos ===
The isle of Lemnos is situated in the north Aegean Sea, near the Western coast of Asia Minor (modern day Turkey).

The island was inhabited by a race of women who had killed their husbands. The women had neglected their worship of Aphrodite, and as a punishment the goddess made the women so foul in stench that their husbands could not bear to be near them. The men then took concubines from the Thracian mainland opposite, and the spurned women, angry at Aphrodite, killed all the male inhabitants while they slept. The king, Thoas, was saved by Hypsipyle, his daughter, who put him out to sea sealed in a chest from which he was later rescued. The women of Lemnos lived for a while without men, with Hypsipyle as their queen.

During the visit of the Argonauts the women mingled with the men creating a new "race" called Minyae. Jason fathered twins with the queen. Heracles pressured them to leave as he was disgusted by the antics of the Argonauts. He had not taken part, which is truly unusual considering the numerous affairs he had with other women.

=== Cyzicus ===
After Lemnos the Argonauts landed among the Doliones, whose king Cyzicus treated them graciously. He told them about the land beyond Bear Mountain, but forgot to mention what lived there. What lived in the land beyond Bear Mountain were the Gegeines, which are a tribe of Earthborn giants with six arms who wore leather loincloths.

While most of the crew went into the forest to search for supplies, the Gegeines saw that few Argonauts were guarding the ship and raided it. Heracles was among those guarding the ship at the time and managed to kill most of them before Jason and the others returned. Once some of the other Gegeines were killed, Jason and the Argonauts set sail.

The Argonauts departed, losing their bearings and landing again at the same spot that night. In the darkness, the Doliones took them for enemies and they started fighting each other. The Argonauts killed many of the Doliones, among them the king Cyzicus. Cyzicus' wife killed herself. The Argonauts realized their horrible mistake when dawn came and held a funeral for him.

=== Phineus and the harpies ===
Soon, Jason reached the court of Phineus of Salmydessus in Thrace. Zeus had sent the harpies to steal the food put out for Phineus each day. Jason took pity on the emaciated king and killed the Harpies when they returned; in other versions, Calais and Zetes chase the harpies away. In return for this favor, Phineus revealed to Jason the location of Colchis and how to pass the Symplegades, or The Clashing Rocks, and then they parted.

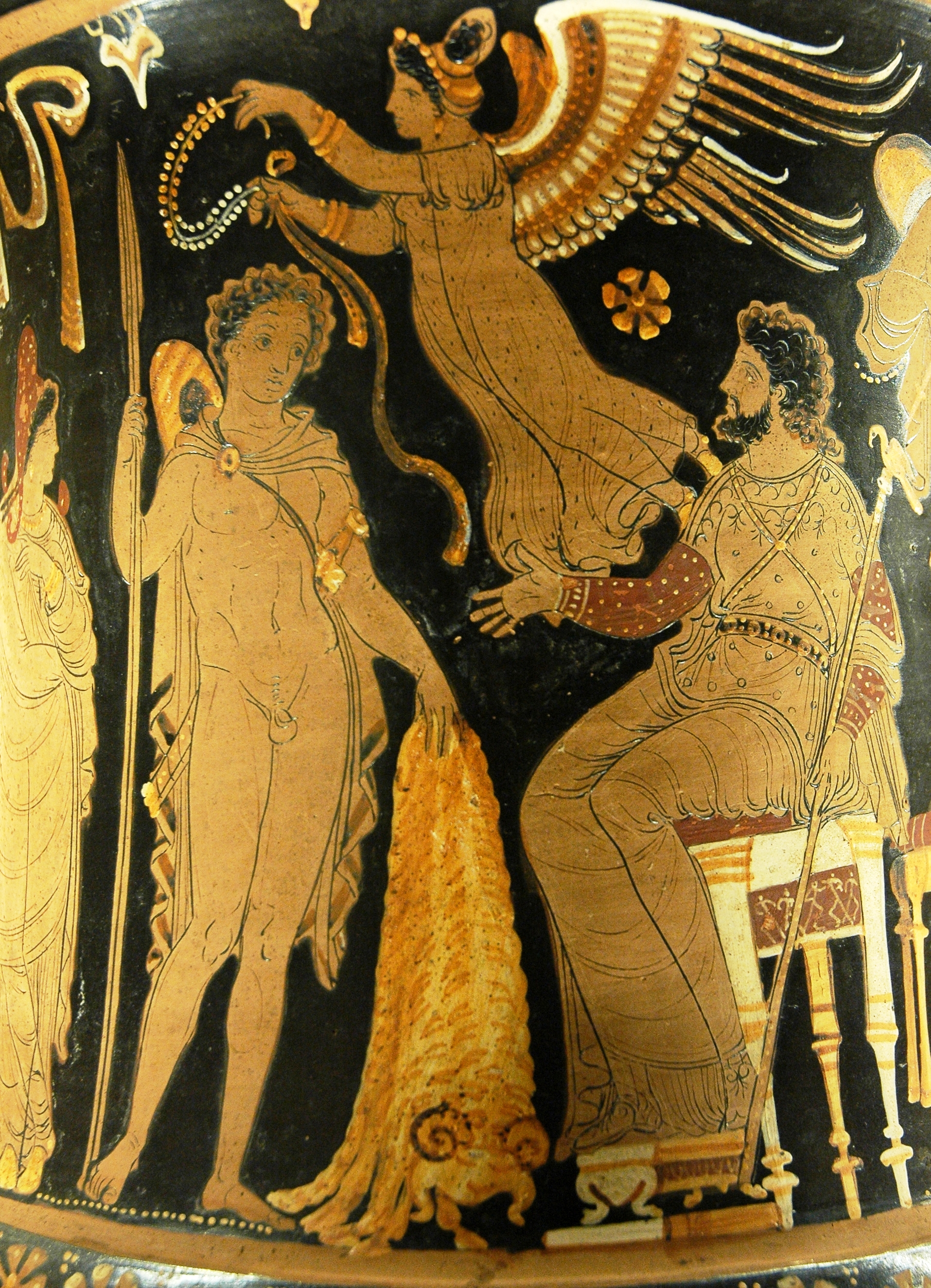
Jason bringing Pelias the Golden Fleece, Apulian red-figure calyx krater, c. 340 BC–330 BC, Louvre

=== The Symplegades ===
The only way to reach Colchis was to sail through the Symplegades (Clashing Rocks), huge rock cliffs that came together and crushed anything that traveled between them. Phineus told Jason to release a dove when they approached these islands, and if the dove made it through, to row with all their might. If the dove was crushed, he was doomed to fail. Jason released the dove as advised, which made it through, losing only a few tail feathers. Seeing this, they rowed strongly and made it through with minor damage at the extreme stern of the ship. From that time on, the clashing rocks were forever joined leaving free passage for others to pass.

=== The arrival in Colchis ===
Jason arrived in Colchis (modern Black Sea coast of Georgia) to claim the fleece as his own. It was owned by King Aeetes of Colchis. The fleece was given to him by Phrixus. Aeetes promised to give it to Jason only if he could perform three certain tasks. Presented with the tasks, Jason became discouraged and fell into depression. However, Hera had persuaded Aphrodite to convince her son Eros to make Aeetes' daughter, Medea, fall in love with Jason. As a result, Medea aided Jason in his tasks.

First, Jason had to plow a field with fire-breathing oxen, the Khalkotauroi, that he had to yoke himself. Medea provided an ointment that protected him from the oxen's flames. Then, Jason sowed the teeth of a dragon into a field. The teeth sprouted into an army of warriors (spartoi). Medea had previously warned Jason of this and told him how to defeat this foe.

Before they attacked him, he threw a rock into the crowd. Unable to discover where the rock had come from, the soldiers attacked and defeated one another. His last task was to overcome the sleepless dragon which guarded the Golden Fleece. Jason sprayed the dragon with a potion, given by Medea, distilled from herbs. The dragon fell asleep, and Jason was able to seize the Golden Fleece.

He then sailed away with Medea. Medea distracted her father, who chased them as they fled, by killing her brother Apsyrtus and throwing pieces of his body into the sea; Aeetes stopped to gather them. In another version, Medea lured Apsyrtus into a trap. Jason killed him, chopped off his fingers and toes, and buried the corpse. In any case, Jason and Medea escaped.

== The return journey ==
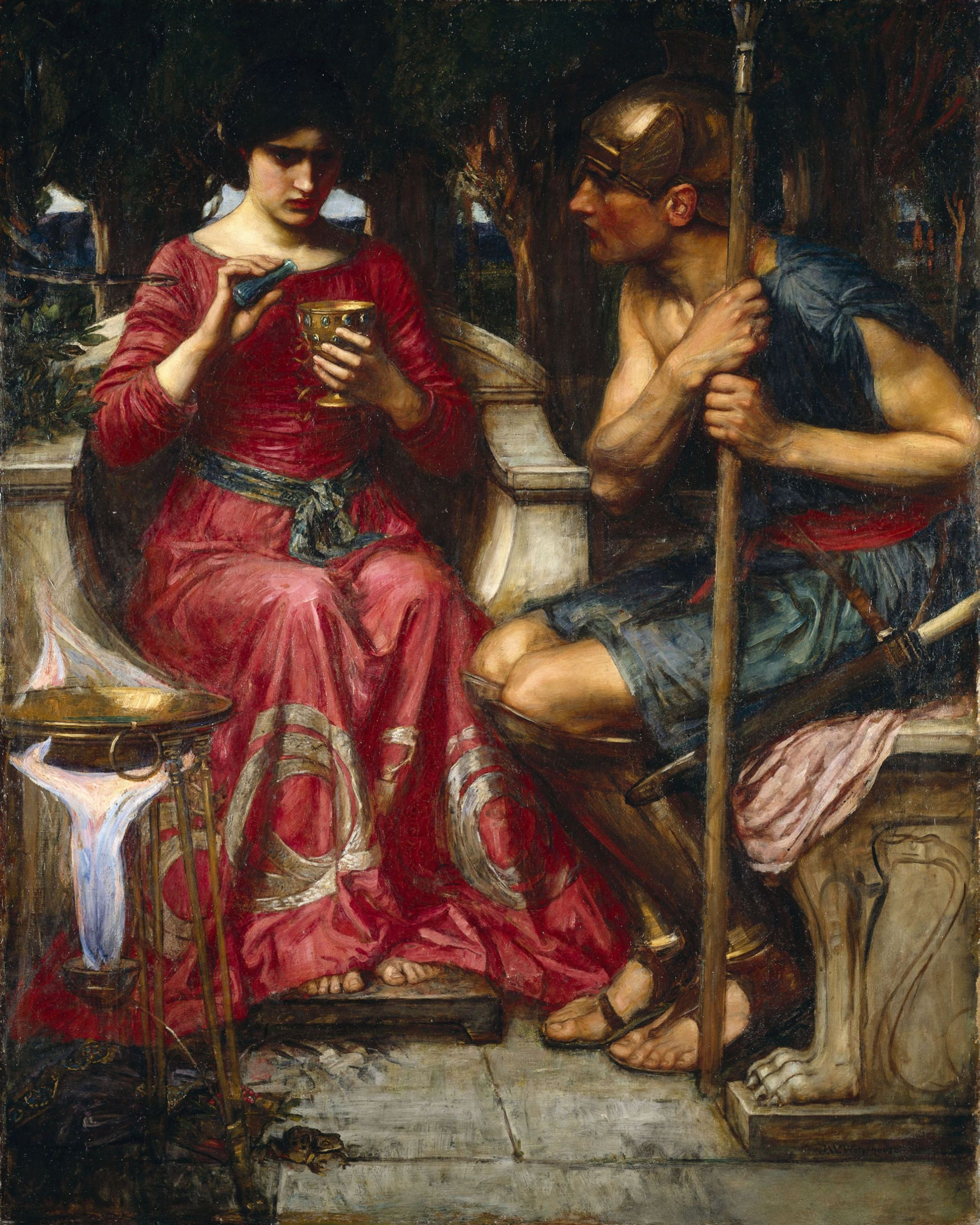
Jason and Medea - as depicted by John William Waterhouse, 1907.

On the way back to Iolcus, Medea prophesied to Euphemus, the Argo's helmsman, that one day he would rule Cyrene. This came true through Battus, a descendant of Euphemus. Zeus, as punishment for the slaughter of Medea's own brother, sent a series of storms at the Argo and blew it off course. The Argo then spoke and said that they should seek purification with Circe, a nymph living on the island of Aeaea. After being cleansed, they continued their journey home.

=== Sirens ===
Chiron had told Jason that without the aid of Orpheus, the Argonauts would never be able to pass the Sirens—the same Sirens encountered by Odysseus in Homer's epic poem the Odyssey. The Sirens lived on three small, rocky islands called Sirenum scopuli and sang beautiful songs that enticed sailors to come to them, which would result in the wrecking of their ship on the islands. When Orpheus heard their voices, he drew his lyre and played music that was more beautiful and louder, drowning out the Sirens' bewitching songs.

=== Talos ===
The Argo then came to the island of Crete, guarded by the bronze man, Talos. As the ship approached, Talos hurled huge stones at the ship, keeping it at bay. Talos had one ichor vessel which went from his neck to his ankle, bound shut by only one bronze nail (as in metal casting by the lost wax method). Medea cast a spell on Talos to calm him; she removed the bronze nail and Talos bled to death. The Argo was then able to sail on.

=== Jason returns ===
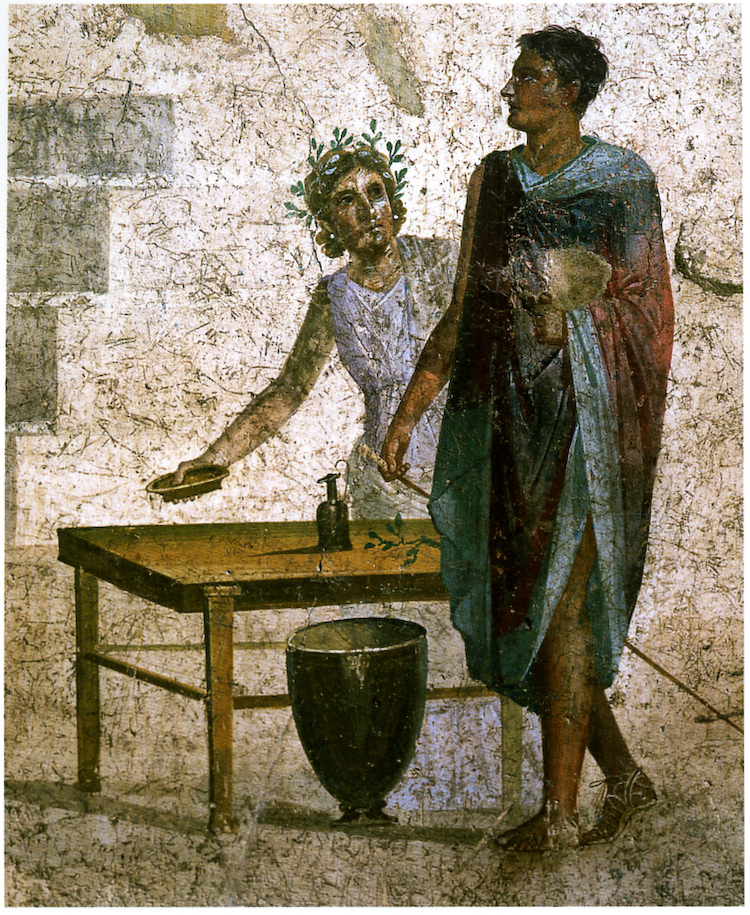
Jason on a fresco from Pompeii

Thomas Bulfinch has an antecedent to the interaction of Medea and the daughters of Pelias. Jason, celebrating his return with the Golden Fleece, noted that his father was too aged and infirm to participate in the celebrations. He had seen and been served by Medea's magical powers. He asked Medea to take some years from his life and add them to the life of his father. She did so, but at no such cost to Jason's life. Medea withdrew the blood from Aeson's body and infused it with certain herbs; putting it back into his veins, returning vigor to him. Pelias' daughters saw this and wanted the same service for their father.

Medea, using her sorcery, claimed to Pelias' daughters that she could make their father smooth and vigorous as a child by chopping him up into pieces and boiling the pieces in a cauldron of water and magical herbs. She demonstrated this remarkable feat with the oldest ram in the flock, which leapt out of the cauldron as a lamb. The girls, rather naively, sliced and diced their father and put him in the cauldron. Medea did not add the magical herbs, and Pelias was dead. Pelias' son, Acastus, drove Jason and Medea into exile for the murder, and the couple settled in Corinth.

=== Treachery of Jason ===
In Corinth, Jason became engaged to marry Creusa (sometimes referred to as Glauce), a daughter of the King of Corinth, to strengthen his political ties. When Medea confronted Jason about the engagement and cited all the help she had given him, he retorted that it was not she that he should thank, but Aphrodite who made Medea fall in love with him. Infuriated with Jason for breaking his vow that he would be hers forever, Medea took her revenge by presenting to Creusa a cursed dress, as a wedding gift, that stuck to her body and burned her to death as soon as she put it on.

Creusa's father, Creon, burned to death with his daughter as he tried to save her. Then Medea killed the two boys that she bore to Jason, fearing that they would be murdered or enslaved as a result of their mother's actions. When Jason learned of this, Medea was already gone. She fled to Athens in a chariot of dragons sent by her grandfather, the sun-god Helios.

Although Jason calls Medea most hateful to gods and men, the fact that the chariot is given to her by Helios indicates that she still has the gods on her side. As Bernard Knox points out, Medea's last scene with concluding appearances parallels that of a number of indisputably divine beings in other plays by Euripides. Just like these gods, Medea "interrupts and puts a stop to the violent action of the human being on the lower level, ... justifies her savage revenge on the grounds that she has been treated with disrespect and mockery, ... takes measures and gives orders for the burial of the dead, prophesies the future", and "announces the foundation of a cult".

Later Jason and Peleus, father of the hero Achilles, attacked and defeated Acastus, reclaiming the throne of Iolcus for himself once more. Jason's son, Thessalus, then became king.

As a result of breaking his vow to love Medea forever, Jason lost his favor with Hera and died lonely and unhappy. He was asleep under the stem of the rotting Argo when it fell on him, killing him instantly.

== Family ==
=== Parentage ===
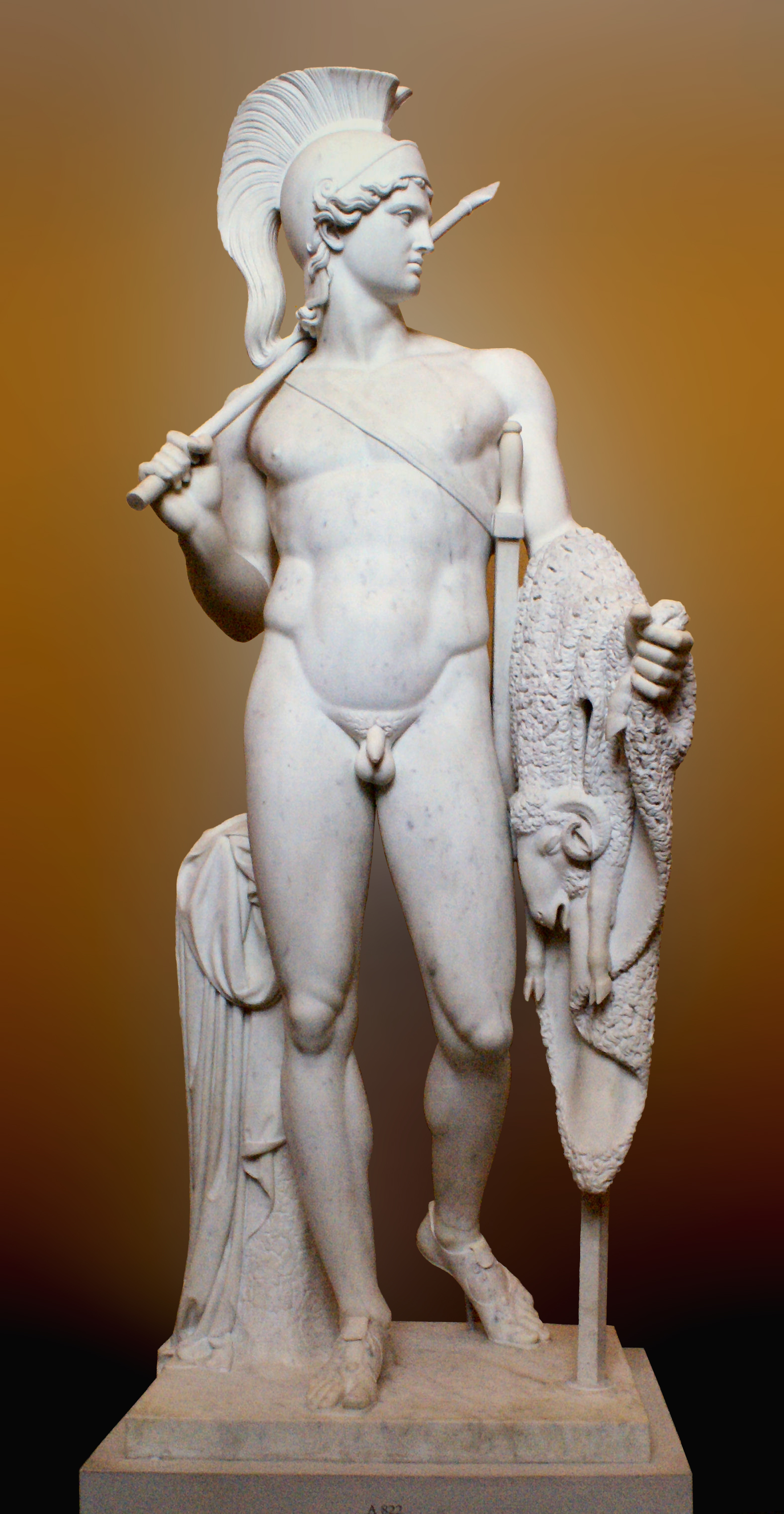
Jason with the Golden Fleece by Bertel Thorvaldsen

Jason's father is invariably Aeson, but there is great variation as to his mother's name. According to various authors, she could be:

- Alcimede, daughter of Phylacus and Clymene
- Polymede, or Polymele, or Polypheme, a daughter of Autolycus
- Amphinome
- Theognete, daughter of Laodicus
- Rhoeo
- Arne or Scarphe

Jason was also said to have had a younger brother, Promachus.

=== Children ===
Children by Medea:

- Alcimenes, murdered by Medea.
- Thessalus, twin of Alcimenes and king of Iolcus.
- Tisander, murdered by Medea
- Mermeros killed either by the Corinthians or by Medea
- Pheres, as above
- Eriopis, their only daughter
- Medus or Polyxenus, otherwise son of Aegeus
- Argus
- seven sons and seven daughters

Children by Hypsipyle:

- Euneus, King of Lemnos and his twin
- Nebrophonus or
- Deipylus or
- Thoas

Comparative table of Jason's family
Relation	Name	Source													
Relation	Name	(Sch. on) Homer	(Sch. on) Euripides		(Sch. on) Apollonius	Diodorus	Valerius	Apollodorus		Ptolemy	Pausanias	Hyginus		Tzetzes	Smith
Parentage	Aeson and Polymele or	✓												✓	
Parentage	Aeson and Polypheme or				✓										
Parentage	Aeson and Polymede							✓						✓	
Parentage	Aeson and Alcimede				✓		✓					✓			
Parentage	Aeson and Theognete				✓										
Parentage	Aeson and Amphinome					✓									
Parentage	Aeson and Rhoe													✓	
Parentage	Aeson and Arne													✓	
Parentage	Aeson and Scarphe													✓	
Sibling	Promachus					✓		✓							
Consort	Medea		✓			✓		✓		✓	✓	✓			✓
Consort	Hypsipyle			✓					✓				✓		
Children	Mermeros		✓					✓				✓			
Children	Pheres		✓					✓				✓			
Children	Alcimenes					✓									
Children	Thessalus					✓									
Children	Tisandrus					✓									
Children	7 sons & 7 daughters									✓					
Children	Eriopis										✓				
Children	Medus or Polyxemus										✓				
Children	Argus														✓
Children	Euneus			✓					✓				✓		
Children	Nebrophonus								✓						
Children	Deipylus												✓		
Children	Thoas			✓											

== In literature ==
Finding is the first act
The second, loss,
Third, Expedition for
The “Golden Fleece”

Fourth, no discovery—
Fifth, no crew—
Finally, no Gold Fleece—
Jason—sham—too.
—Poet Emily Dickinson

Though some of the episodes of Jason's story draw on ancient material, the definitive telling, on which this account relies, is that of Apollonius of Rhodes in his epic poem Argonautica, written in Alexandria in the late 3rd century BC.

Another Argonautica was written by Gaius Valerius Flaccus in the late 1st century AD, eight books in length. The poem ends abruptly with the request of Medea to accompany Jason on his homeward voyage. It is unclear if part of the epic poem has been lost, or if it was never finished. A third version is the Argonautica Orphica, which emphasizes the role of Orpheus in the story.

Jason is briefly mentioned in Dante's Divine Comedy in the poem Inferno. He appears in the Canto XVIII. In it, he is seen by Dante and his guide Virgil being punished in Hell's Eighth Circle (Bolgia 1) by being driven to march through the circle for all eternity while being whipped by devils. He is included among the panderers and seducers (possibly for his seduction and subsequent abandoning of Medea).

The story of Medea's revenge on Jason is told with devastating effect by Euripides in his tragedy Medea.

William Morris wrote an English epic poem, The Life and Death of Jason, published in 1867. Originally intended as part of the author's The Earthly Paradise, the work was published separately. It became Morris's most popular poem during his lifetime, but was later neglected by most critics, who dismissed it as escapist. J. R. R. Tolkien scholar, Allan Turner, has suggested that Tolkien may have learnt his method of embedding multiple types of verse into a text from this poem.

In the 1898 short novel The Story of Perseus and the Gorgon's Head the mythical story of Jason is described.

Padraic Colum wrote an adaptation for children, The Golden Fleece and the Heroes Who Lived Before Achilles, illustrated by Willy Pogany and published in 1921.

The mythical geography of the voyage of the Argonauts has been connected to specific geographic locations by Livio Stecchini but his theories have not been widely adopted.

== See also ==
- Cape Jason
- Mermeros and Pheres
- Jason in popular culture

== Sources ==
- Charyn, Jerome. 2016. A Loaded Gun: Emily Dickinson for the 21st Century. Bellevue Literary Press, New York. ISBN 978-1934137987
- Franklin, R. W. 1998. The Poems of Emily Dickinson, Variorum Edition. Belknap Press. ISBN 978-0674018242

=== Bibliography ===
- Alain Moreau, Le Mythe de Jason et Médée. Le Va-nu-pied et la Sorcière. Paris: Les Belles Lettres, collection «Vérité des mythes», 2006 (ISBN 2-251-32440-2).
- Apollodorus, The Library with an English Translation by Sir James George Frazer, F.B.A., F.R.S. in 2 Volumes, Cambridge, MA, Harvard University Press; London, William Heinemann Ltd. 1921. ISBN 0-674-99135-4. Online version at the Perseus Digital Library. Greek text available from the same website.
- Apollonius Rhodius, Argonautica translated by Robert Cooper Seaton (1853–1915), R. C. Loeb Classical Library Volume 001. London, William Heinemann Ltd, 1912. Online version at the Topos Text Project.
- Apollonius Rhodius, Argonautica. George W. Mooney. London. Longmans, Green. 1912. Greek text available at the Perseus Digital Library.
- Bulfinch's Mythology, Medea and Aeson.
- Diodorus Siculus, The Library of History translated by Charles Henry Oldfather. Twelve volumes. Loeb Classical Library. Cambridge, Massachusetts: Harvard University Press; London: William Heinemann, Ltd. 1989. Vol. 3. Books 4.59–8. Online version at Bill Thayer's Web Site
- Diodorus Siculus, Bibliotheca Historica. Vol 1-2. Immanel Bekker. Ludwig Dindorf. Friedrich Vogel. in aedibus B. G. Teubneri. Leipzig. 1888–1890. Greek text available at the Perseus Digital Library.
- Gaius Julius Hyginus, Fabulae from The Myths of Hyginus translated and edited by Mary Grant. University of Kansas Publications in Humanistic Studies. Online version at the Topos Text Project.
- Gaius Valerius Flaccus, Argonautica translated by Mozley, J H. Loeb Classical Library Volume 286. Cambridge, MA, Harvard University Press; London, William Heinemann Ltd. 1928. Online version at theio.com.
- Gaius Valerius Flaccus, Argonauticon. Otto Kramer. Leipzig. Teubner. 1913. Latin text available at the Perseus Digital Library.
- Hesiod, Catalogue of Women from Homeric Hymns, Epic Cycle, Homerica translated by Evelyn-White, H G. Loeb Classical Library Volume 57. London: William Heinemann, 1914. Online version at theio.com
- King, David. Finding Atlantis: A True Story of Genius, Madness, and an Extraordinary Quest for a Lost World. Harmony Books, New York, 1970. (Based on works of Olof Rudbeck 1630–1702.)
- Powell, B. The Voyage of the Argo. In Classical Myth. Upper Saddle River, NJ. Prentice Hall. 2001. pp. 477–489.
- Publius Ovidius Naso, The Epistles of Ovid. London. J. Nunn, Great-Queen-Street; R. Priestly, 143, High-Holborn; R. Lea, Greek-Street, Soho; and J. Rodwell, New-Bond-Street. 1813. Online version at the Perseus Digital Library.
- Publius Ovidius Naso, Metamorphoses translated by Brookes More (1859–1942). Boston, Cornhill Publishing Co. 1922. Online version at the Perseus Digital Library.
- Publius Ovidius Naso, Metamorphoses. Hugo Magnus. Gotha (Germany). Friedr. Andr. Perthes. 1892. Latin text available at the Perseus Digital Library.
