= Autolycus =

Son of the god Hermes and Chione

In Greek mythology, Autolycus (/ɔːˈtɒlɪkəs/; Ancient Greek: Αὐτόλυκος, romanized: Autólykos, lit. 'the wolf itself') was a robber who had the power to metamorphose or make invisible the things he stole. He had his residence on Mount Parnassus and was renowned among men for his cunning and oaths.

== Family ==
There are a number of different accounts of the birth of Autolycus. According to most, he was the son of Hermes and Chione or Philonis. In Ovid's version, Autolycus was conceived after Hermes had intercourse with the virgin Chione. Pausanias instead states that Autolycus's real father was Daedalion. In some accounts, his mother was also called Telauge.

Depending on the source, Autolycus was the husband of Mestra (who could change her shape at will and was a daughter of Erysichthon), or of Neaera, or of Amphithea. He became the father of Anticlea (who married Laertes of Ithaca and was the mother of Odysseus) and several sons, of whom only Aesimus, father of Sinon was named. Autolycus's other daughter(s) Alcimede and/or Polymede (also called Polymele and Polypheme) were both called the mother of Jason, the famous Argonaut who led a group of men to find the coveted Golden Fleece. Likewise Autolycus was said to have joined the legendary journey.

Comparative table of Autolycus's family
Relation	Names	Sources							
Relation	Names	Homer	Hesiod	Apollodorus	Ovid	Hyginus	Pausanias	Tryphiodorus	Eustathius
Parentage	Hermes			✓			✓		
Parentage	Hermes and Philonis		✓			✓			
Parentage	Hermes and Chione				✓	✓			
Parentage	Daedalion			✓			✓		
Parentage	Hermes and Telauge or								✓
Parentage	Daedalion and Telauge								✓
Spouse	Amphithea	✓						✓	
Spouse	Mestra				✓				
Spouse	Neaera						✓		
Offspring	Anticlea	✓				✓			
Offspring	Polymede			✓					
Offspring	Neaera					✓			
Offspring	Aesimus							✓	

== Mythology ==
=== Adventures ===
According to Bibliotheca, Autolycus was counted as one of the Argonauts.

Autolycus obtained most of the same skills that his supposed father Hermes possesses, such as the arts of theft and trickery. It was said that he "loved to make white of black, and black of white, from a hornless animal to a horned one, or from horned one to a hornless". He was given the gift that his thievery could not be caught by anyone.

Autolycus, master of thievery, was also well known for stealing Sisyphus's herd right from underneath him – Sisyphus, who was commonly known for being a crafty king that killed guests, seduced his niece and stole his brothers' throne and was banished to the throes of Tartarus by the gods. However, according to other versions of the myth, Autolycus failed to steal Sisyphus's herd and the king banished him from his city.

Heracles, the great Greek hero, was taught the art of wrestling by Autolycus. However, Autolycus was a source of trouble in Heracles's life, because when Autolycus stole some cattle from Euboea and Eurytus, they accused Heracles of the deed; upon going mad from these accusations, Heracles killed them and another one of Eurytus's sons, Iphitus. This led to Heracles serving three years of punishment to repent the deed.

=== Odysseus's name ===
Through Anticleia, Autolycus was also the grandfather of the famous warrior Odysseus, and he was responsible for the naming of the child as well. This happened when the nurse of the child Eurycleia "laid the child upon his knees and spoke, and addressed him: Autolycus, find now thyself a name to give to thy child's own child; be sure he has long been prayed for". Then Autolycus answered: "Since I have been angered (ὀδυσσάμενος odyssamenos) with many, both men and women, let the name of the child be Odysseus".
