= Rhoeo =

Mythical mother of Anius by Apollo

In Greek mythology, Rhoeo (/ˈriːoʊ/; Ancient Greek: Ῥοιώ, romanized: Rhoiṓ) was a lover of Apollo and mother of Anius, king of Delos and priest of Apollo.

== Family ==
Rhoeo was the daughter of Staphylus, son of Dionysus and Ariadne, and Chrysothemis, daughter of Carmanor. Her sisters were Parthenos and Molpadia (later named Hemithea).

In one account, Rhoeo was named as one of the possible mothers of the hero Jason by Aeson.

== Mythology ==
Parthenius relates that she once experienced a great jealousy of her sister Hemithea when Staphylus arranged for the latter to spend a night with Lyrcus, his guest, whom both Hemithea and Rhoeo fell in love with.

She became the lover of Apollo and by him the mother of Anius. When her father discovered her pregnancy, he believed she was impregnated by a man rather than a god. He placed her in a chest and cast her out to sea (parallel to Danae and Perseus). She landed on the island of Delos, which was sacred to Apollo. She gave birth to a son on the island and named him Anius (as if from ἀνιάομαι "to suffer"); she then put him on the altar of Apollo and prayed to the god that the baby be saved if it was his. Apollo concealed the child for a while, then raised him and taught him the art of divination and granted him certain honors.

Rhoeo eventually married Zarex, son of Carystus or Carycus, who accepted Anius as his son. She had two more children with him. Later, becoming a priest of Apollo and the king of Delos, Anius gave aid to Aeneas and his retinue when they were travelling from Troy to the future site of Rome.

== See also ==
- Naming citation for Jovian asteroid 5258 Rhoeo
