= Laodicus =

Character in Greek mythology

In Greek mythology, Laodicus (Ancient Greek: Λαόδικος, lit. 'tried by the people') may refer to the following figures:

- Laodicus, father of Theognete, one of the possible mothers of Jason by Aeson.
- Laodicus, father of Europe who was one of the sacrificial victims of Minotaur.
- Laodicus, one of the Suitors of Penelope who came from Zacynthus along with other 43 wooers. He, with the other suitors, was shot dead by Odysseus with the assistance of Eumaeus, Philoetius, and Telemachus.
