= Staphylus (son of Dionysus) =

Son of Dionysus in Greek mythology

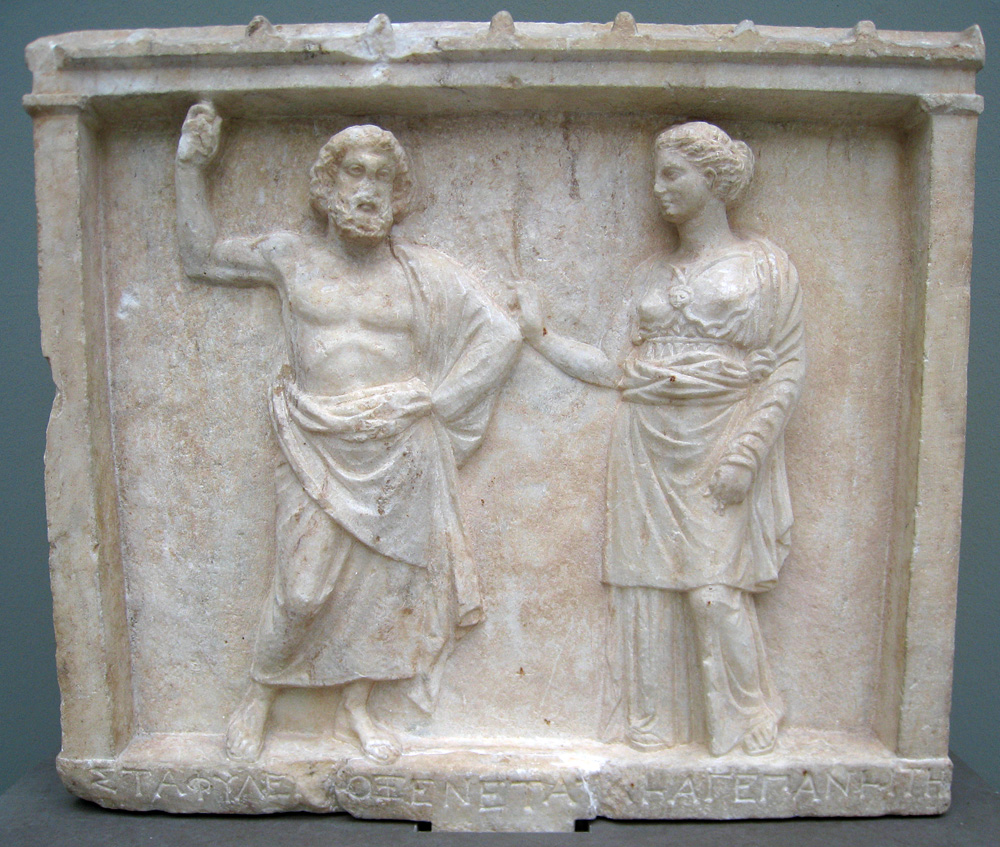
Marble relief of the 4th century BC depicting Staphylus (left) with Athena (right)

In Greek mythology, Staphylus (/ˈstæfɪləs/; Ancient Greek: Στάφυλος, romanized: Stáphulos) was the son of wine-god Dionysus and Ariadne. His brothers include Oenopion, Thoas, Latramys, Euanthes, Tauropolus, Peparethus, and Phanus. Another source stated that Staphylus's brothers were Maron, Thoas, and Eunous.

== Mythology ==
Staphylus and his brother Phanus are counted among the Argonauts.

As one of Rhadamanthys' generals, he was the founder of the colony of Peparethos on the island of Skopelos, in the Northern Sporades island chain. Staphylus dwelt in Naxos and was married to Chrysothemis, by whom he had three daughters: Rhoeo, who was a lover to Apollo, Parthenos, and Molpadia or Hemithea. The latter became the mother of Basileus with Lyrcus after Lyrcus had made a journey to the oracle at Didyma. Staphylus is said to have enticed Lyrcus into too much drinking of wine and then, when Lyrcus' senses were dulled by drunkenness, united him with Hemithea.

In the 12th-century AD lexicon Etymologicum Magnum, Staphylus is credited as the founder of viticulture.
