= Iolcus =

Iolcus Iωλκός
- Municipal unit
- Location within the regional unit

- Location within Greece
- Coordinates: 39°23′N 22°59′E
- Country: Greece
- Administrative region: Thessaly
- Regional unit: Magnesia
- Municipality: Volos

Area
  - Municipal unit: 1.981 km^{2} (0.765 sq mi)
- Elevation: 156 m (512 ft)

Population (2021)
  - Municipal unit: 2,008
  - Municipal unit density: 1,014/km^{2} (2,625/sq mi)
- Time zone: UTC+2 (EET)
  - Summer (DST): UTC+3 (EEST)
- Postal code: 385 00
- Area code: 24210
- Vehicle registration: ΒΟ
- Website: www.iolkos.gr

Iolcus (/aɪˈɒlkəs/; also rendered Iolkos /aɪˈɒlkɒs/; Ancient Greek: Ἰωλκός and Ἰαωλκός; Doric Greek: Ἰαλκός; Greek: Ιωλκός) is an ancient city, a modern village and a former municipality in Magnesia, Thessaly, Greece. Since the 2011 local government reform it is part of Volos, of which it is a municipal unit. It is located in central Magnesia, north of the Pagasitic Gulf. Its land area is 1.981 km^{2}. The municipal unit is divided into three communities, Agios Onoufrios (pop. 433), Anakasia (pop. 888) and Ano Volos (pop. 687), with a total population of 2,008 (2021 census). The seat of the former municipality was the village of Ano Volos.

== Mythology ==
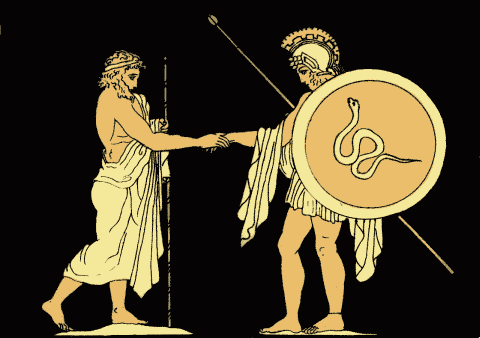
Pelias sends forth Jason, in an 1879 illustration from Stories from the Greek Tragedians by Alfred Church.

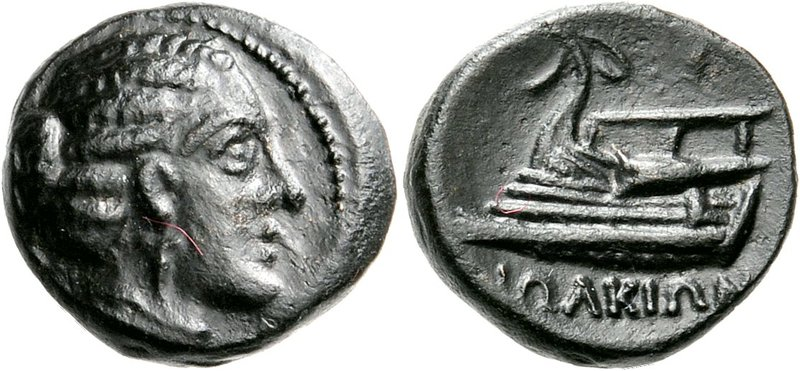
Coin (Chalkous) of Iolcus. 4th century BC. Obverse: Head of Artemis Iolkia. Reverse: Prow of Argo, ΙΩΛΚΙΩΝ (of Iolcians).

According to ancient Greek mythology, Aeson was the rightful king of Iolcus, but his half-brother Pelias usurped the throne. It was Pelias who sent Aeson's son Jason and his Argonauts to look for the Golden Fleece. The ship Argo set sail from Iolcus with a crew of fifty demigods and princes under Jason's leadership. Their mission was to reach Colchis in Aea at the eastern seaboard of the Black Sea and to reclaim and bring back the Golden Fleece.

Along with the Golden Fleece, Jason brought a wife, the sorceress Medea—king Aeetes's daughter, granddaughter of Helios, niece of Circe, princess of Aea, and later queen of Iolcus, Corinth and Aea, and also murderer of her brother Absyrtus, and her two sons from Jason. She is a tragic figure whose trials and tribulations were artfully dramatized in the much-staged play by Euripides, Medea.

== History ==
Iolcus is mentioned by Homer, in the Catalogue of Ships in the Iliad, and later in the Odyssey; he gives it the epithets of ἐϋκτιμένη ("well built") and εὐρύχορος ("with broad places", "spacious"). The Bibliotheca of Pseudo-Apollodorus says the city was founded by Cretheus, and to have been colonised by Minyans from Orchomenos.

In antiquity, Iolcus was situated in Magnesia, ancient Thessaly, and was a polis (city-state). It is rarely mentioned in historical times. It was given by the Thessalians to Hippias, upon his expulsion from Athens in 511/510 BCE, but he rejected it. It is also quoted in the Periplus of Pseudo-Scylax as a city belonging to Magnesia. The town afterward suffered from the disputes of its inhabitants, but it was finally ruined by Demetrius Poliorcetes's foundation of Demetrias in 294 BCE, when the inhabitants of Iolcus and of other adjoining towns were removed to that place. It seems to have been no longer in existence in the time of Strabo, since he speaks of the place where Iolcus stood. Strabo states that a festal assembly was held there in honor of Pelias.

== Site ==
The position of Iolcus is indicated by Strabo, who says that it was on the road from Boebe to Demetrias, and at the distance of 7 stadia from the latter. In another passage he says that Iolcus is situated above the sea at the distance of 7 stadia from Demetrias. Pindar places Iolcus is at the foot of Mount Pelion, consequently a little inland. It might indeed appear, from Livy, that Iolcus was situated upon the coast; but in this passage, as well as in Strabo, the name of Iolcus seems to have been given to this part of the coast and the city itself.

Ancient Iolcus's location is at the Volos Kastro, located at 39°21′59″N 22°58′08″E.

== Historical population ==
Historical population
Year	Pop.	±%
1991	2,415	—
2001	2,081	−13.8%
2011	2,138	+2.7%
2021	2,008	−6.1%

== See also ==
- List of ancient Greek cities
