= Phylacus =

In Greek mythology, Phylacus (/ˈfɪləkəs/; Ancient Greek: Φύλακος means "guardian") was the name of the following figures:

- Phylacus, founder of the city of Phylace, Thessaly. He was the son of Deioneus and Diomede, husband of Clymene (Periclymene), and the father of Iphiclus, Alcimede, Evadne and possibly Clymenus. In some accounts, Phylacus was also called the father of Alcimache who became the mother of Ajax the Lesser to Oileus. His children and grandchildren are sometimes referred to by the patronymic Phylacides. His grandson through Iphiclus was also named Phylacus. In some accounts, his grandsons Protesilaus and Podarces were called his sons by Astyoche.
- Phylacus, a Trojan who was killed by Leitus.
- Phylacus, a hero who had a sanctuary in Delphi. He was one of the four heroes whose ghosts terrified the Gaulish troops that attacked Delphi.
