= Chione (mythology) =

Various figures in Greek mythology

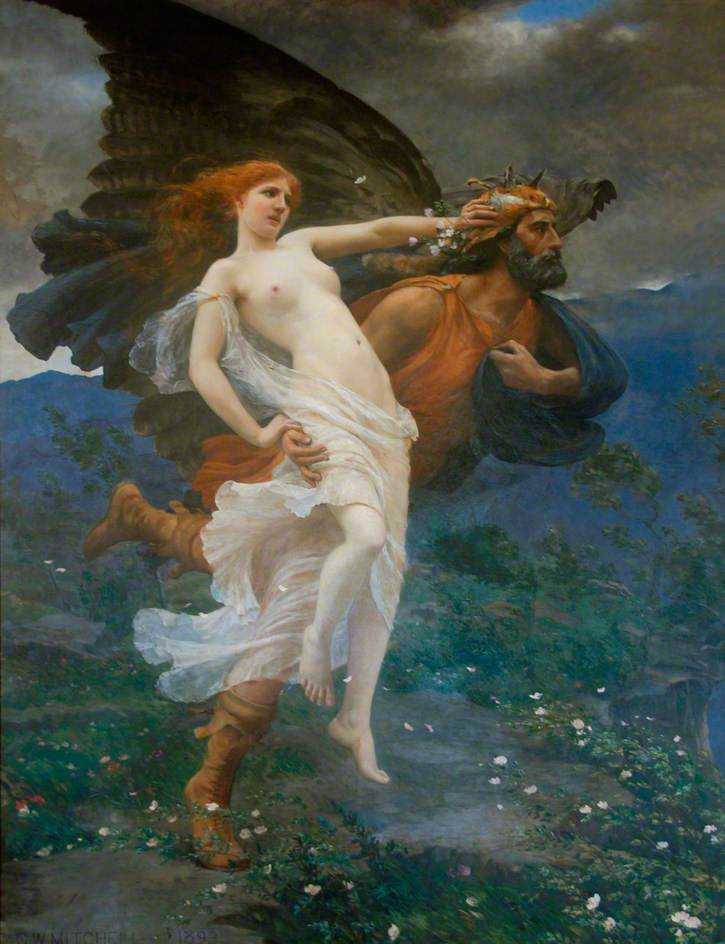
Charles William Mitchell- the flight of Boreas with Oreithyia

In Greek mythology, Chione (/kaɪˈoʊniː/; Ancient Greek: Χιόνη, romanized: Khiónē, lit. 'snowy', from χιών, khiṓn, 'snow') may refer to the following women:

- Chione, daughter of Boreas and mother of Eumolpus by Poseidon.
- Chione, daughter of Daedalion, and mother of Philammon and Autolycus by Apollo and Hermes respectively. She may be the same with Philonis and Leuconoe.
- Chione, daughter of Callirrhoe, who was changed into a snow cloud.
- Chione, daughter of Arcturus, who was abducted by Boreas and bore him three sons.
- Chione, the naiad mother of Priapus by Dionysus.
- Chione, one of the Niobids.
- Chione, a nymph who gave her name to the island of Chios in some versions. Might be identical with one of the other Chiones above.
