= Lucifer =

Latin word for Venus, associated with several mythological figures

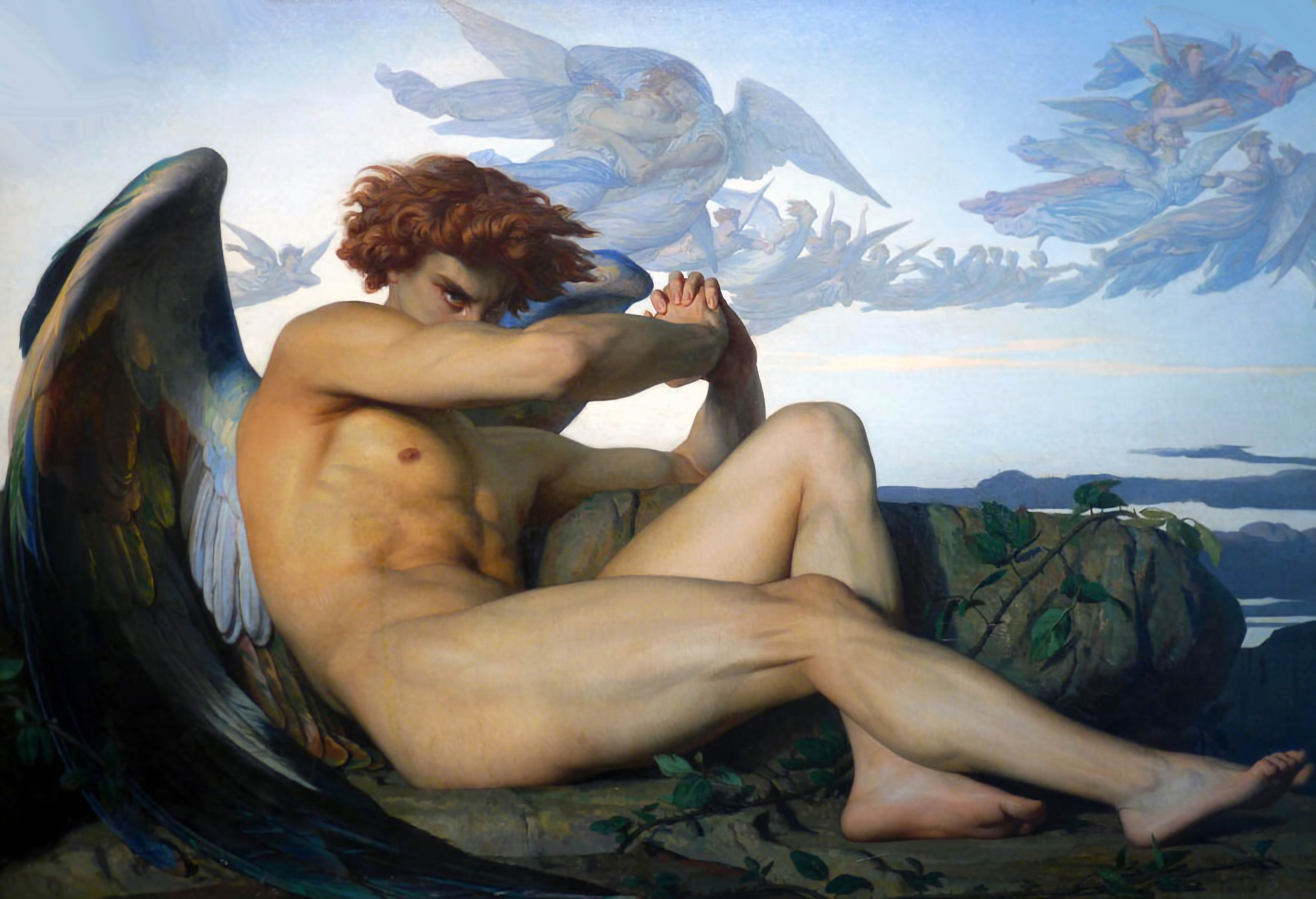
The Fallen Angel (1847) by Alexandre Cabanel

Lucifer was the Roman name for the morning star: i.e., the planet Venus. In Christian mythology, the name Lucifer has become an epithet for the Devil and the fallen angel mentioned in Revelation 12. Thus, the name is connected to the deadly sin of pride for the Devil's attempt to overthrow God, after which he was banished to Earth.

The concept of a heavenly entity named after Venus attempting to overthrow the highest deity parallels ʿAṯtar's attempt to replace Baal on his throne in Canaanite religion, a story which is alluded to in the Book of Isaiah and thus transferred to Christian beliefs. As Lucifer is the antagonist of God in Christian beliefs, some sects of Satanism began to venerate his core characteristics as a bringer of freedom and enlightenment; meanwhile, Freemasons have been accused by anti-masonic literature, hoaxes and conspiracy theories as worshipping Lucifer as a deity.

== Roman folklore and etymology ==
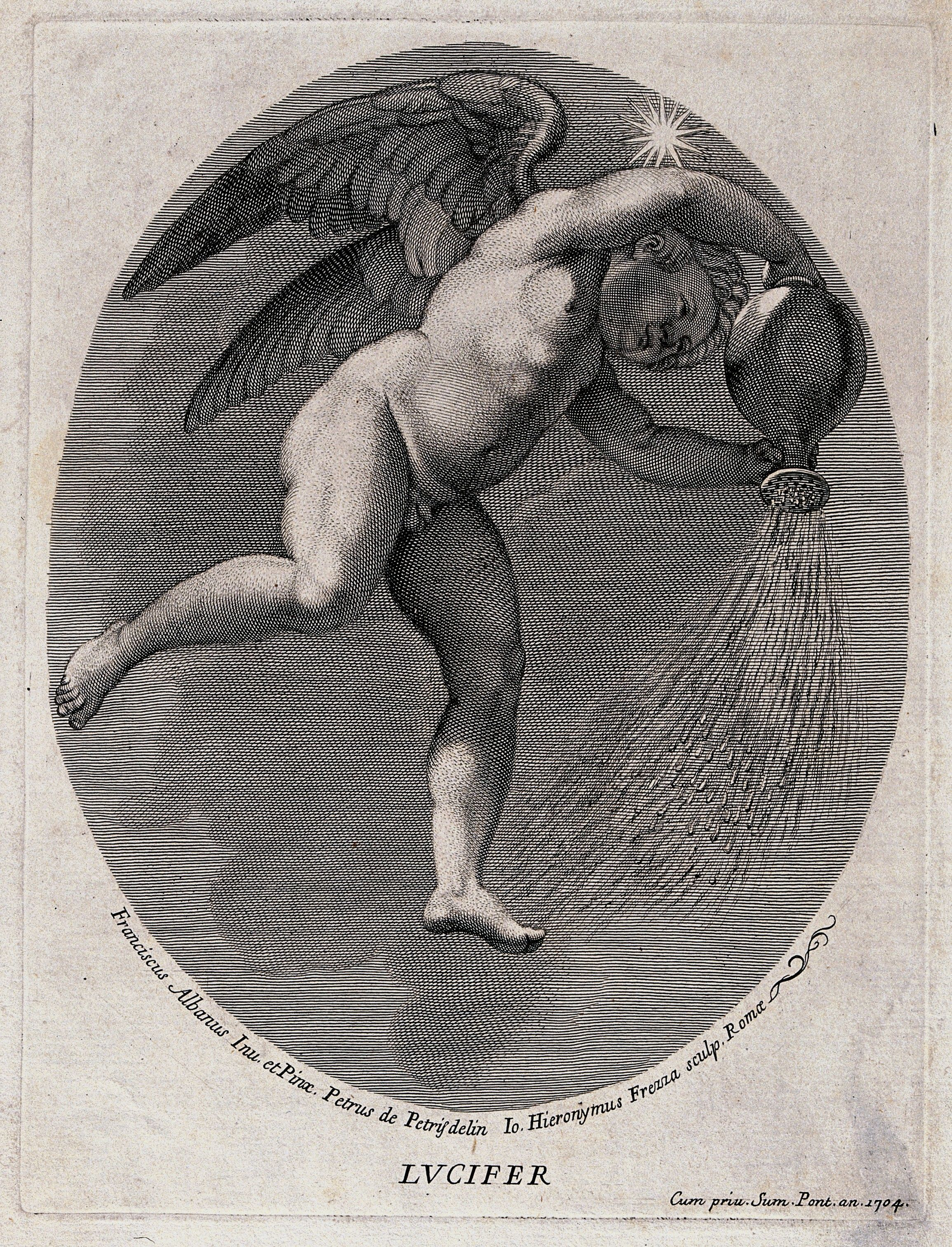
Lucifer (the morning star) represented as a winged child pouring light from a jar. Engraving by G. H. Frezza, 1704.

In Roman folklore, Lucifer ("light-bringer" in Latin) was the name of the planet Venus, though it was often personified as a male figure bearing a torch. The Greek name for this planet was variously Phosphoros Φωσφόρος (also meaning "light-bringer") or Heosphoros/Eosphoros Ἑωσφόρος (meaning "dawn-bringer"). Lucifer was said to be "the fabled son of Aurora and Cephalus, and father of Ceyx". He was often presented in poetry as heralding the dawn.

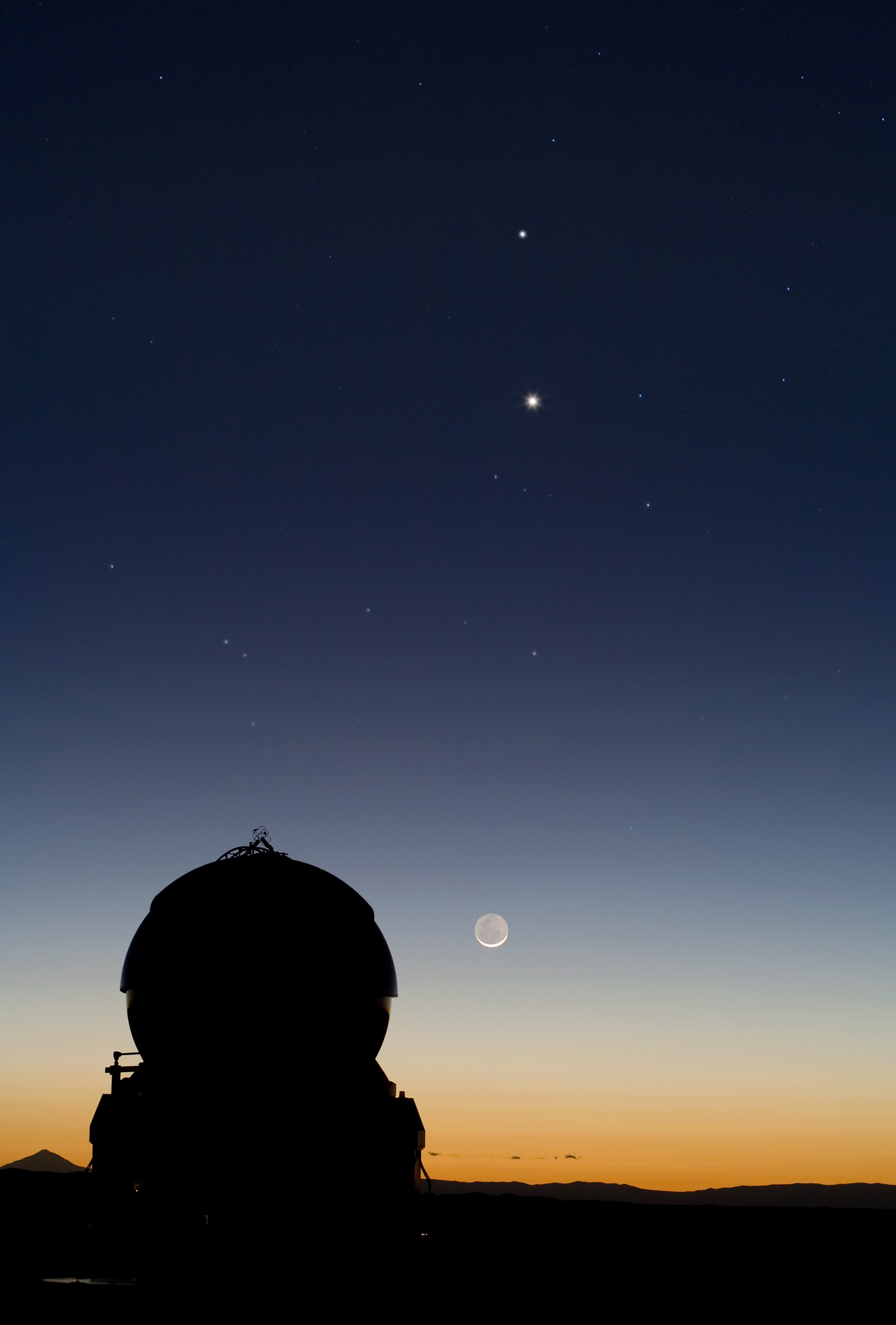
Planet Venus in alignment with Mercury (above) and the Moon (below)

The Latin word corresponding to Greek Phosphoros is Lucifer. It is used in its astronomical sense both in prose (Note: Cicero wrote: Stella Veneris, quae Φωσφόρος Graece, Latine dicitur Lucifer, cum antegreditur solem, cum subsequitur autem Hesperos. ("The star of Venus, called Φωσφόρος in Greek and Lucifer in Latin when it precedes, Hesperos when it follows the sun".) (Note: Pliny the Elder: Sidus appellatum Veneris [...] ante matutinum exoriens Luciferi nomen accipit [...] contra ab occasu refulgens nuncupatur Vesper ("The star called Venus [...] when it rises in the morning is given the name Lucifer [...] but when it shines at sunset it is called Vesper".)) and poetry. (Note: Virgil wrote: Luciferi primo cum sidere frigida rura carpamus, dum mane novum, dum gramina canent ("Let us hasten, when first the Morning Star appears, to the cool pastures, while the day is new, while the grass is dewy")) (Note: Marcus Annaeus Lucanus: Lucifer a Casia prospexit rupe diemque misit in Aegypton primo quoque sole calentem ("The morning-star looked forth from Mount Casius and sent the daylight over Egypt, where even sunrise is hot")) Poets sometimes personify the star, placing it in a mythological context. As the Latin name for the morning appearances of the planet Venus, it corresponds not only to the Greek names Phosphoros and Eosphoros, but also to the Egyptian name Tioumoutiri, and the Old English term Morgensteorra (morning star).

A similar name used by the Roman poet Catullus for the planet in its evening aspect is "Noctifer" (Night-Bringer). This name respectively corresponded to not only the Greek name Hesperus Ἕσπερος (star of the evening), but also the Egyptian name Ouaiti, and the Old English term Æfensteorra (evening star).

Latin Lūcifer "light-bringer, morning star" (lux + ferre); used in the Vulgate for Isaiah 14:12 (Hebrew הֵילֵל בֶּן־שָׁחַר, Helel ben Shahar; translates to "Shining One, Son of the morning/dawn"), later applied to Satan in Christian tradition. (Note: Ovid wrote: [...] vigil nitido patefecit ab ortu purpureas Aurora fores et plena rosarum atria: diffugiunt stellae, quarum agmina cogit Lucifer et caeli statione novissimus exit ("Aurora, awake in the glowing east, opens wide her bright doors, and her rose-filled courts. The stars, whose ranks are shepherded by Lucifer the morning star, vanish, and he, last of all, leaves his station in the sky")) (Note: Statius: Et iam Mygdoniis elata cubilibus alto impulerat caelo gelidas Aurora tenebras, rorantes excussa comas multumque sequenti sole rubens; illi roseus per nubila seras aduertit flammas alienumque aethera tardo Lucifer exit equo, donec pater igneus orbem impleat atque ipsi radios uetet esse sorori ("And now Aurora rising from her Mygdonian couch had driven the cold darkness on from high in the heavens, shaking out her dewy hair, her face blushing red at the pursuing sun – from him roseate Lucifer averts his fires lingering in the clouds and with reluctant horse leaves the heavens no longer his, until the blazing father make full his orb and forbid even his sister her beams")) The translation of the Hebrew word הֵילֵל, hêlēl means "Shining One".

The 2nd-century Roman mythographer Hyginus said of the planet:

The fourth star is that of Venus, Luciferus by name. Some say it is Juno's. In many tales it is recorded that it is called Hesperus, too. It seems to be the largest of all stars. Some have said it represents the son of Aurora and Cephalus, who surpassed many in beauty, so that he even vied with Venus, and, as Eratosthenes says, for this reason it is called the star of Venus. It is visible both at dawn and sunset, and so properly has been called both Luciferus and Hesperus.

The Latin poet Ovid, in his 1st-century epic Metamorphoses, describes Lucifer as ordering the heavens:

Aurora, watchful in the reddening dawn, threw wide her crimson doors and rose-filled halls; the Stellae took flight, in marshaled order set by Lucifer who left his station last.

Ovid, speaking of Phosphorus and Hesperus (the Evening Star, the evening appearance of the planet Venus) as identical, makes him the father of Daedalion. Ovid also makes him the father of Ceyx, while the Latin grammarian Servius makes him the father of the Hesperides or of Hesperis.

In the classical Roman period, Lucifer was not typically regarded as a deity and had few, if any, myths, though the planet was associated with various deities and often poetically personified. Cicero stated that "You say that Sol and Luna are deities, and the Greeks identify the former with Apollo and the latter with Diana. But if Luna is a goddess, then Lucifer (the Morning-Star) also and the rest of the Wandering Stars (Stellae Errantes) will have to be counted gods; and if so, then the Fixed Stars (Stellae Inerrantes) as well."

== In the Bible ==
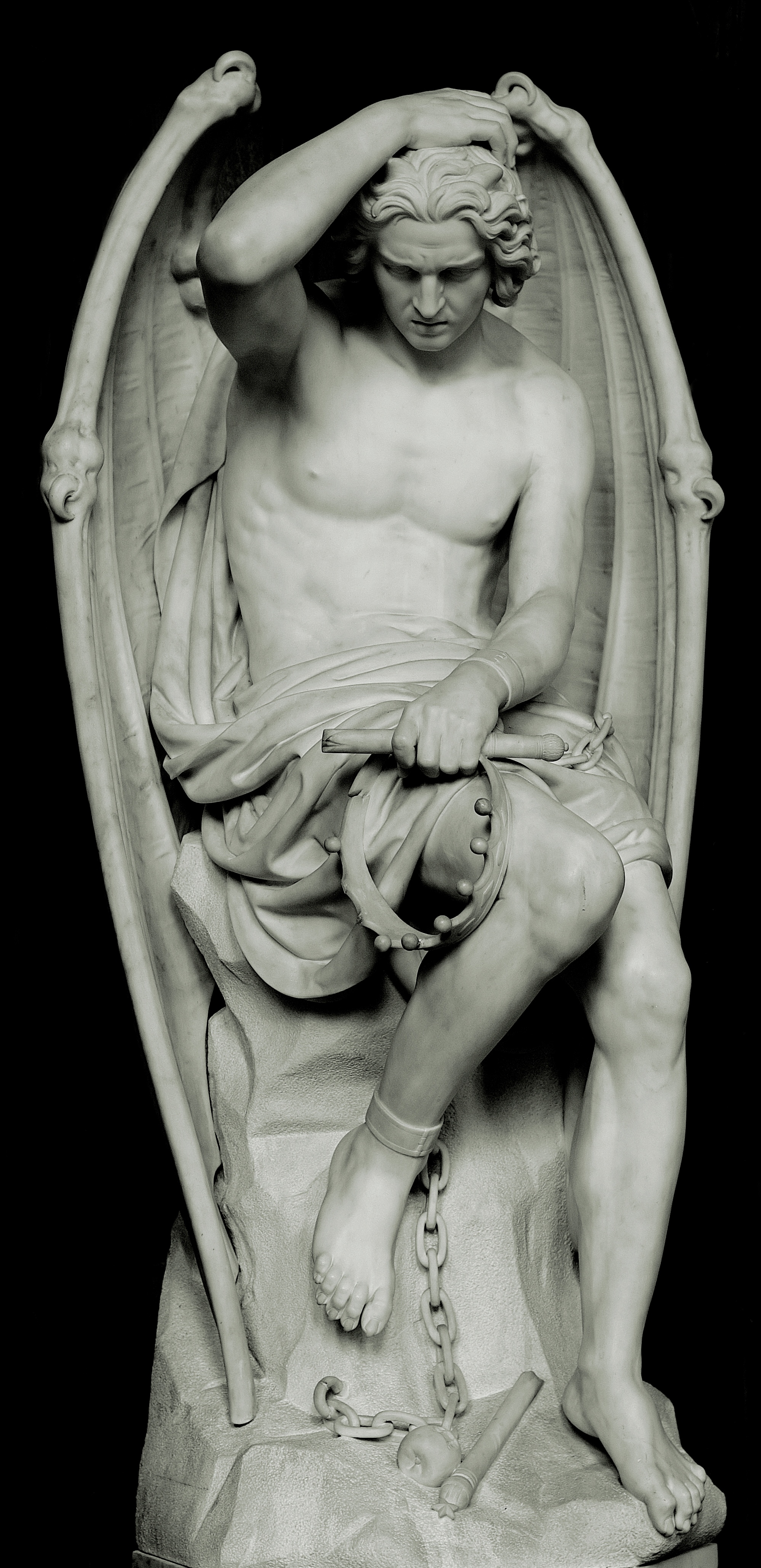
Le génie du mal (1848) by Guillaume Geefs (Liège Cathedral), known in English as The Genius of Evil, The Spirit of Evil, The Lucifer of Liège, or simply Lucifer.

In the Book of Isaiah, chapter 14, the king of Babylon is condemned in a prophetic vision by the prophet Isaiah and is addressed as הֵילֵל בֶּן-שָׁחַר (Helel ben Shachar, Hebrew for "shining one, son of the morning"), The title "Helel ben Shachar" refers to the planet Venus as the morning star, and that is how the Hebrew word is usually interpreted. The Hebrew word transliterated as Hêlêl or Heylel occurs only once in the Hebrew Bible. The Septuagint renders הֵילֵל in Greek as Ἑωσφόρος (Heōsphoros), "bringer of dawn", the Ancient Greek name for the morning star. Similarly the Vulgate renders הֵילֵל in Latin as Lucifer, the name in that language for the morning star. According to the King James Bible-based Strong's Concordance, the original Hebrew word means "shining one, light-bearer", and the English translation given in the King James text is the Latin name for the planet Venus, "Lucifer", as it was already in the Wycliffe Bible.

However, the translation of הֵילֵל as "Lucifer" has been abandoned in modern English translations of Isaiah 14:12. Present-day translations render הֵילֵל as "morning star" (New International Version, New Century Version, New American Standard Bible, Good News Translation, Holman Christian Standard Bible, Contemporary English Version, Common English Bible, Complete Jewish Bible), "daystar" (New Jerusalem Bible, The Message), "Day Star" (New Revised Standard Version, English Standard Version), "shining one" (New Life Version, New World Translation, JPS Tanakh), or "shining star" (New Living Translation).

In a modern translation from the original Hebrew, the passage in which the phrase "Lucifer" or "morning star" occurs begins with the statement: "On the day the Lord gives you relief from your suffering and turmoil and from the harsh labour forced on you, you will take up this taunt against the king of Babylon: How the oppressor has come to an end! How his fury has ended!" After describing the death of the king, the taunt continues:

How you have fallen from heaven, morning star, son of the dawn! You have been cast down to the earth, you who once laid low the nations! You said in your heart, "I will ascend to the heavens; I will raise my throne above the stars of God; I will sit enthroned on the mount of assembly, on the utmost heights of Mount Zaphon. I will ascend above the tops of the clouds; I will make myself like the Most High." But you are brought down to the realm of the dead, to the depths of the pit. Those who see you stare at you, they ponder your fate: "Is this the man who shook the earth and made kingdoms tremble, the man who made the world a wilderness, who overthrew its cities and would not let his captives go home?"

For the unnamed "king of Babylon", a wide range of identifications have been proposed. They include a Babylonian ruler of the prophet Isaiah's own time, the later Nebuchadnezzar II, under whom the Babylonian captivity of the Jews began, or Nabonidus, and the Assyrian kings Tiglath-Pileser, Sargon II and Sennacherib. Verse 20 says that this king of Babylon will not be "joined with them [all the kings of the nations] in burial, because thou hast destroyed thy land, thou hast slain thy people; the seed of evil-doers shall not be named for ever", but rather be cast out of the grave, while "All the kings of the nations, all of them, sleep in glory, every one in his own house." Herbert Wolf held that the "king of Babylon" was not a specific ruler but a generic representation of the whole line of rulers.

=== Christian interpretations ===
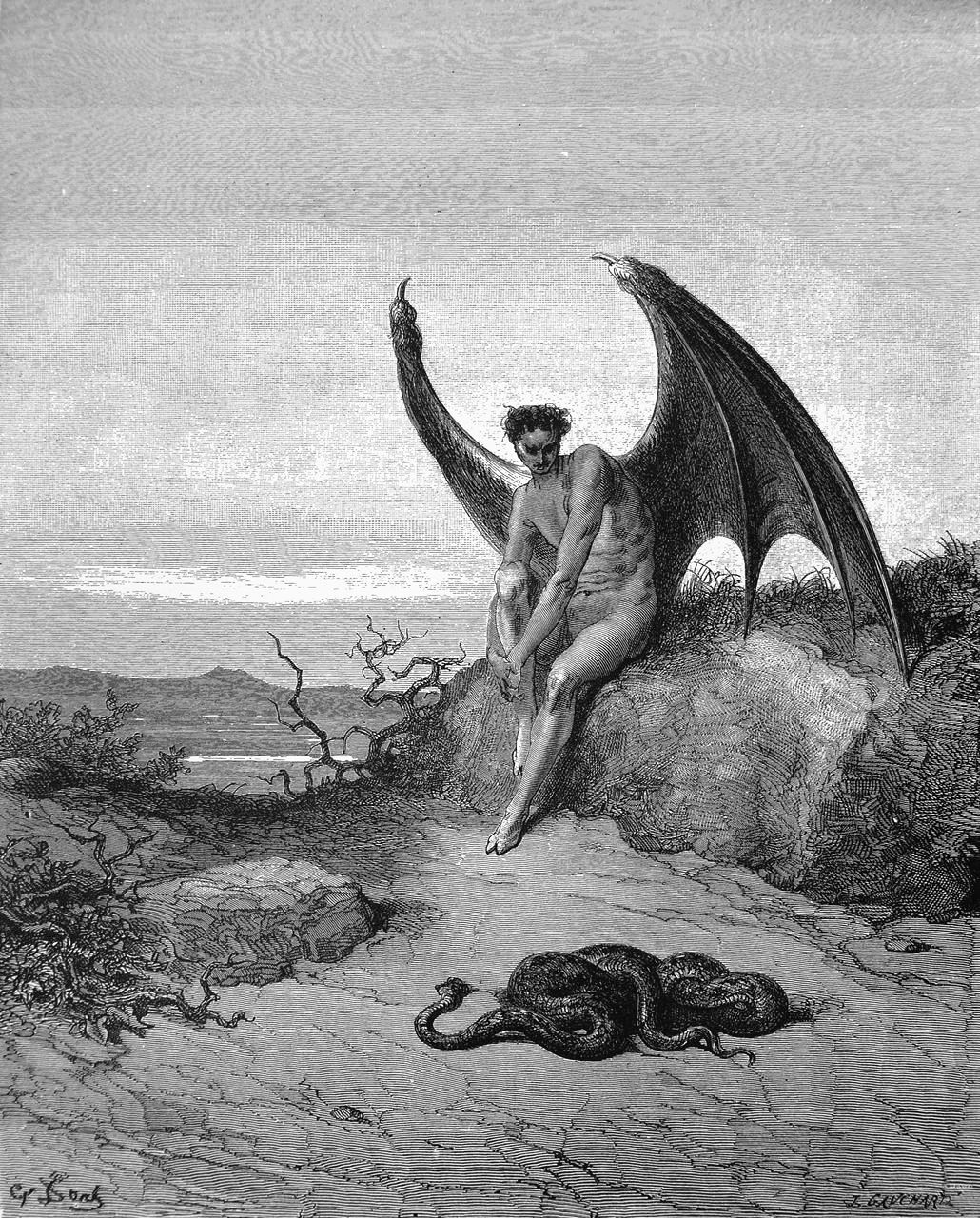
Gustave Doré, illustration to Paradise Lost, book IX, 179–187: "he [Satan] held on / His midnight search, where soonest he might finde / The Serpent: him fast sleeping soon he found"

Isaiah 14:12 became a source for the popular conception of the fallen angel motif. Rabbinic Judaism has rejected any belief in rebel or fallen angels. In the 11th century, the Pirkei De-Rabbi Eliezer illustrates the origin of the "fallen angel myth" by giving two accounts, one relates to the angel in the Garden of Eden who seduces Eve, and the other relates to the angels, the benei elohim who cohabit with the daughters of man (Genesis 6:1–4). An association of Isaiah 14:12–18 with a personification of evil, called the devil, developed outside of mainstream Rabbinic Judaism in pseudepigrapha, and later in Christian writings, particularly with the apocalypses.

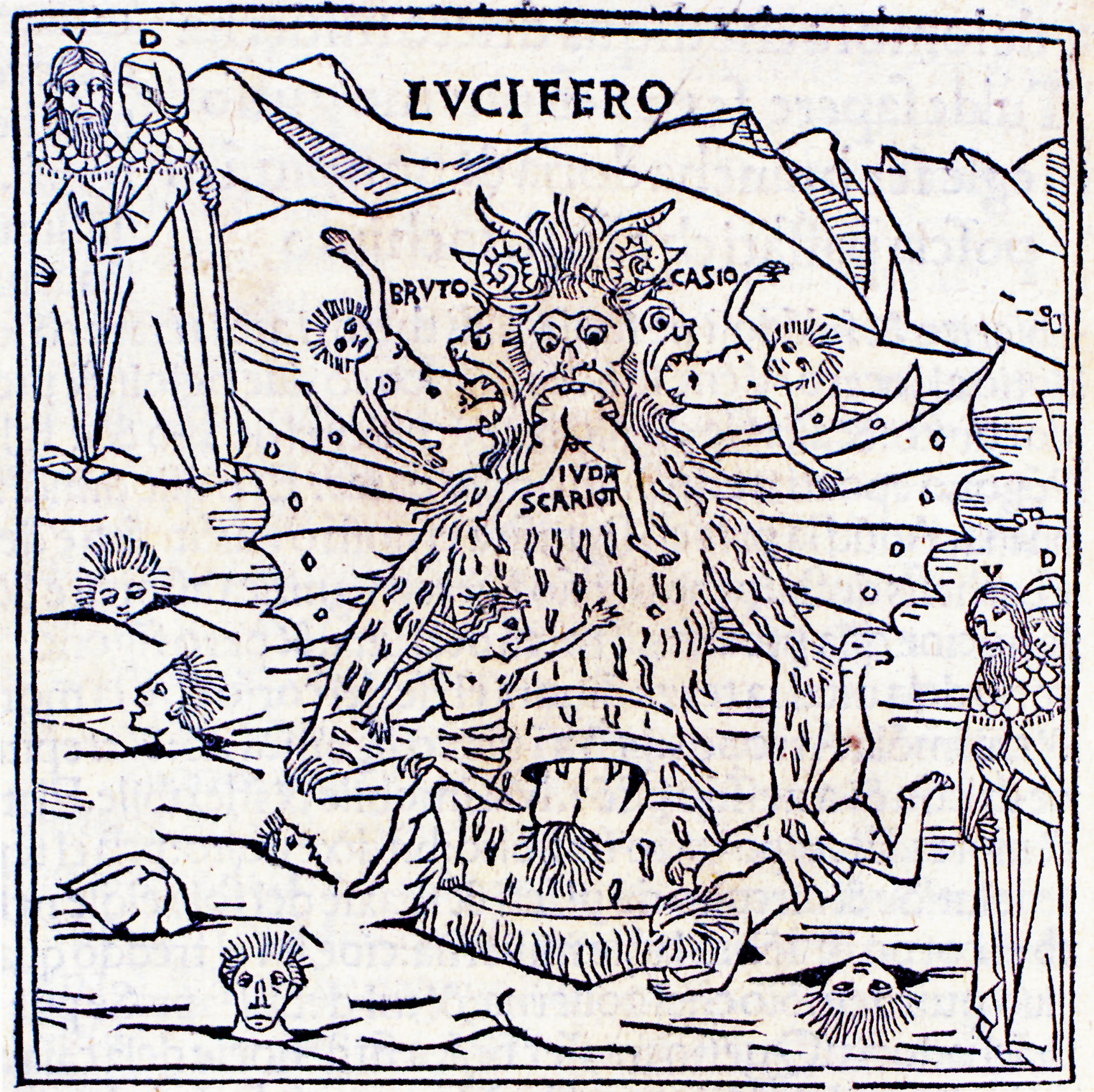
Illustration of Lucifer in the first fully illustrated print edition of Dante Alighieri's Divine Comedy. Woodcut for Inferno, canto 33. Pietro di Piasi, Venice, 1491.

The metaphor of the morning star that Isaiah 14:12 applied to a king of Babylon gave rise to the general use of the Latin word for "morning star", capitalized, as the original name of the devil before his fall from grace, linking Isaiah 14:12 with Luke 10 ("I saw Satan fall like lightning from heaven") and interpreting the passage in Isaiah as an allegory of Satan's fall from heaven.

Considering pride as a major sin peaking in self-deification, Lucifer (Hêlêl) became the template for the devil. As a result, Lucifer was identified with the devil in Christianity and in Christian popular literature, as in Dante Alighieri's Inferno, Joost van den Vondel's Lucifer, and John Milton's Paradise Lost. Early medieval Christianity fairly distinguished between Lucifer and Satan. While Lucifer, as the devil, is fixated in hell, Satan executes the desires of Lucifer as his vassal.

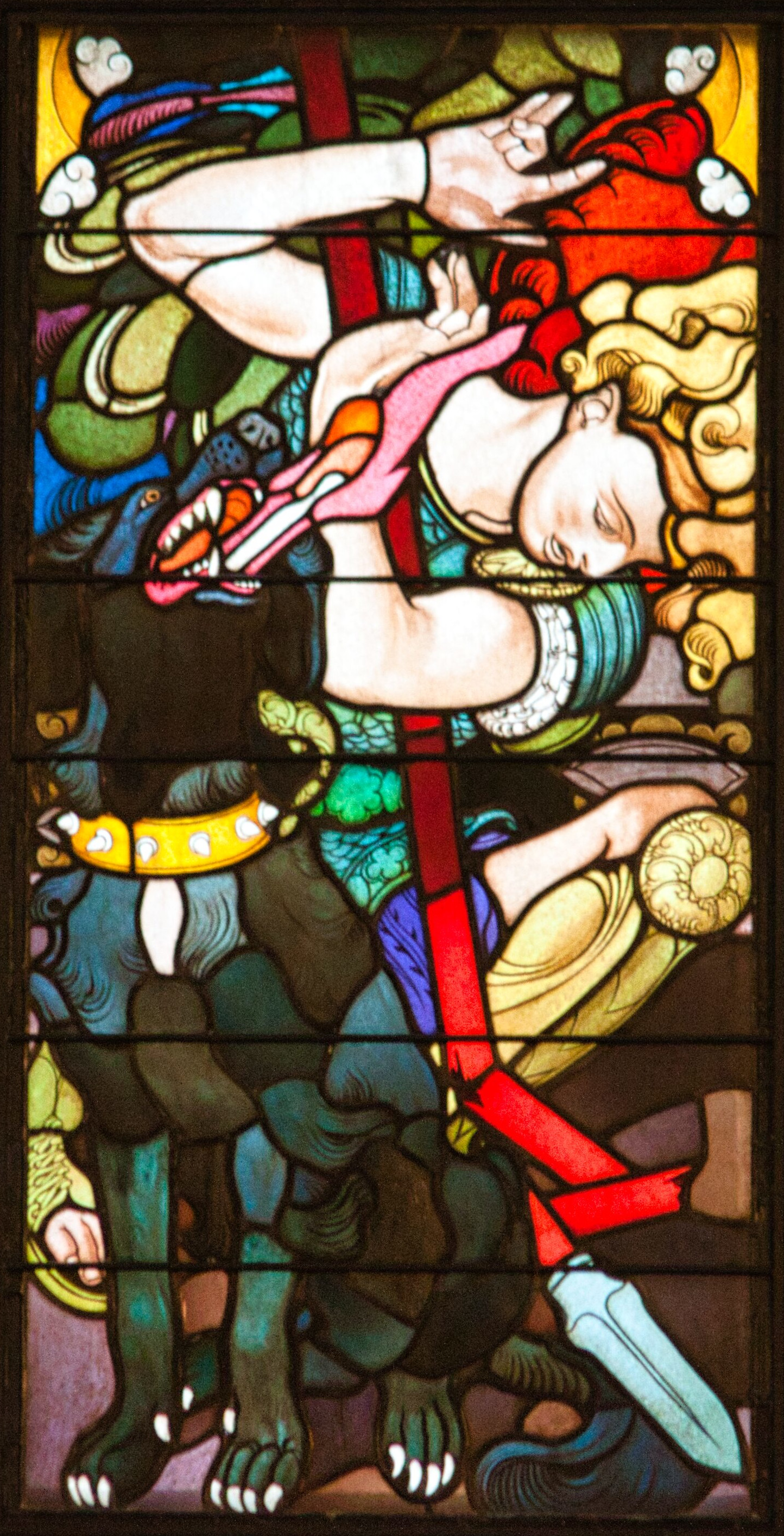
J. Mehoffer, fallen Lucifer and the hound of hell

Aquila of Sinope derives the word hêlêl, the Hebrew name for the morning star, from the verb yalal (to lament). This derivation was adopted as a proper name for an angel who laments the loss of his former beauty. The Christian church fathers – for example Jerome, in his Vulgate – translated this as Lucifer.

Some Christian writers have applied the name "Lucifer" as used in the Book of Isaiah, and the motif of a heavenly being cast down to the earth, to the devil. Sigve K. Tonstad argues that the New Testament War in Heaven theme of Revelation 12, in which the dragon "who is called the devil and Satan [...] was thrown down to the earth", was derived from the passage about the Babylonian king in Isaiah 14. Origen (184/185–253/254) interpreted such Old Testament passages as being about manifestations of the devil. Origen was not the first to interpret the Isaiah 14 passage as referring to the devil: he was preceded by at least Tertullian (c. 160 – c. 225), who in his Adversus Marcionem (book 5, chapters 11 and 17) twice presents as spoken by the devil the words of Isaiah 14:14: "I will ascend above the tops of the clouds; I will make myself like the Most High". Though Tertullian was a speaker of the language in which the word was created, "Lucifer" is not among the numerous names and phrases he used to describe the devil. Even at the time of Augustine of Hippo (354–430), a contemporary of the composition of the Vulgate, "Lucifer" had not yet become a common name for the devil.

Augustine's work Civitas Dei (5th century) became the major opinion of Western demonology including in the Catholic Church. For Augustine, the rebellion of the Devil was the first and final cause of evil. By this he rejected some earlier teachings about Satan having fallen when the world was already created. Further, Augustine rejects the idea that envy could have been the first sin (as some early Christians believed, evident from sources like the Cave of Treasures in which Satan has fallen because he envies humans and refused to prostrate himself before Adam), since pride ("loving yourself more than others and God") is required to be envious ("hatred for the happiness of others"). He argues that evil came first into existence by the free will of Satan. His attempt to take God's throne is not an assault on the gates of heaven, but a turn to solipsism in which the Devil becomes God in his world. When the king of Babylon uttered his phrase in Isaiah, he was speaking through the sprite of Lucifer, the head of devils. He concluded that everyone who falls away from God are within the body of Lucifer, and is a devil.

Adherents of the King James Only movement and others who hold that Isaiah 14:12 does indeed refer to the Devil have decried the modern translations. An opposing view attributes to Origen the first identification of the "Lucifer" of Isaiah 14:12 with the Devil and to Tertullian and Augustine of Hippo the spread of the story of Lucifer as fallen through pride, envy of God and jealousy of humans.

The 1409 Lollard manuscript titled Lanterne of Light associated Lucifer with the deadly sin of pride.

Protestant theologian John Calvin rejected the identification of Lucifer with Satan or the Devil. He said: "The exposition of this passage, which some have given, as if it referred to Satan, has arisen from ignorance: for the context plainly shows these statements must be understood in reference to the king of the Babylonians." Martin Luther also considered it a gross error to refer this verse to the Devil.

Counter-Reformation writers, like Albertanus of Brescia, classified the seven deadly sins each to a specific Biblical demon. He, as well as Peter Binsfield, assigned Lucifer to the sin of pride.

Since Lucifer's sin mainly consists of self-deification, some Gnostic sects identified Lucifer with the creator deity in the Old Testament. In the Bogomil and Cathar text Gospel of the Secret Supper, Lucifer is a glorified angel but fell from heaven to establish his own kingdom and became the Demiurge who created the material world and trapped souls from heaven inside matter. Jesus descended to earth to free the captured souls. In contrast to mainstream Christianity, the cross was denounced as a symbol of Lucifer and his instrument in an attempt to kill Jesus.

Lucifer is regarded within the Latter Day Saint movement as the pre-mortal name of the Devil. Latter-day Saint theology teaches that in a heavenly council, Lucifer rebelled against the plan of God the Father and was subsequently cast out. The Doctrine and Covenants reads:

And this we saw also, and bear record, that an angel of God who was in authority in the presence of God, who rebelled against the Only Begotten Son whom the Father loved and who was in the bosom of the Father, was thrust down from the presence of God and the Son, and was called Perdition, for the heavens wept over him—he was Lucifer, a son of the morning. And we beheld, and lo, he is fallen! is fallen, even a son of the morning! And while we were yet in the Spirit, the Lord commanded us that we should write the vision; for we beheld Satan, that old serpent, even the devil, who rebelled against God, and sought to take the kingdom of our God and his Christ—Wherefore, he maketh war with the saints of God, and encompasseth them round about.

— Doctrine and Covenants 76:25–29

After becoming Satan by his fall, Lucifer "goeth up and down, to and fro in the earth, seeking to destroy the souls of men." Members of the Church of Jesus Christ of Latter-day Saints consider Isaiah 14:12 to be referring to both the king of the Babylonians and the Devil.

=== Comparative religion ===
==== Sumerian folklore and origins of the Biblical tale ====
The motif of a heavenly being striving for the highest seat of heaven only to be cast down to the underworld has its origins in the motions of the planet Venus, known as the morning star.

A similar theme is present in the Babylonian myth of Etana. The Jewish Encyclopedia comments:

The brilliancy of the morning star, which eclipses all other stars, but is not seen during the night, may easily have given rise to a myth such as was told of Ethana and Zu: he was led by his pride to strive for the highest seat among the star-gods on the northern mountain of the gods [...] but was hurled down by the supreme ruler of the Babylonian Olympus.

The fall from heaven motif also has a parallel in Canaanite mythology. In ancient Canaanite religion, the morning star is personified as the god Athtar, who attempted to occupy the throne of Ba'al and, finding he was unable to do so, descended and ruled the underworld. The original myth may have been about the lesser god Helel trying to dethrone the Canaanite high god El, who lived on a mountain to the north. Hermann Gunkel's reconstruction of the myth told of a mighty warrior called Hêlal, whose ambition was to ascend higher than all the other stellar divinities, but who had to descend to the depths; it thus portrayed as a battle the process by which the bright morning star fails to reach the highest point in the sky before being faded out by the rising sun.

This Jewish tradition has echoes also in Jewish pseudepigrapha such as 2 Enoch and the Life of Adam and Eve. The Life of Adam and Eve, in turn, shaped the idea of Iblis in the Quran.

==== Arabian legends ====
According to Arabian legend the star Suhail (Canopus) was cast down from his original place to a lower place in heaven; a story parallel to that of Lucifer. As recorded by Ibn Abbas, a companion of the Islamic prophet Muhammad, Suhail had once been the intermediary between the authority of command and the stars which had the position of soldiers. From that place he become the originator of rebellion and was eventually degraded and cast down to the southern sky.

The notion that the stars are soldiers may originate from Persian beliefs, but also appears in the Ethiopian Book of Enoch: "And the stars which roll over the fire are they which have been transgressed the commandment of the Lord in the beginning of their rising, because they did not come forth at their appointed time."

Another legend states that Suhail was once a Yemenite tithe-collector, but was transformed into a star as punishment for his unjust dealings. The idea that people turn into stars as a form of punishment is common in Arabian legend. The planet Venus was, according to Arabian myth, a beautiful woman who was transformed into a star for having seduced two angels.

== Influence of the conception of Lucifer as the Devil ==
=== Satanism ===
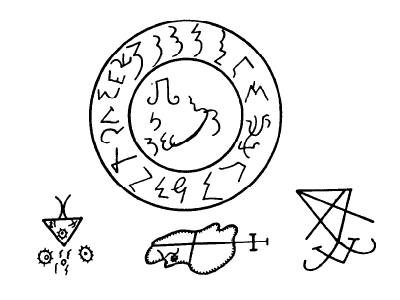
The Sigil of Lucifer used by modern Satanists (left), originating from the 18th century Grimorium Verum (right).

Luciferianism is a belief structure that venerates the fundamental traits that are attributed to Lucifer. The custom usually reveres Lucifer not as the Devil, but as a savior, a guardian or instructing spirit or even the true god as opposed to Jehovah.

In LaVeyan Satanism, Lucifer is described by The Satanic Bible as one of the four crown princes of hell, particularly that of the East, the "lord of the air", and is called the bringer of light, the morning star, intellectualism, and enlightenment.

=== Anthroposophy ===
Rudolf Steiner's writings, which formed the basis for Anthroposophy, characterised Lucifer as a spiritual opposite to Ahriman, with Christ between the two forces, mediating a balanced path for humanity. Lucifer represents an intellectual, imaginative, delusional, otherworldly force which might be associated with visions, subjectivity, psychosis and fantasy. He associated Lucifer with the religious/philosophical cultures of Egypt, Rome and Greece. Steiner believed that Lucifer, as a supersensible Being, had incarnated in China about 3000 years before the birth of Christ. Steiner considered the Eastern nations as being Luciferian in outlook while Western Europe was operating on Ahrimanic principles, both playing a symbolic role for the evolution of mankind.

=== Theosophy ===
In the work of Helena Blavatsky and Theosophy, Lucifer is understood not as a personal being or devil, but an internal force and principle residing in the consciousness of humanity. He is referred to as "our mind, our tempter, redeemer, our intelligent liberator and saviour from pure animalism", and defined as "the spirit of intellectual enlightenment and freedom of thought". In Theosophy, Lucifer is also paralleled with the Greek Prometheus, both being seen as cultural heroes who sacrificed themselves for the independence of humanity.

Alice A. Bailey and Foster Bailey initially founded the Lucifer Publishing Company in 1922, later renaming it the Lucis Publishing Company under the umbrella of Lucis Trust; they are named after the theosophical concept of the "light bearer" who introduced intelligence.

=== Freemasonry ===
Léo Taxil (1854–1907) claimed that Freemasonry is associated with worshipping Lucifer. In what is known as the Taxil hoax, he alleged that leading Freemason Albert Pike had addressed "The 23 Supreme Confederated Councils of the World" (an invention of Taxil), instructing them that Lucifer was God, and was in opposition to the evil god Adonai. Taxil promoted a book by Diana Vaughan (actually written by Taxil, as he later confessed publicly) that purported to reveal a highly secret ruling body called the Palladium, which controlled the organization and had a satanic agenda. But, as described by Freemasonry Disclosed in 1897:

With frightening cynicism, the miserable person we shall not name here [Taxil] declared before an assembly especially convened for him that for twelve years he had prepared and carried out to the end the most sacrilegious of hoaxes. We have always been careful to publish special articles concerning Palladism and Diana Vaughan. We are now giving in this issue a complete list of these articles, which can now be considered as not having existed.

There are also a few genuine confirmed mentions of "Lucifer" in the writings of Albert Pike and other esoterically inclined Masonic scholars such as Manly P. Hall, but these are far more cryptic and obscure. As understood in Freemasonry, when these writers spoke about the "Luciferian path," or the "energies of Lucifer," they were referring to the Morning Star, the light bearer, the search for light; the very antithesis of dark. Pike writes in Morals and Dogma, "Lucifer, the Light-bearer! Strange and mysterious name to give to the Spirit of Darkness!" and "Lucifer, the Son of the Morning! Is it he who bears the Light, and with its splendors intolerable blinds feeble, sensual, or selfish Souls? Doubt it not!" Much has been made of these quotes, but they are used rhetorically by Pike, being philosophical and symbolic. The metaphorical allegory of "light bearer" is being deliberately contrasted with the "spirit of darkness", which indicates a struggle of illumination or knowledge against ignorance.

Taxil's work and Pike's supposed address continue to be quoted by fringe anti-masonic groups and conspiracy theorists.

In Devil-Worship in France, Arthur Edward Waite compared Taxil's work to today's tabloid journalism, replete with logical and factual inconsistencies.

=== Charles Godfrey Leland ===
In a collection of folklore and magical practices supposedly collected in Italy by Charles Godfrey Leland and published in his Aradia, or the Gospel of the Witches, the figure of Lucifer is featured prominently as both the brother and consort of the goddess Diana, and father of Aradia, at the center of an alleged Italian witch-cult. In Leland's mythology, Diana pursued her brother Lucifer across the sky as a cat pursues a mouse. According to Leland, after dividing herself into light and darkness:

[...] Diana saw that the light was so beautiful, the light which was her other half, her brother Lucifer, she yearned for it with exceeding great desire. Wishing to receive the light again into her darkness, to swallow it up in rapture, in delight, she trembled with desire. This desire was the Dawn. But Lucifer, the light, fled from her, and would not yield to her wishes; he was the light which flies into the most distant parts of heaven, the mouse which flies before the cat.

Here, the motions of Diana and Lucifer once again mirror the celestial motions of the moon and Venus, respectively. Though Leland's Lucifer is based on the classical personification of the planet Venus, he also incorporates elements from Christian tradition, as in the following passage:

Diana greatly loved her brother Lucifer, the god of the Sun and of the Moon, the god of Light (Splendor), who was so proud of his beauty, and who for his pride was driven from Paradise.

In the several modern Wiccan traditions based in part on Leland's work, the figure of Lucifer is usually either omitted or replaced as Diana's consort with either the Etruscan god Tagni, or Dianus (Janus, following the work of folklorist James Frazer in The Golden Bough).

=== Modern popular culture ===
In modern popular culture, Lucifer is often depicted as a charismatic, complex, and sometimes sympathetic figure rather than a purely evil being. He is frequently portrayed as a fallen angel with a rebellious streak, and may be intelligent, witty, and even morally conflicted.

In the TV series Supernatural, Lucifer is the main antagonist of the fifth season. The conflict between the good and evil angels is portrayed as a conflict between brothers. Despite being the villain in the story, he is held in higher regards than the antagonistic deities, as Lucifer defeats the pagan gods alone in one episode. His background story further adds to his moral ambiguity. His evil motivations are said to stem from his love to God: when God shows love for humanity and orders the angels to bow before them, Lucifer refuses, because he could only love God. His depictions are inspired by the Islamic traditions about Iblis and Satanael as a son of God in Bogomilism.

Notable examples of Lucifer in popular culture include the television series Lucifer (2016–2021), where he is a suave nightclub owner who rebelled against his lord-father and abandoned the role as Hell's warden, and The Sandman comics, which present him as a refined ruler of hell seeking independence, both stemming from DC Comics' interpretation of the religious figure. These portrayals emphasize his free will, disdain for authority, and struggle with his identity, often blending elements of myth, theology, and contemporary storytelling.

In J. R. R. Tolkien's legendarium, Melkor/Morgoth is analogous to Lucifer/Satan.

== Gallery ==
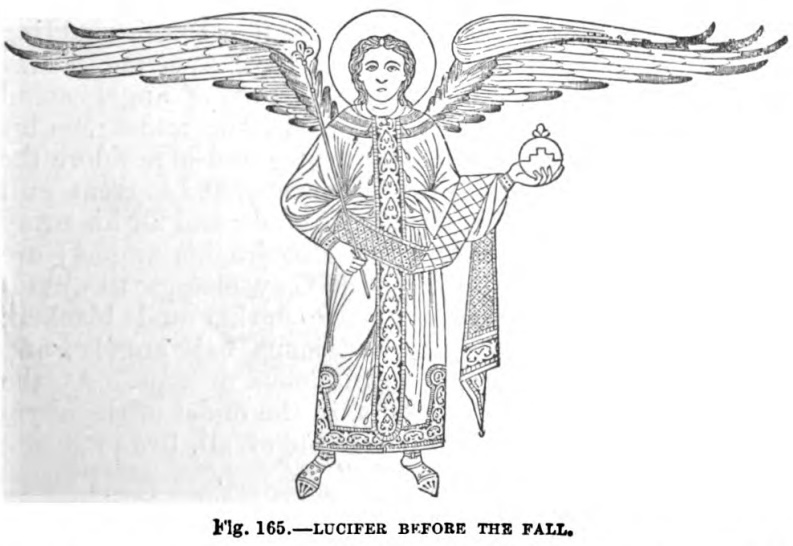
Lucifer before his fall as depicted in the Hortus deliciarum, 12th century (1891 reproduction)

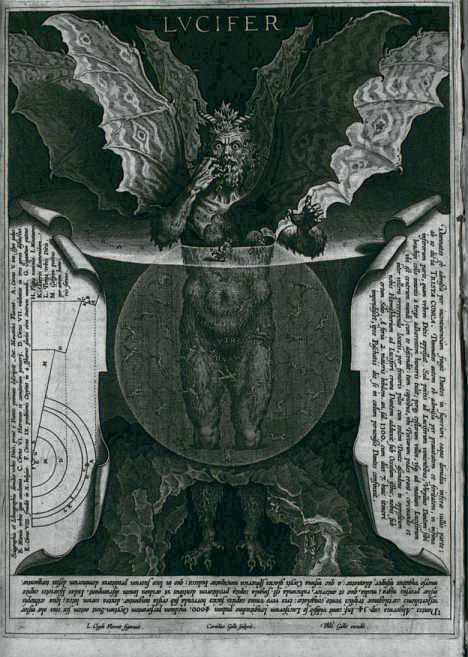
Lucifer, by Alessandro Vellutello (1534), for Dante's Inferno, canto 34

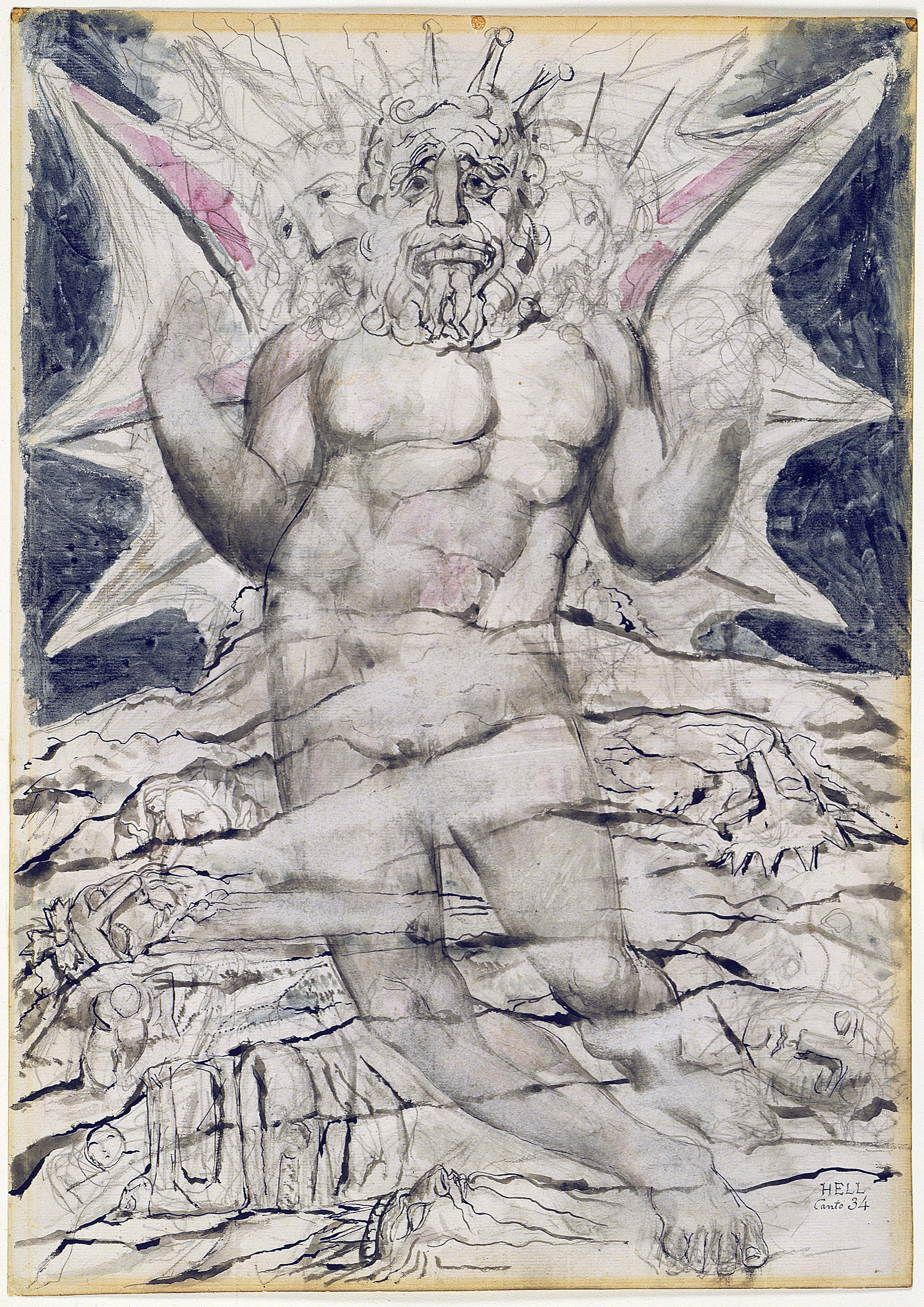
Lucifer, by William Blake, for Dante's Inferno, canto 34

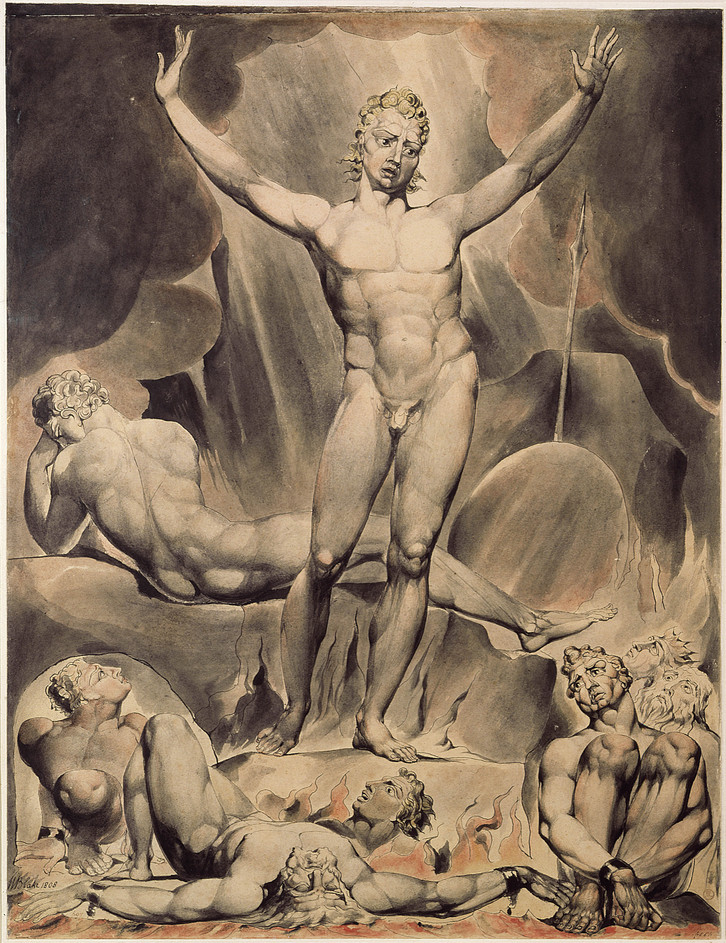
Satan arousing rebel angels in Milton's Paradise Lost, by William Blake

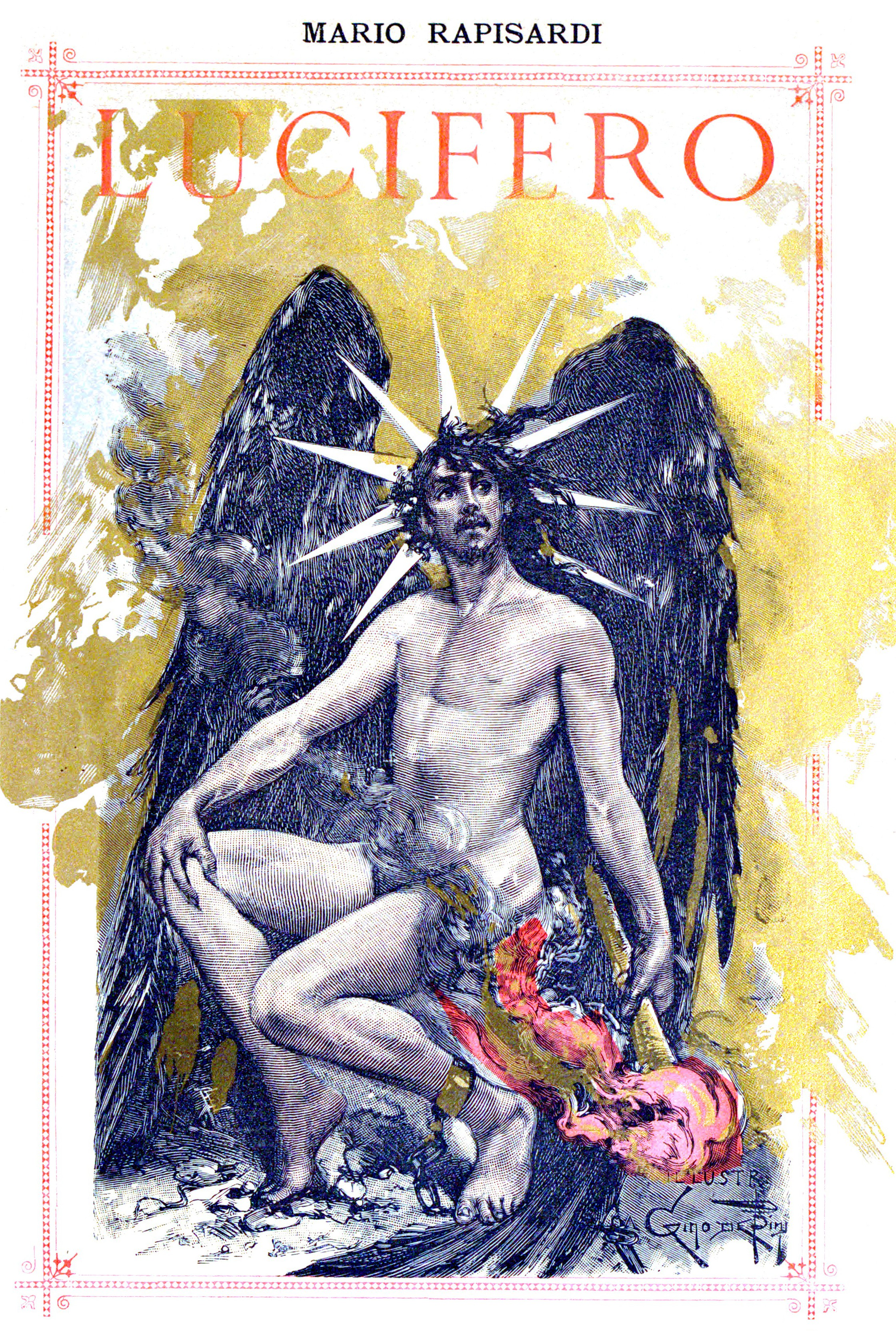
Cover of 1887 edition of Mario Rapisardi's poem Lucifero

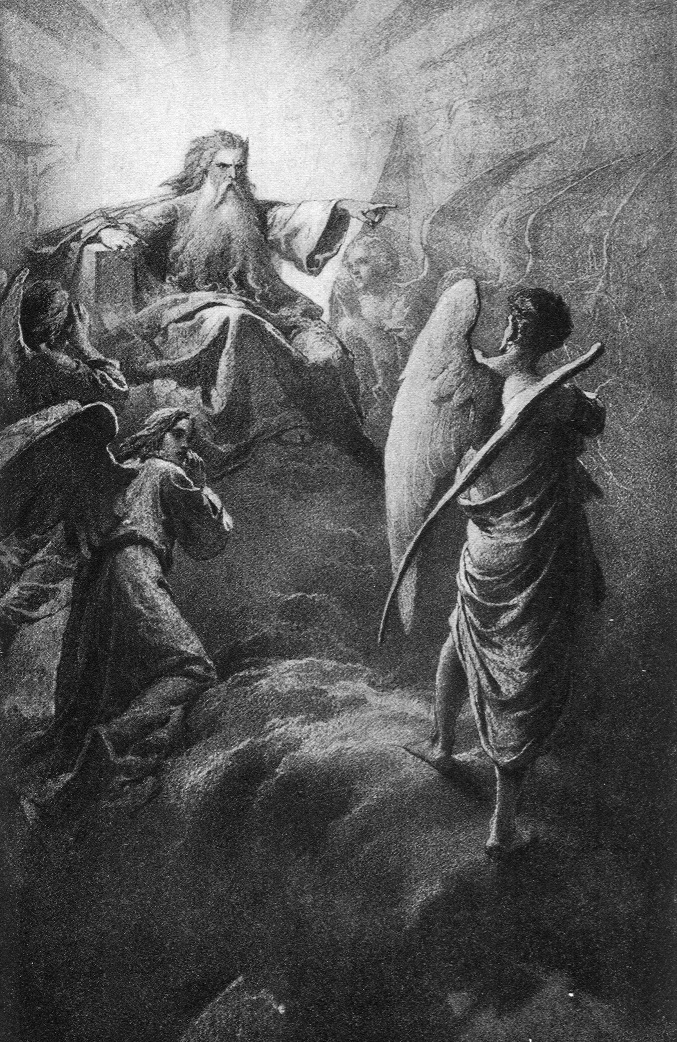
Lucifer before the Lord, by Mihály Zichy (19th century)

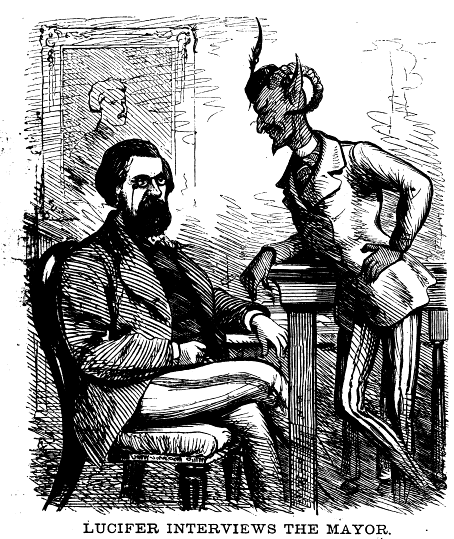
Mayor Hall and Lucifer, by an unknown artist (1870)

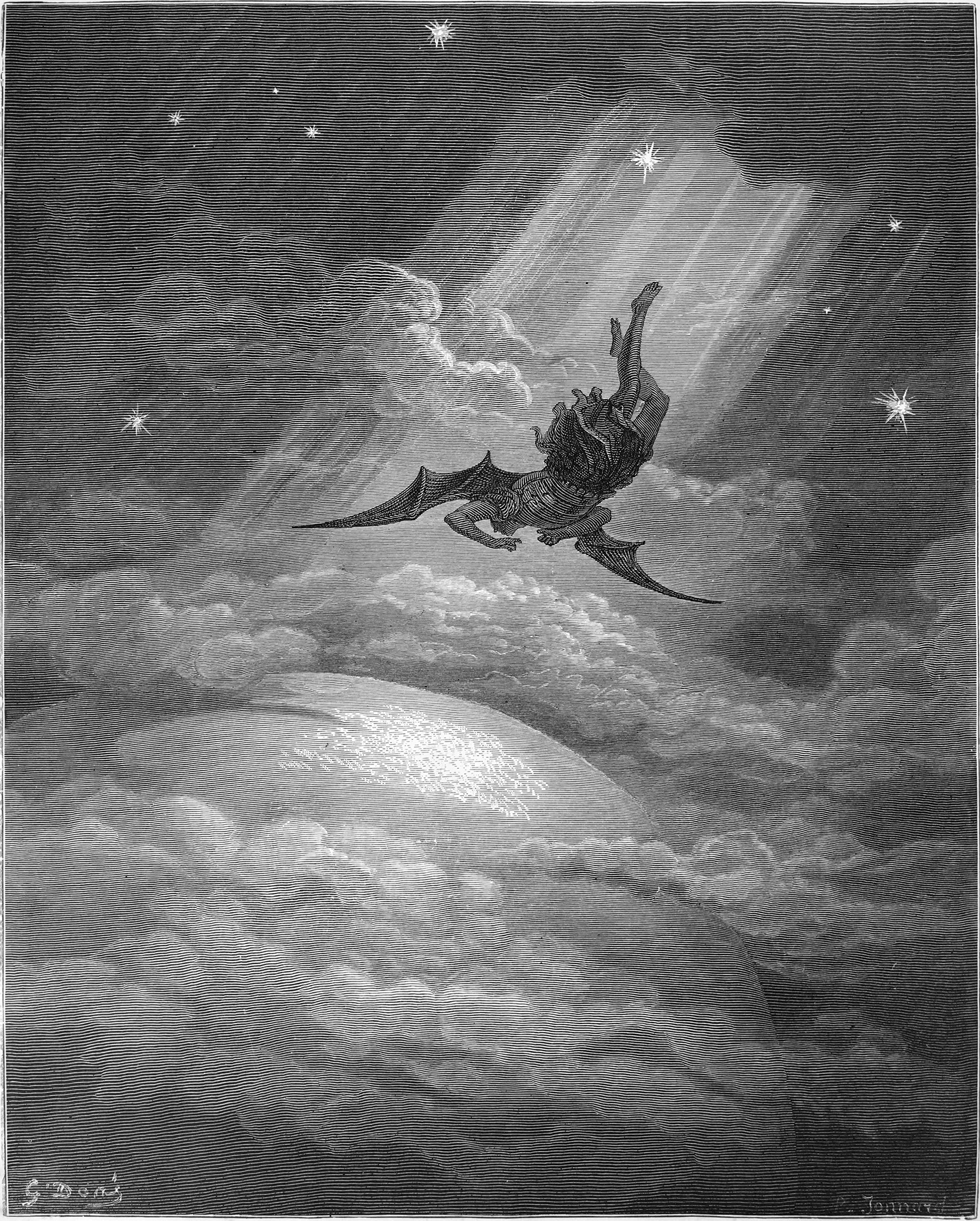
Gustave Doré's illustration for Milton's Paradise Lost, III, 739–742: Satan on his way to bring about the fall of man

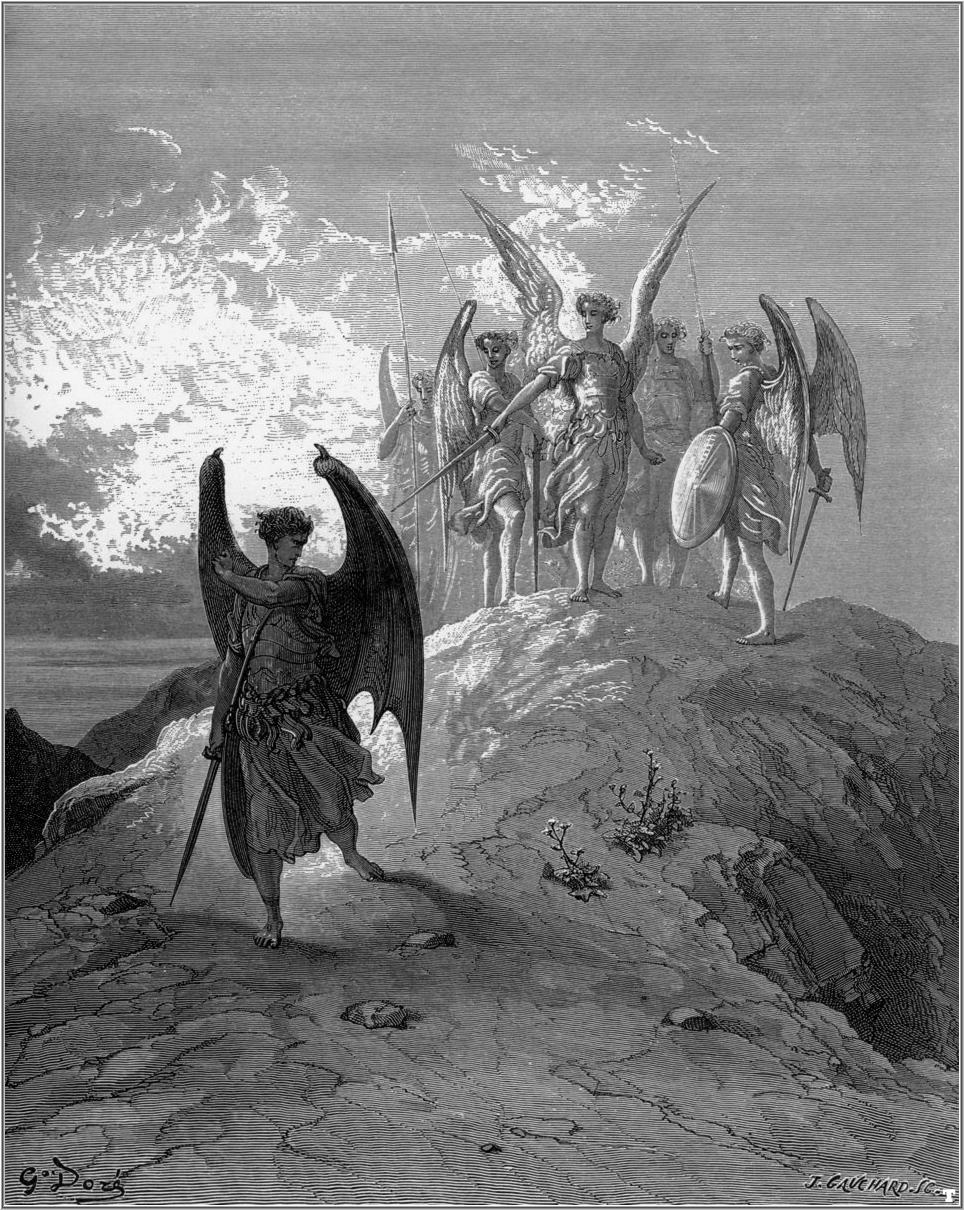
Gustave Doré's illustration for Milton's Paradise Lost, V, 1006–1015: Satan yielding before Gabriel

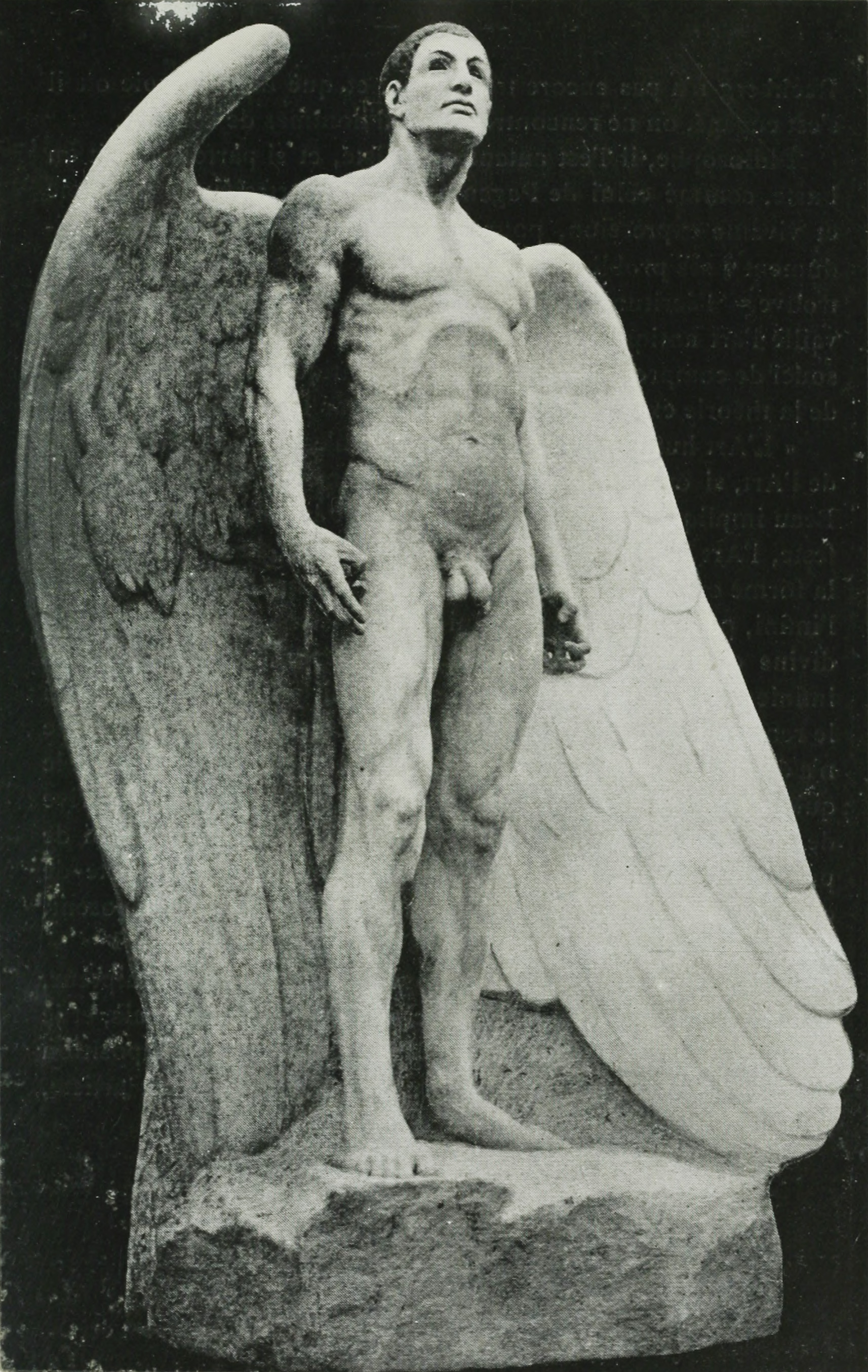
Lucifer, by Arnold Rechberg (1906)

== See also ==
- Angra Mainyu
- Aphrodite
- Astarte
- Asura
- Aurvandil, aka Earendel
- Azazil (Angelic name of Satan in Islam)
- Azazel
- Doctor Faustus, tragic play by Christopher Marlowe
- Erlik
- Guardian of the Threshold
- Inferno, first of the three canticas of Dante's Divine Comedy
- Luceafărul, a literary magazine
- Luceafărul, a poem by the poet Mihai Eminescu
- Lucifer and Prometheus
- The Lucifer Effect
- Luciform body
- Lucis Trust
- Phosphorus, the morning star, aka Eosphorus and Heosphorus
- Shahar
- Shukra Vedic Planet Venus, teacher of the Asuras
