= Hesperus =

Planet Venus in the evening

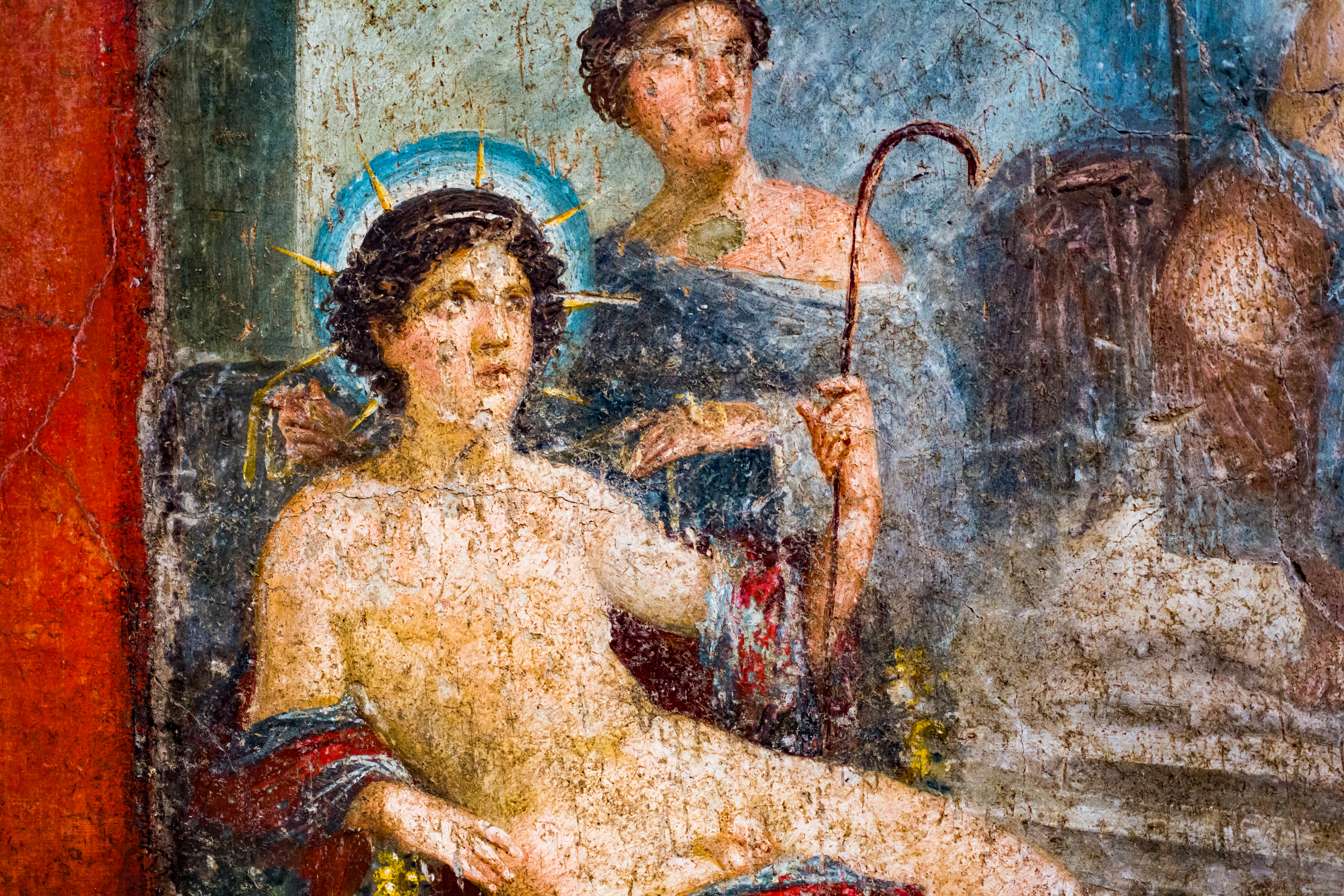
A wall painting in Pompeii, depicting a youth with a nimbus, who some scholars have identified as Hesperus. It dates to the reign of Vespasian (69–79 AD).

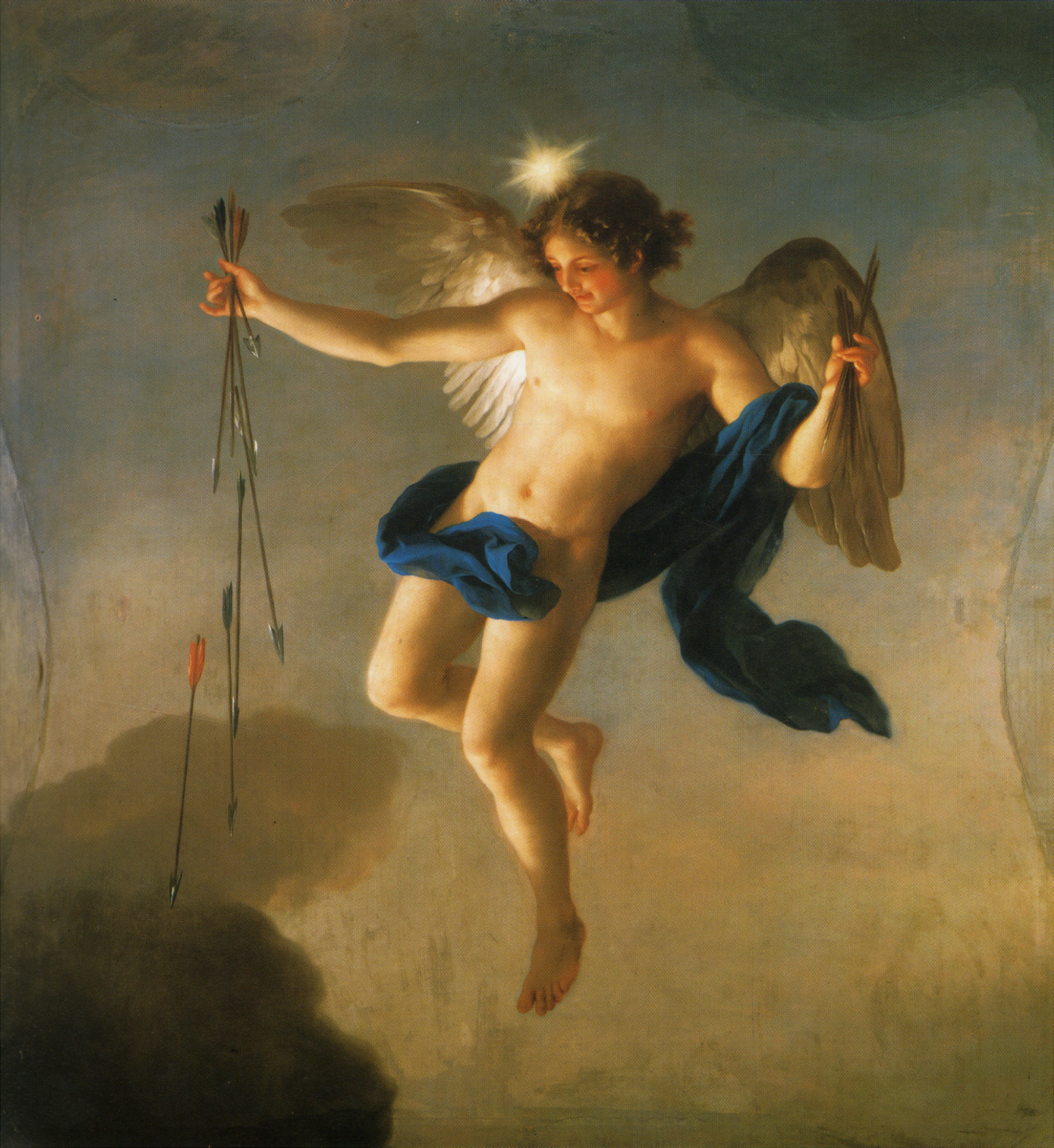
Hesperus as Personification of the Evening Star by Anton Raphael Mengs (1765).

In Greek mythology, Hesperus (/ˈhɛspərəs/; Ancient Greek: Ἕσπερος, lit. 'evening') is the Evening Star, the planet Venus in the evening. A son of the dawn goddess Eos (Roman Aurora), he is the half-brother of her other son, Phosphorus (also called Eosphorus; the "Morning Star"). Hesperus' Roman equivalent is Vesper (cf. "evening", "supper", "evening star", "west").

By one account, Hesperus' father was the mortal Cephalus, while Phosphorus' father was the star god Astraeus. Other sources, however, state that Hesperus was the brother of Atlas, and thus the son of Iapetus.

== Variant names ==
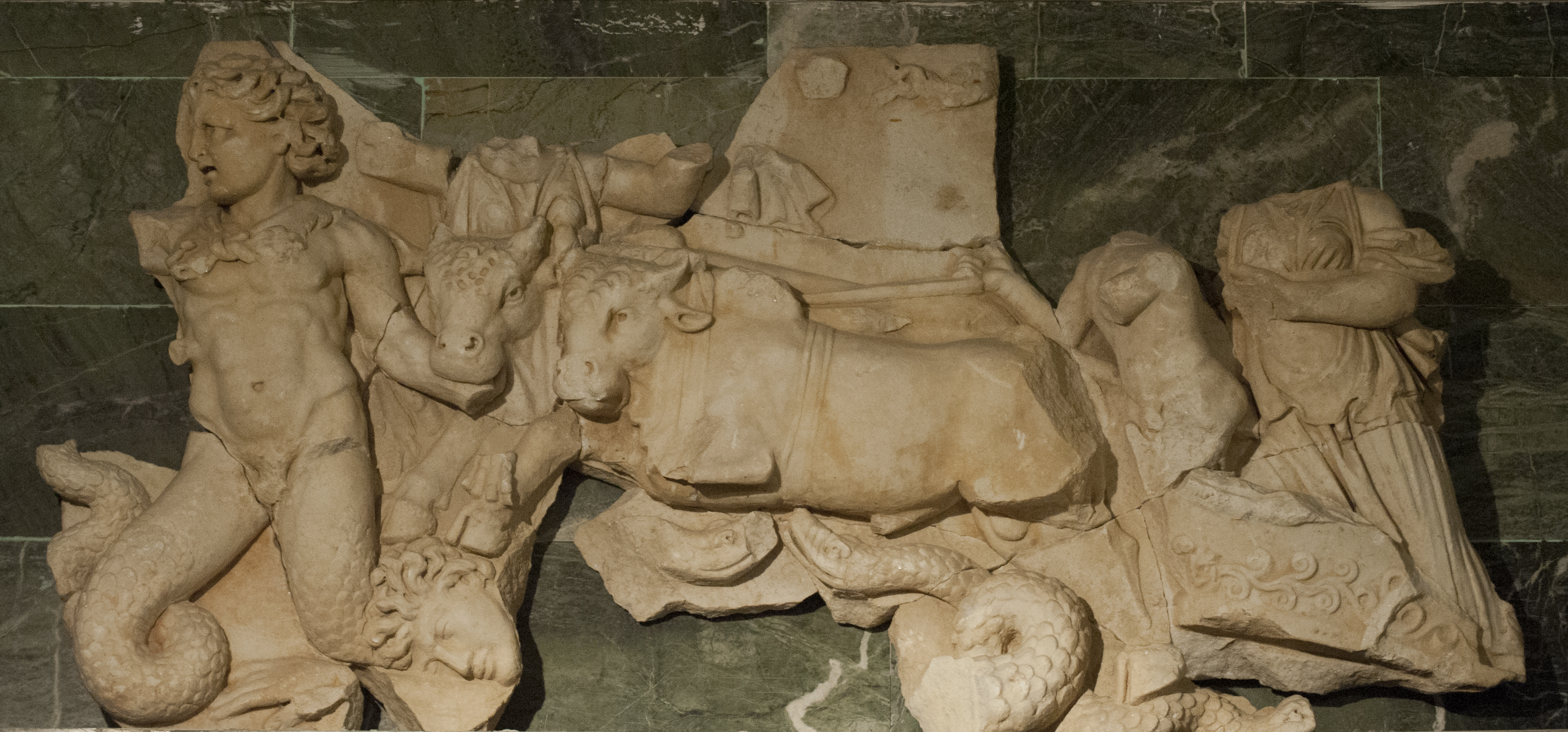
Selene, Hesperus and Nyx fight against the Giants, Antalya Museum.

Hesperus is the personification of the "evening star", the planet Venus in the evening. His name is sometimes conflated with the names for his brother, the personification of the planet as the "morning star" Eosphorus (Greek Ἐωσφόρος, "bearer of dawn") or Phosphorus (Ancient Greek: Φωσφόρος, "bearer of light", often translated as "Lucifer" in Latin), since they are all personifications of the same planet Venus. "Heosphoros" in the Greek Septuagint and "Lucifer" in Jerome's Latin Vulgate were used to translate the Hebrew "Helel" (Venus as the brilliant, bright or shining one), "son of Shahar (Dawn)" in the Hebrew version of Isaiah 14:12.

Eosphorus/Hesperus was said to be the father of Ceyx and Daedalion. In some sources, he is also said to be the father of the Hesperides.

Maurus Servius Honoratus, in his commentaries on Virgil's Eclogues, mentions that Hesperus inhabited Mount Oeta in Thessaly and that there he had loved the young Hymenaeus, who sang at the wedding of Dionysus and Ariadne. Servius makes no distinction between the Evening Star and the Morning Star, calling them both Hesperus and the Lucifer of Ida.

== "Hesperus is Phosphorus" ==
In the philosophy of language, "Hesperus is Phosphorus" is a famous sentence in relation to the semantics of proper names. Gottlob Frege used the terms "the evening star" (der Abendstern) and "the morning star" (der Morgenstern) to illustrate his distinction between sense and reference, and subsequent philosophers changed the example to "Hesperus is Phosphorus" so that it utilized proper names. Saul Kripke used the sentence to posit that the knowledge of something necessary (in this case the identity of Hesperus and Phosphorus) could be empirical rather than knowable a priori.

== See also ==
- Aurvandill, a figure in German mythology also known as Earendel
- Hesperides
- Lucifer, the Latin name for the Morning Star
- "The Wreck of the Hesperus", a poem by Henry Wadsworth Longfellow
- Aspect of Venus
