= Philonis =

In Greek mythology Philonis (Ancient Greek: Φιλωνίς) was an Attican daughter of Daedalion or of Eosphoros and Cleoboea, from Thoricus. In some accounts, King Deion of Phocus was also called the father of Philonis making her one of the Aeolids, her mother was probably Diomede, daughter of Xuthus. She was the mother of Philammon and Autolycus by Apollo and Hermes, respectively. In some accounts, the mother of Philammon was called Chione, Leuconoe, or Telauge.
