= The Death of Chione =

Painting by Nicolas Poussin

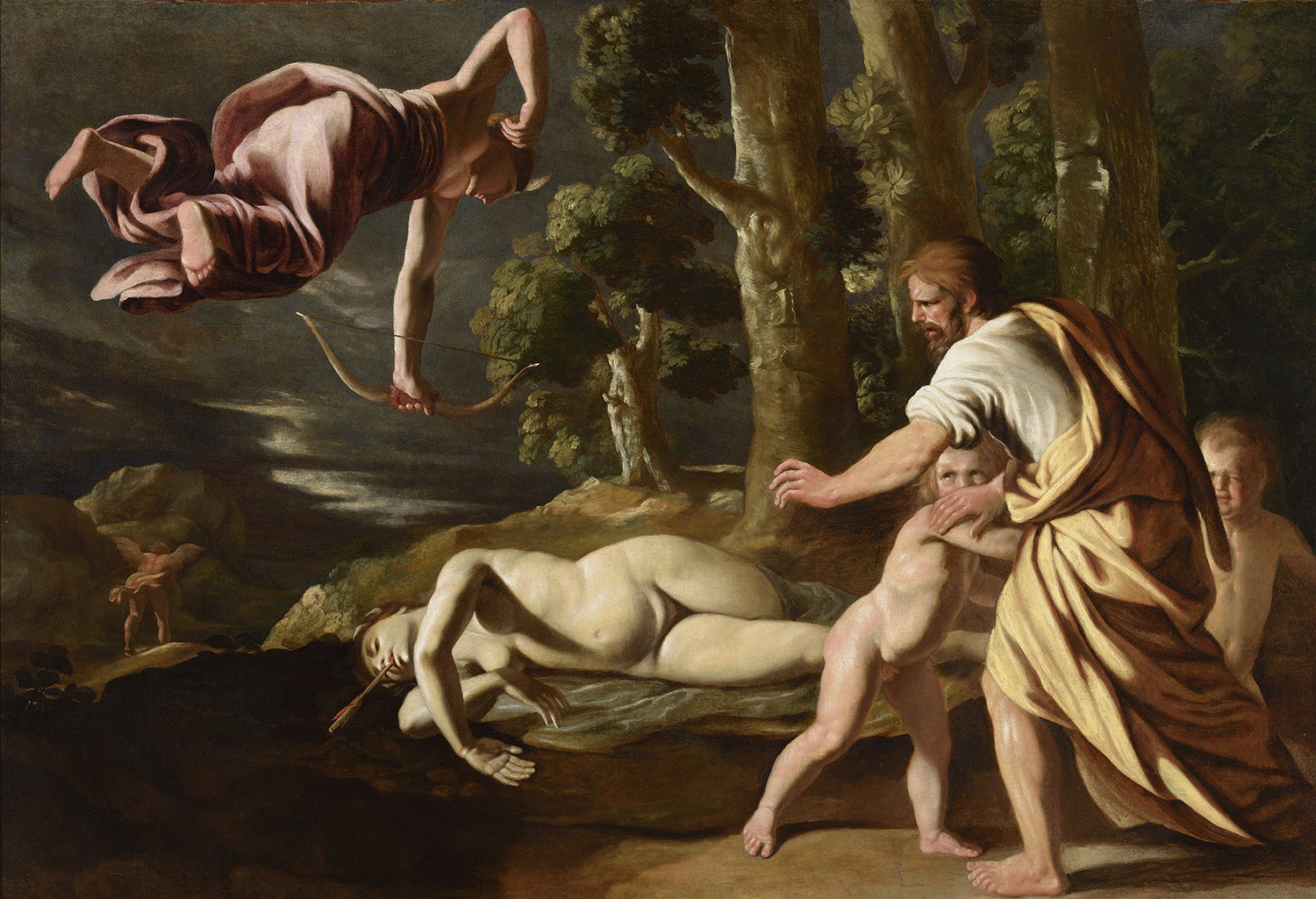
The Death of Chione (1622) by Nicolas Poussin

The Death of Chione is an oil-on-canvas painting executed in 1622 by the French artist Nicolas Poussin, his first known surviving work. He produced it during a stay in Lyon and in February 2016 it was acquired by that city's Museum of Fine Arts.

== Subject ==
The painting is based on a Greek myth about Chione. Chione, the daughter of king Daedalion, attracted the attention of both Hermes and Apollo. Eventually, she became pregnant with twins, one with Hermes and the other with Apollo. She boasted about her beauty and compared it to that of Goddesses Artemis and Athena. Artemis was angered, and she struck Chione down with an arrow through her tongue. This myth teaches that pride, arrogance, and challenging the Gods leads to disastrous consequences.

The painting shows the scene after Chione has been killed; including the emotional reactions of the characters. The placement of figures in the painting has structure and balance, with a central focus of a lifeless Chione. The lighting in the painting creates an emphasis on Chione, and adds contrast to the dark background. The painting shows it has a classical influence, for example, the sculptured characters and the scene in the forest.

Poussin was influenced by classical antiquity and some renaissance ideologies. He often created paintings with themes of mythology, religion, and history. Also, he was an important leader in the French Baroque movement.

== See also ==
- List of paintings by Nicolas Poussin
