= Philammon =

Musician in Greek mythology

In Greek mythology, Philammon (Ancient Greek: Φιλάμμων) was an excellent musician, a talent he received from his father, Apollo.

== Family ==
Philammon's mother was either Chione (or Philonis), daughter of Daedalion, or Leuconoe, daughter of Eosphoros, or Chrysothemis, daughter of Carmanor of Crete. By Argiope, a nymph of Mount Parnassos, he had Thamyris.

== Mythology ==
Philammon was unnaturally beautiful and thus, one of the nymphs (Argiope) seduced the youth and became pregnant. But Philammon refused to take her into his house as his wife and for being ashamed of the pregnancy, the girl left the Peloponnese and came to the Akte (shore) where she gave birth to a boy, Thamyris.

Philammon was said to have established the tradition of the hymns celebrating the births of Artemis and Apollo, written by himself, being performed by choruses of girls at Delphi. He was the second winner of the most ancient singing contest at Delphi, after Chrysothemis and before his son Thamyris. Some ascribe to him the foundation of the Lernaean mysteries. He was also reported to have been among the Argonauts.
