= Chione (daughter of Daedalion) =

Woman in Greek mythology

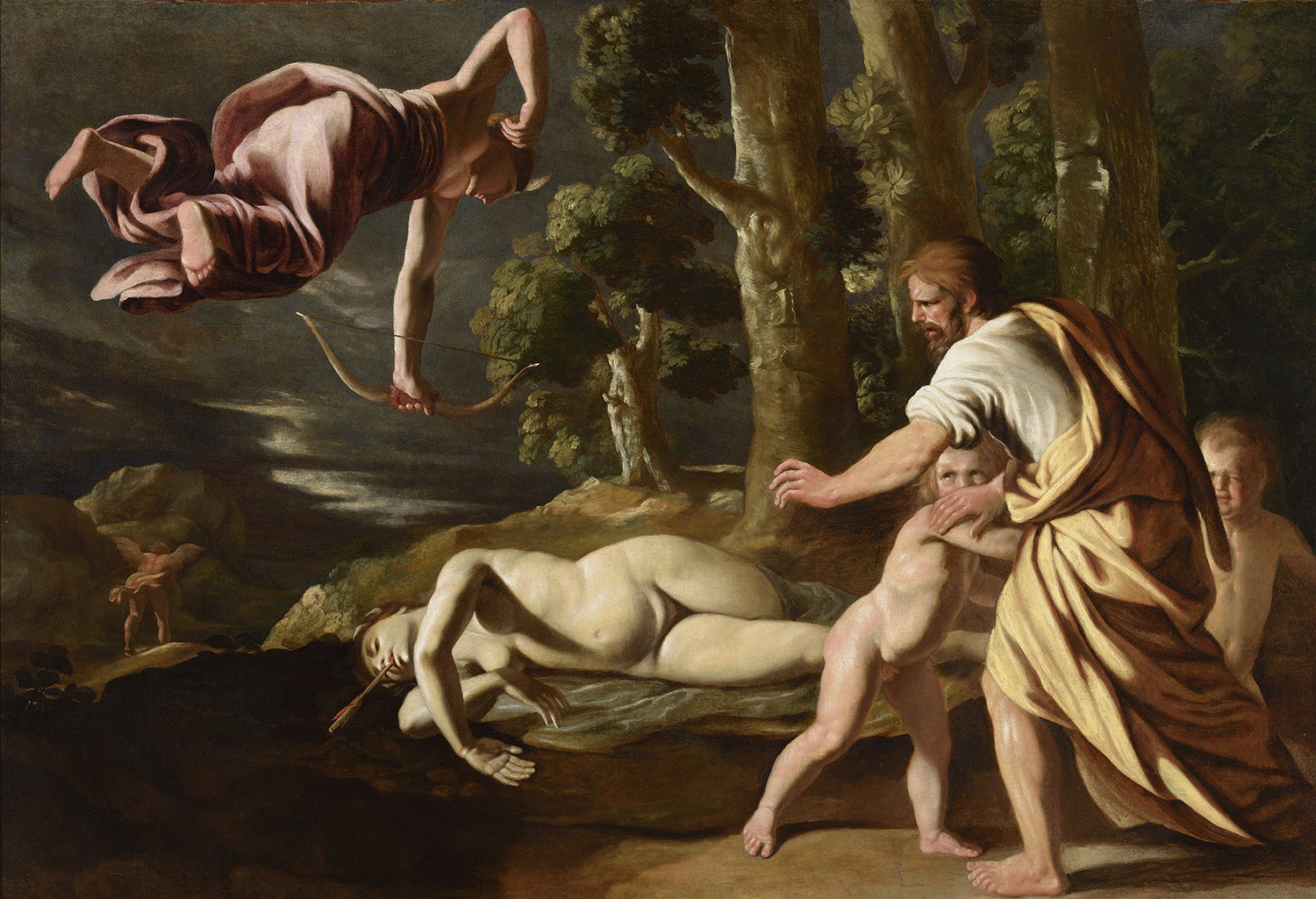
The Death of Chione by Nicolas Poussin, 1622.

In ancient Greek and Roman mythology, Chione (/kaɪˈoʊniː/; Ancient Greek: Χιόνη, romanized: Khiónē, lit. 'snowy'), also known in some authors as Philonis (Ancient Greek: Φιλωνίς, romanized: Philōnís), is the pretty daughter of Daedalion, who was desired by many, among them the Olympian gods Apollo and Hermes both. She bore each god a son, Philammon and Autolycus respectively. The beautiful Chione died when she gravely insulted Artemis, goddess of the hunt, who slew her with her arrows.

== Etymology ==
The girl's name Χιόνη is derived from the ancient Greek word for snow, χιών (chiṓn). This noun in turn in inherited from the Indo-European root *ǵʰéyōm, translating to 'snow,' and is cognate with other ancient Greek words such as χεῖμα (kheîma, also meaning snow) and χειμών (kheimṓn, meaning winter).

In classical antiquity Chione was a generic name used for prostitutes, which might reflect her role in myth. In other versions she is also called Philonis, Leuconoe and Telauge.

== Family ==
Chione was the daughter of Daedalion by an unnamed mother. In other accounts, this girl's name is Philonis, and her parents are variously given as Eosphoros and Cleoboea or Deion.

== Mythology ==
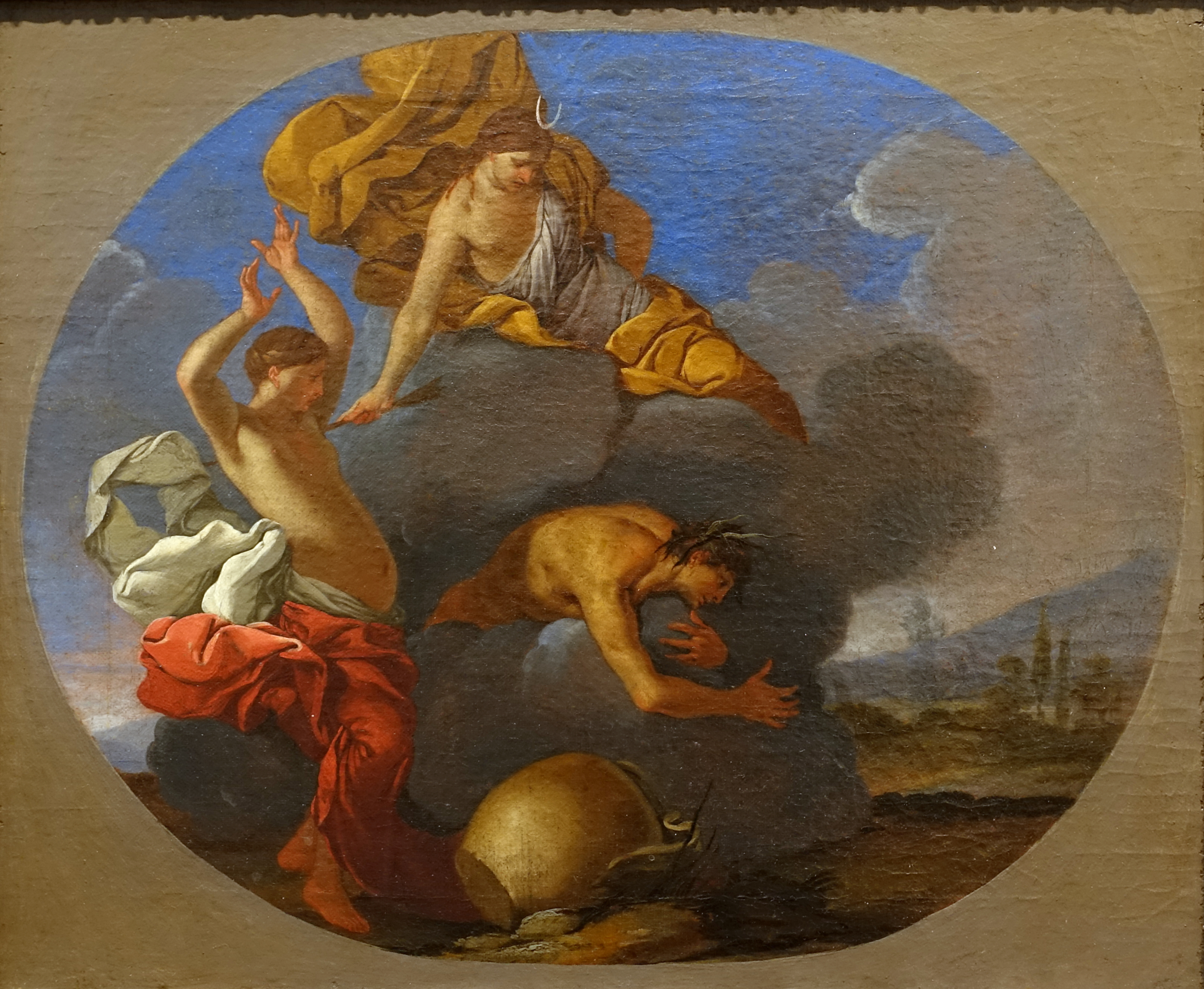
Artemis kills Chione, oil on canvas by Giulio Carpioni, 1660s, Blanton Museum of Art.

Chione was an excessively beautiful maiden who began attracting the attention of many mortal and divine males once she turned fourteen. Among her most ardent suitors were the gods Apollo and Hermes, who caught a glimpse of her at the same time when they were coming down from Delphi and Mount Cyllene respectively. They fell in love with her in an instant on account of her great beauty.

Hermes, who was impatient, immediately sent Chione into a deep sleep and raped her while she was unconscious. Apollo on the other hand waited until dusk and consorted with her after he gained access to her chambers by transforming himself into an old woman. Having lain with them on the same day, Chione bore them twin sons; Autolycus, who was crafty and deceitful, to Hermes, and Philammon, a talented singer and musician, to Apollo.

Chione's unrestrained arrogance and hubris proved to be her undoing, for eventually she spoke in a haughty manner against Artemis and dared compare her beauty to that of the goddess. Artemis would have none of that, so she pierced the maiden's tongue with her arrows, and Chione perished in agony and blood. Her father Daedalion was extremely distraught by Chione's death, and attempted to join her in her funeral pyre, but was restrained. In the end he threw himself off a cliff, but Apollo felt pity for him and turned him into a hawk.

== In culture ==
Older authors such as Hesiod and Pherecydes make Philonis the mother of Autolycus and Philammon, with 'Chione' first appearing in Ovid, while in Homer's Odyssey Autolycus is decisively not the son of Hermes. Although the story of Autolycus and Philammon's birth has precedent, the name and metamorphosis of the maiden's father does not, and it is not clear why Ovid introduced him, although he might have drawn influence from Nicander. It is also likely that Daedalion and Chione's story originated from Boios, an earlier Greek writer and author of the Ornithogonia ("birth of the birds"), from whom Ovid inherited many elements and narratives he evoked multiple times in his writing.

Chione/Philonis is a rare example of a mortal girl who has more than one divine lover. At Thorikos, Philonis received offerings during the month of Mounichion, and due to the meteorological or astronomical meanings of the various names assigned to the girl and her father, it is possible that those stories were connected one way or another to weather and seasonal cults at Thorikos.

Scholar Graham Anderson suggested that the German fairytale of Snow White has ancient roots in the myth of Chione; Chione means 'snowy', she is described as the most beautiful woman of the land, she is put to sleep through supernatural means by Hermes, whereas Apollo manages to approach her by taking the form of an old crone.

== See also ==
Other tales of hubris in Greek mythology:

- Cassiopeia, who boasted that her daughter was prettier than the Nereids
- Arachne, who bragged that she was a better seamstress than Athena
- Niobe, who claimed she was a better mother than Leto for having more children
- Antigone, who compared herself to Hera

== Bibliography ==
- Anderson, Graham (2000). Fairytale in the Ancient World. Routledge. ISBN 978-0-415-23702-4.
- Avery, Catherine B., ed. (1962). New Century Classical Handbook. New York: Appleton-Century-Crofts.
- Beekes, Robert S. P. (2010). Lucien van Beek (ed.). Etymological Dictionary of Greek. Leiden Indo-European Etymological Dictionary Series. Vol. II. Leiden, the Netherlands: Brill Publications. ISBN 978-90-04-17418-4. ISSN 1574-3586.
- Bell, Robert E. (1991). Women of Classical Mythology: A Biographical Dictionary. ABC-Clio. ISBN 9780874365818.
- Conon, Fifty Narrations, surviving as one-paragraph summaries in the Bibliotheca (Library) of Photius, Patriarch of Constantinople translated from the Greek by Brady Kiesling. Online version at the Topos Text Project.
- Forbes Irving, Paul M. C. (1990). Metamorphosis in Greek Myths. Clarendon Press. ISBN 0-19-814730-9.
- Fowler, Robert L. (2000). Early Greek Mythography. Vol. 2: Commentary. Oxford, UK: Oxford University Press. ISBN 978-0-19-814741-1.
- Gantz, Timothy (1993). Early Greek Myth: A Guide to Literary and Artistic Sources. Vol. 1. Johns Hopkins University Press. ISBN 978-0-8018-5360-9.
- Grant, Michael; Hazel, John (August 2, 2004). Who's Who in Classical Mythology. London and New York: Routledge. ISBN 0-415-26041-8.
- Grimal, Pierre (1987). The Dictionary of Classical Mythology. Wiley-Blackwell. ISBN 0-631-13209-0.
- Hard, Robin (2004). The Routledge Handbook of Greek Mythology: Based on H.J. Rose's "Handbook of Greek Mythology". Routledge. ISBN 9780415186360.
- Hyginus, Fabulae from The Myths of Hyginus translated and edited by Mary Grant. University of Kansas Publications in Humanistic Studies. Online version at the Topos Text Project.
- Kearns, Emily (October 1, 2006). "Chione". In Cancik, Hubert; Schneider, Helmuth (eds.). Brill's New Pauly. Translated by Christine F. Salazar. Oxford: Brill Reference Online. doi:10.1163/1574-9347_bnp_e232630. ISSN 1574-9347.
- Liddell, Henry George; Scott, Robert (1940). Stuart Jones, Sir Henry; McKenzie, Roderick (eds.). A Greek-English Lexicon. Oxford, UK: Clarendon Press.
- March, Jennifer R. (May 31, 2014). Dictionary of Classical Mythology. Oxbow Books. ISBN 978-1-78297-635-6.
- Merkelbach, R.; West, M. L. (1967). Fragmenta Hesiodea. Oxford: Clarendon Press. ISBN 978-0-198-14171-6.
- Myers, K. Sara (1994). Ovid's Causes: Cosmogony and Aetiology in the Metamorphoses. MI, United States: University of Michigan Press. ISBN 0-472-10459-4.
- Ovid, Metamorphoses, with an English prose translation by A. S. Kline, 2000. Text available online at Poetry in Translation.
- Roman, Luke; Roman, Monica (2010). Encyclopedia of Greek and Roman Mythology. Infobase Publishing. ISBN 9781438126395.
- Smith, William (1873). A Dictionary of Greek and Roman Biography and Mythology. London, UK: John Murray, printed by Spottiswoode and Co. Online version at the Perseus.tufts library.
- Tripp, Edward (June 1970). Crowell's Handbook of Classical Mythology (1st ed.). Thomas Y. Crowell Co. ISBN 069022608X.
