= Aspects of Venus =

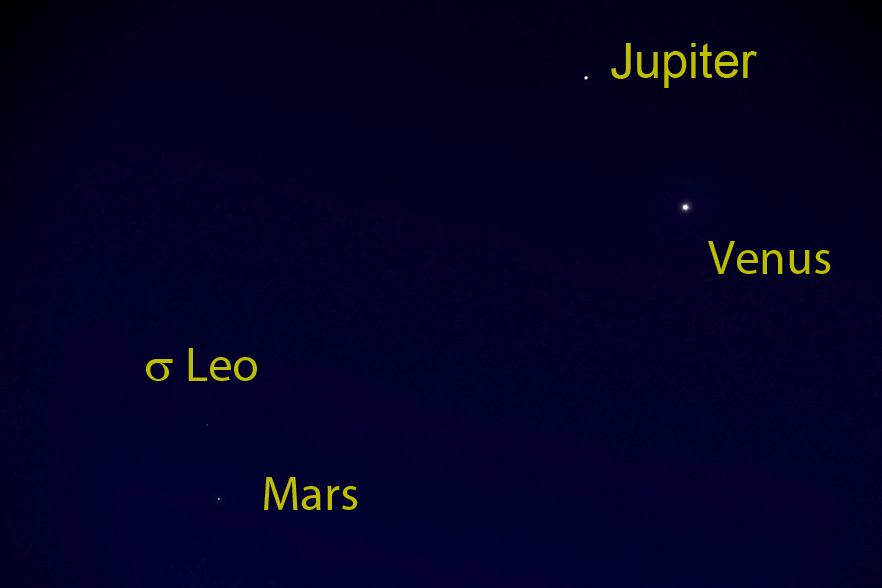
Venus on 26 October 2015 at her greatest western elongation in the constellation Leo close to Jupiter and Mars. Magnitudes: Venus: -4,5 mag, Jupiter: -1,8 mag, Mars: +1,8 mag, Leo: +4,1 mag

In astrology, an aspect is an angle a planet makes to another planet or point of astrological interest. As the second-brightest object in the night sky after the Moon, often prominent during the morning or evening, Venus has aspects that are readily apparent to the casual eye. They were of historical importance in the development of geocentric and ultimately heliocentric models of the Solar System.

== Aspects of the planet Venus ==
The table contains special positions of Venus until 2021. In general, Venus (or Mercury) is an "evening star" when it has an eastern elongation from the Sun, and is a "morning star" when it has a western elongation.

Greatest eastern elongation	Greatest brilliancy	Stationary, then retrograde	Inferior conjunction	Stationary, then prograde	Greatest brilliancy	Greatest western elongation	Superior conjunction
March 29, 2004 - 46°	May 3, 2004	May 18, 2004	June 8, 2004	June 29, 2004	July 13, 2004	August 17, 2004 - 45.8°	March 31, 2005
November 3, 2005 - 47.1°	December 12, 2005	December 23, 2005	January 13, 2006	February 3, 2006	February 17, 2006	March 25, 2006 - 46.5°	October 27, 2006
June 9, 2007 - 45.4°	July 14, 2007	July 25, 2007	August 18, 2007	September 7, 2007	September 23, 2007	October 28, 2007 - 46.5°	June 9, 2008
January 14, 2009 - 47.1°	February 20, 2009	March 5, 2009	March 27, 2009	April 15, 2009	April 29, 2009	June 5, 2009 - 45.9°	January 11, 2010
August 20, 2010 - 46°	September 27, 2010	October 7, 2010	October 29, 2010	November 16, 2010	December 2, 2010	January 8, 2011 - 47°	August 16, 2011
March 27, 2012 - 46°	April 30, 2012	May 15, 2012	June 6, 2012	June 27, 2012	July 10, 2012	August 15, 2012 - 45.8°	March 28, 2013
November 1, 2013 - 47.1°	December 10, 2013	December 20, 2013	January 11, 2014	January 31, 2014	February 11, 2014	March 22, 2014 - 46.6°	October 25, 2014
June 6, 2015 - 45.4°	July 12, 2015	July 23, 2015	August 15, 2015	September 5, 2015	September 20, 2015	October 26, 2015 - 46.4°	June 6, 2016
January 12, 2017 - 47.1°	February 18, 2017	March 2, 2017	March 25, 2017	April 12, 2017	April 26, 2017	June 3, 2017 - 45.9°	January 9, 2018
August 17, 2018 - 45.9°	September 25, 2018	October 5, 2018	October 26, 2018	November 24, 2018	November 30, 2018	January 6, 2019 - 47°	August 14, 2019
March 24, 2020 - 46.1°	April 28, 2020	May 13, 2020	June 3, 2020	June 24, 2020	July 8, 2020	August 13, 2020 - 45.8°	March 26, 2021

Note: Greatest brilliancy is often confused with "maximum brightness". Although they are related, they are not quite the same thing. The "greatest brilliancy" is really a geometric maximum: it occurs when the apparent area of the sunlit part of Venus is greatest. Only if the luminance of Venus' apparent surface would be constant (i.e. the same at every point and at every phase) would the "greatest brilliancy" of Venus coincide with its maximum brightness. However, the reflection of sunlight on Venus more closely follows Lambert's law, which means that the maximum brightness occurs at a somewhat larger phase of Venus than its greatest brilliancy.

== See also ==
- Ashen light
- Hesperus (evening star), the planet Venus
- Phosphorus (morning star), the planet Venus
- Planetary conjunction
- Retrograde motion
- Transit of Venus

== Bibliography ==
- U.S. Naval Observatory. Multiyear Interactive Computer Almanac, 1800–2050.
