= Leuconoe =

Name of several Greek mythological figures

In Greek mythology, the name Leuconoe (/ljuːˈkɒnoʊi/ or /leu̯konóɛː/; Ancient Greek: Λευκονόη) may refer to:

- Leuconoe, one of the Minyads, more commonly known as Leucippe.
- Leuconoe, daughter of Lucifer (Eosphorus) and mother of Philammon by Apollo. In some accounts, the mother of Philammon was called Chione or Philonis.
- In some editions of Hyginus' Fabulae, Leuconoe was the suggested reading for the name of the child of Poseidon and Themisto. The reading Leucon has been accepted as more appropriate.

In Roman literature, Leuconoe is a figure to whom Horace's Ode 11 of Book 1 of Odes is addressed.
