= Shahar (god) =

Canaanite dawn deity

- God of dawn

Genealogy
- Parents: El (father) Asherah (mother)
- Siblings: Shalim

Shahar ("dawn") is a god in Ugaritic and Canaanite religion first mentioned in inscriptions found in Ugarit (now Ras Shamra, Syria).

William F. Albright identified Shalim as the god of the dusk and Shahar as the god of the dawn.

Shahar and Salim are the twin children of El. As the markers of dawn and dusk, Shahar and Shalim also represented the temporal structure of the day.

The names Shahar and Shalim are masculine (although Shahar in modern Hebrew is a unisex name), and it appears the gods are as well.

== Name ==
=== Hebrew ===
Sutton recently says the word שחר is used 43 times in the Tanakh. These include 23 as a noun (dawn, tomorrow, the morning star) 6 adjectivally (black) 12 as a piʿel verb ("to seek, to desire") or qal ("to become black" or "to be intent on"). "This indicates that within the etymology of שחר in the Hebrew Bible it is primarily used as a primary noun (sometimes) descriptive of the god or goddess Shachar."

=== Arabic ===
In Arabic, the word saḥar (سحر) refers to the predawn period and comes from the same Semitic root. This root is also visible in suḥūr (سحور), the predawn meal Muslims eat during Ramadan.

=== Etymology ===
Hebrew šaḥar is a primary noun. The Akkadian šēru(m) II and the dialectal Assyrian form šiāru(m), meaning ‘morning,’ argue against a verbal derivation since the substantival form pirâs only generates primary nouns. Furthermore, Old South Arabian śaḥar, which means "dawn, daybreak", does not suggest a causative form. Variations found in Qumran include Middle Hebrew šaḥar (1QH4:6: kšḥr, 'like the dawn'; 11QPsa 26:11: establishment of the dawn [kwn hiphil]; 4Q487 36,1 lšḥr, uncertain); Jewish Aramaic šaḥarā, 'morning dawn, early morning'; Moabite (feminine) šḥrt, compare mbqʽ hšḥrt, 'from daybreak'; Ugaritic šḥr, 'dawn, daybreak', and šḥr par. qdm, 'east wind'; šḥr ʽlmt, 'from this morning to eternity'; as well as the twin gods šḥr wšlm, 'morning and evening star', and ʽm šḥr wšlm šmmh, 'to šḥr and šlm in heaven'; Arabic saḥar, 'time before daybreak, early morning, dawn'. The ancient Arabic god Saḥar, 'dawn, daybreak', is depicted in reliefs with the symbol of the dragon's head.

=== Theophorics ===
The form šaḥar also appears as a divine name in personal names, including Ugaritic ìlšḥr "šḥr is (my) god"; Phoenician ʽbdšḥr, šḥrbʽl, Hebrew אחישחר ("brother of Shahar") and שחריה ("Yahweh is Shahar.")

== Sources ==
=== Tanakh ===
"Traces" of the deity can be found in the canon; HALOT 9524 names Isaiah 14:12, Psalm 139:9, Job 3:9 and 41:10.

==== Isaiah 14:12–15 ====
Isaiah 14:12–15 has been the origin of the belief that Satan was a fallen angel, who could also be referred to as Lucifer. It refers to the rise and disappearance of the morning star Venus in the phrase "O Shining One, son of Dawn!" (Hebrew: הֵילֵל בֶּן־שָׁחַר, romanized: Hēlēl ben Shāḥar, lit. 'exalted one, son of Shāḥar', translated as Lucifer in the Vulgate and preserved in the early English translations of the Bible.)

This understanding of Isaiah 14:12–15 seems to be the most accepted interpretation in the New Testament, as well as among early Christians such as Origen, Eusebius, Tertullian, and Pope Gregory I. It may be considered a Christian "remythologization" of Isaiah 14, as the verse originally used Canaanite religion to build its imagery of the hubris of a historical ruler, "the king of Babylon" in Isaiah 14:4.

The role of Venus as the morning star was taken by ʿAṯtar, in this instance referred to as "son of Shāḥar". The reference to Shāḥar remains enigmatic to scholars, who have a wide range of theories on the mythological framework and sources for the passage in Isaiah.

=== Ugarit ===
==== KTU 1.23 ====
The conception and birth of Šaḥar-w-Šalim are found here. The story fits on one tablet without being cramped.

There is a short invocation of the gods. A mt w šr joins, and appears to harvest grapes with a "staff of widowhood." Pardee makes room for others' suggestions of circumcision imagery.

There's another invocation. Two women, apparently human worshipers, entice El. He seduces them, after a hunting ritual in which he roasts a bird he shot out of the air. In time they give birth to Šaḥar-w-Šalim, whom the goddess nurses. Hungry, they have their lips at the birds of the sky and fish of the sea.

==== RS 24.244 (KTU^{2} 1.100) Ugaritic liturgy against venomous reptiles ====
Message to Šaḥru-wa-Šalimu

She again calls to her mother Šapšu:

Mother Šapšu, take a message

to Šaḥru-wa-Šalimu in the heavens:20

My incantation for serpent bite,

for the scaly serpent's poison:

From it, O charmer, destroy,

from it cast out the venom.

Then he binds the serpent,

feeds the scaly serpent,

draws up a chair and sits.

== See also ==
- Phosphorus (morning star)
- Shamash
- Asherah
