= Daedalion =

Character of Greek mythology

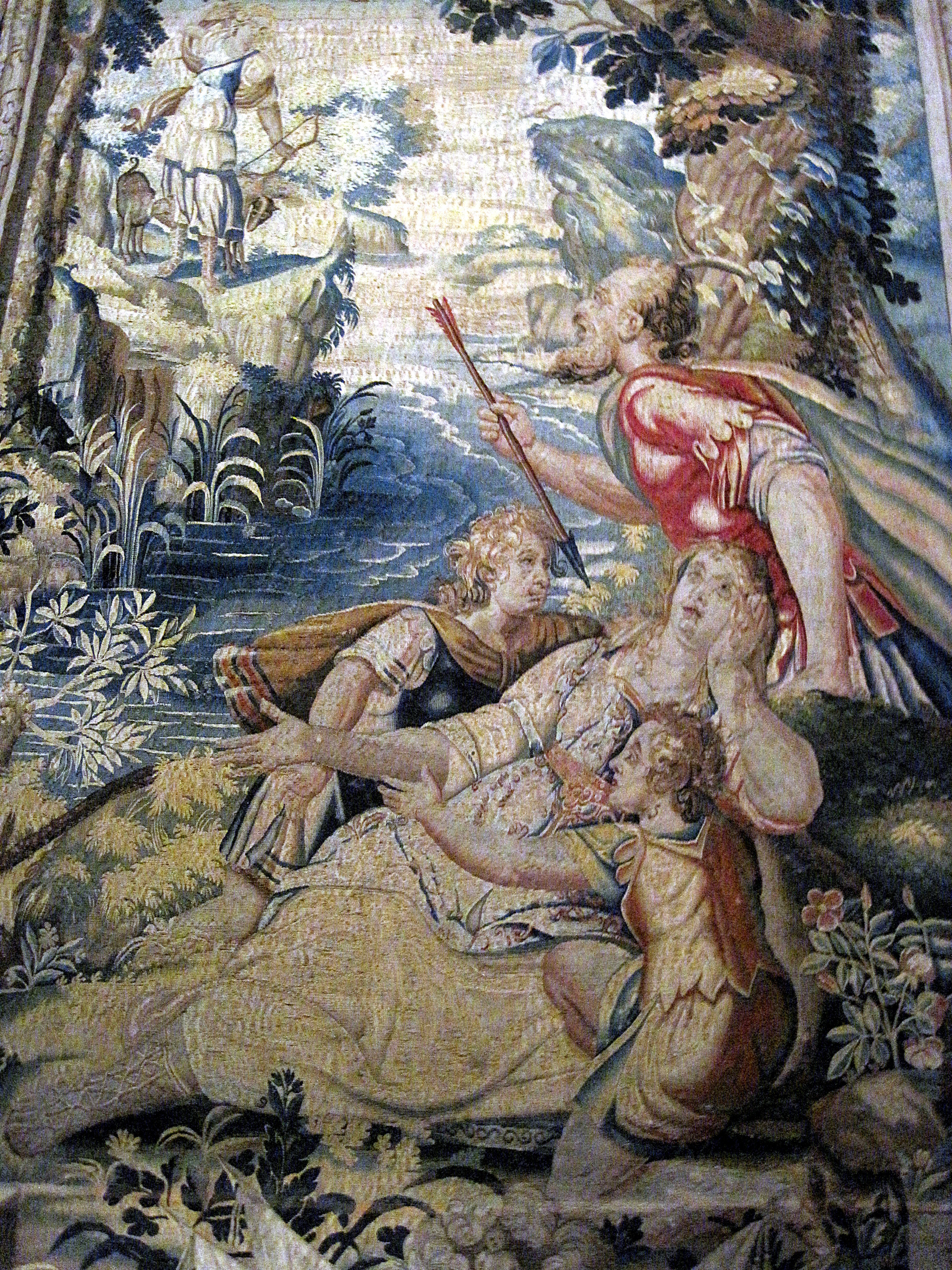
Chione killed with an arrow supported by her two sons

In Greek mythology, Daedalion or Daidalion (Ancient Greek: Δαιδαλίων, romanized: Daidalíon) was a son of Hesperos, the god of the Evening Star or Phosphorus, god of the Morning Star and the brother of Ceyx. Ceyx describes his brother Daedalion as a great warrior, full of courage and vigour but acknowledged that he could also be harsh, relishing the cruelty of war. The story of Daedalion's life is told mainly in Ovid's Metamorphoses though passing references can be found in other classical works. It is possible the story may have originated with Boios. In the tale Daedalion, grief-stricken following the death of his daughter Chione, attempts to cast himself off Mount Parnassus only to be transformed into a hawk by Apollo.

== Mythology ==
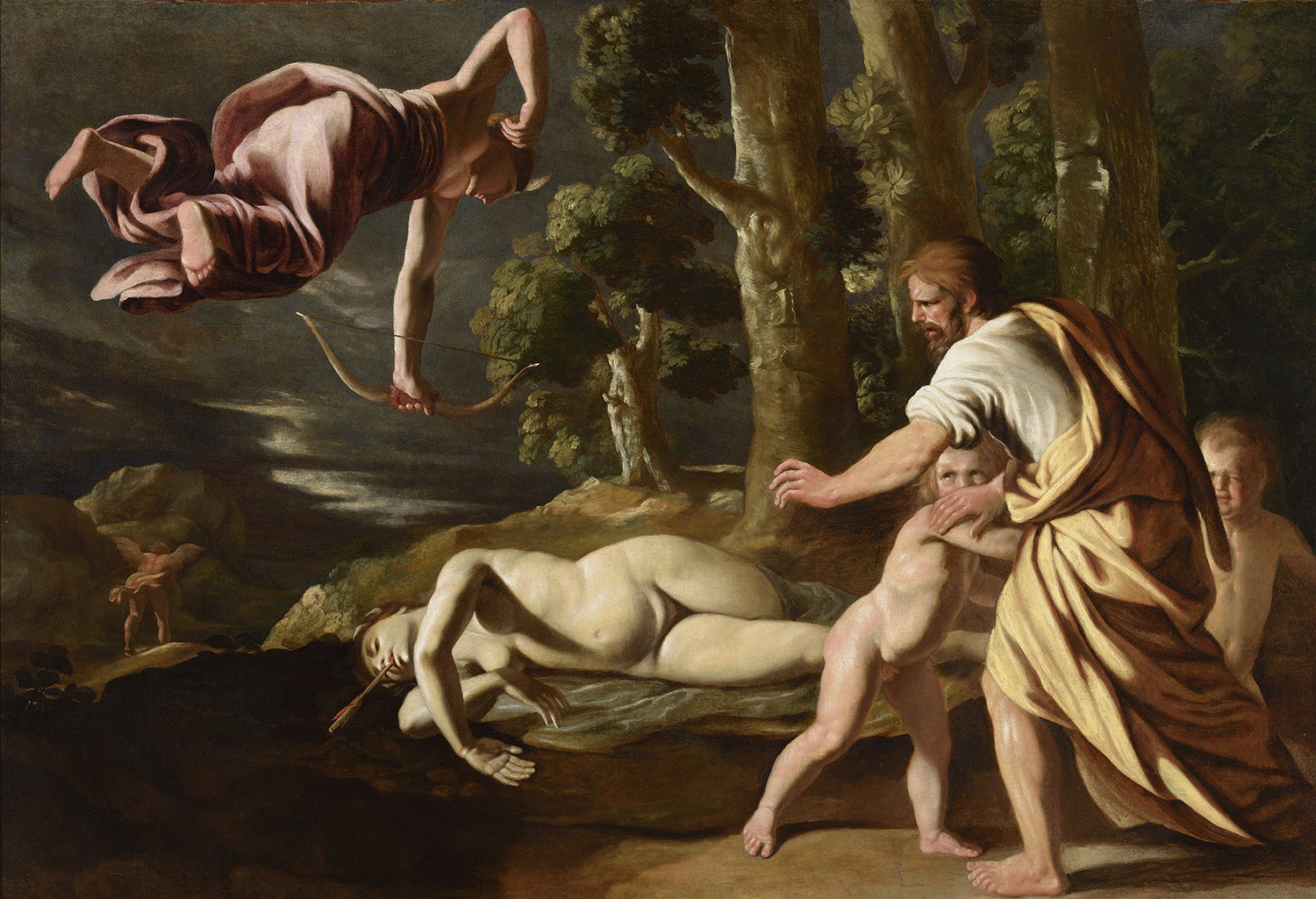
The Death of Chione by Nicolas Poussin, 1622

=== Beautiful daughter ===
Daedalion's daughter Chione was said to be so beautiful that she was the object of a thousand men's desire the moment she turned fourteen. As it transpired, Chione's admirers were not limited to mortal men. Whilst returning from visits to earth, both Apollo and Hermes caught sight of Chione and were filled with a burning lust. Apollo decided to wait until night fell; however, Hermes was not so patient. Through the use of magic, he caused Chione to fall into a deep sleep and proceeded to rape her. Later that evening, Apollo also visited her in the guise of an old woman. As a result of these two divine visitations Chione gave birth to twins. By Hermes she gave birth to Autolycus who grew into a notorious thief and charlatan. By Apollo she bore Philammon, a man famed both for his voice and skill with a lyre.

=== Death ===
The attentions of not one but two gods led Chione to boast that her beauty exceeded even that of Artemis. To avenge this personal slight, not to mention blasphemy, Artemis struck Chione down by shooting an arrow straight through her tongue. Her father, Daedalion, was overcome with grief despite his brother's best efforts to console him. At his daughter's funeral Daedalion tried to throw himself onto the pyre three times but was restrained. After a fourth unsuccessful attempt he ran, at an impossible speed, through the fields and the forests, climbed to the summit of Mount Parnassus and jumped. Apollo though took pity on the grieving father, transforming him into a hawk before he could hit the ground. It is said that the hawk's great strength, as well as its propensity for hunting other birds, is a result of Daedalion's former courage and the rage caused by the death of his daughter.

== See also ==
- Aesacus
- Alcyone
- Polyphonte
- Philomela
- Scylla (princess)
- Tereus
