= Phosphorus (morning star) =

Greek and Roman god of the Morning Star

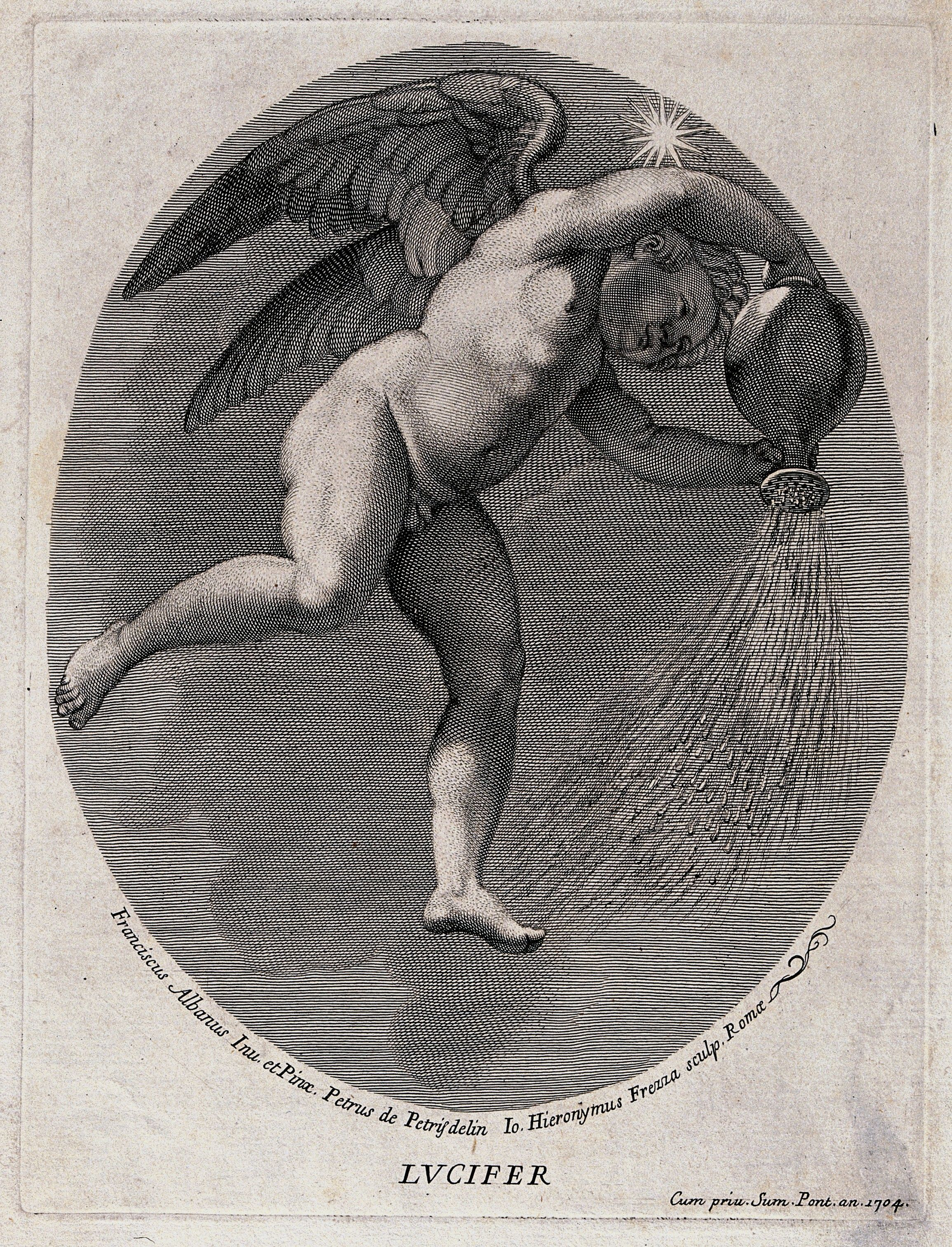
The morning star personified. Engraving by G.H. Frezza, 1704

Phosphorus (Ancient Greek: Φωσφόρος, romanized: Phōsphóros, lit. 'light-bringer') is the god of the planet Venus in its appearance as the Morning Star. Another Greek name for the Morning Star is "Eosphorus" (Ancient Greek: Ἑωσφόρος, romanized: Heōsphóros), which means "dawn-bringer". The term "eosphorus" is sometimes met in English. As an adjective, the word "phosphorus" is applied in the sense of "light-bringing" (for instance, the dawn, the god Dionysus, pine torches and the day) and "torch-bearing" as an epithet of several gods and goddesses, especially of Hecate but also of Artemis/Diana and Hephaestus. Seasonally, Venus is the "light bringer" in the northern hemisphere, appearing most brightly in December (an optical illusion due to shorter days), signalling the "rebirth" of longer days as winter wanes.

== Venus ==
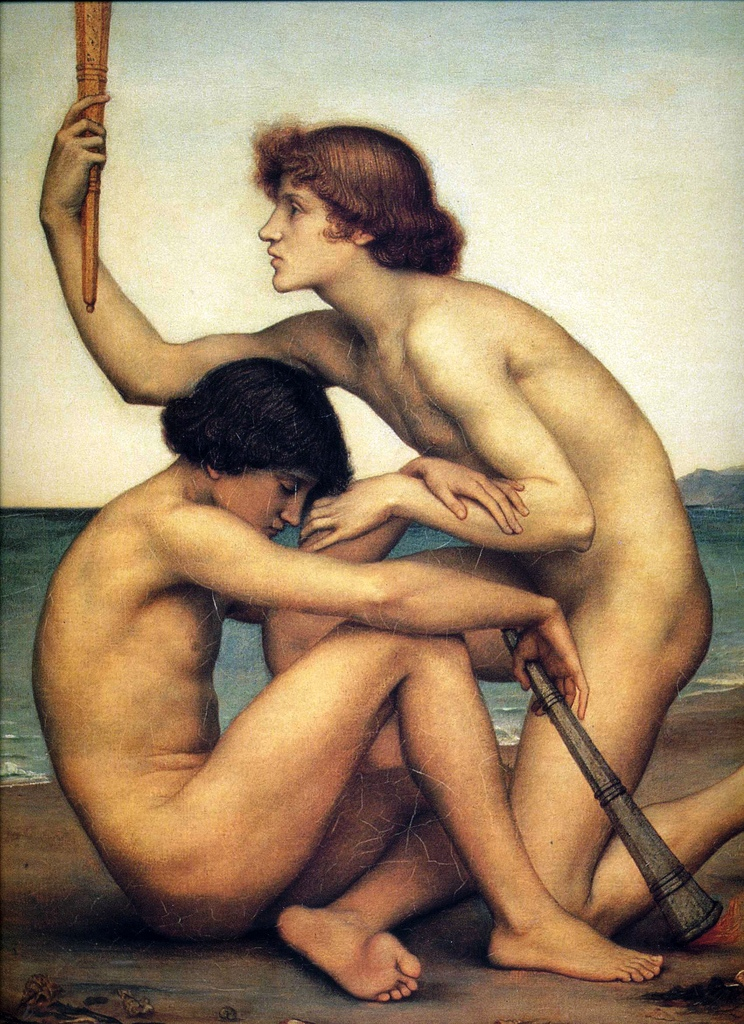
Evelyn De Morgan's Phosphorus and Hesperus, 1881

The morning star is an appearance of the planet Venus, an inferior planet, meaning that its orbit lies between the Earth and the Sun. Depending on the orbital locations of both Venus and Earth, it can be seen in the eastern morning sky for an hour or so before the Sun rises and dims it, or (as the evening star) in the western evening sky for an hour or so after the Sun sets, when Venus itself then sets. Venus is the brightest object in the sky after the Sun and the Moon, outshining the planets Jupiter and Saturn but, while these rise high in the sky, Venus never does. This may lie behind myths about deities associated with the morning star proudly striving for the highest place among the gods and being cast down.

== Mythology ==
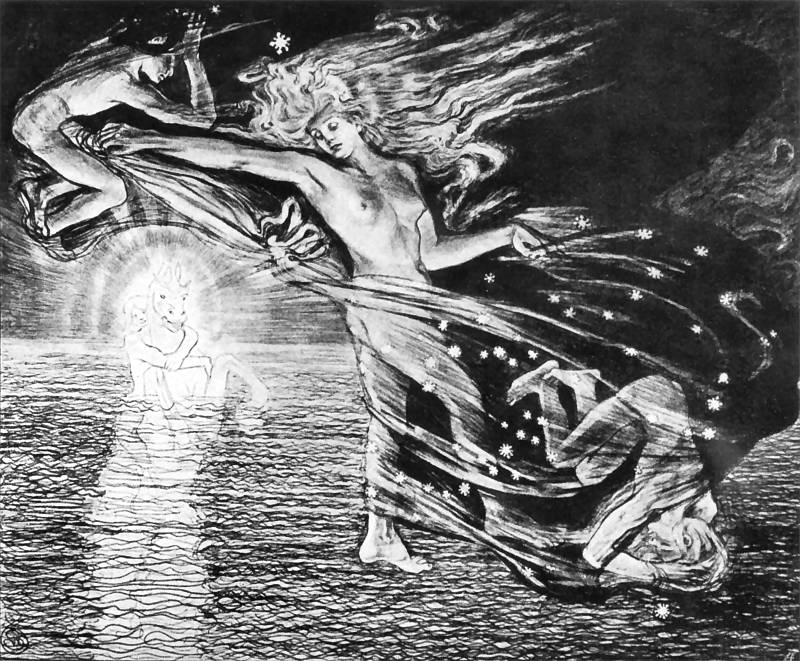
Stanisław Wyspiański: Phosphoros, Eos, Helios, Hesperos. Pencil drawing, The National Museum in Warsaw, 1897

In Greek mythology, Hesiod calls Phosphorus a son of Astraeus and Eos, but others say of Cephalus and Eos, or of Atlas.

The Latin poet Ovid, speaking of Phosphorus and Hesperus (the Evening Star, the evening appearance of the planet Venus) as identical, makes him the father of Daedalion. Ovid also makes him the father of Ceyx, while the Latin grammarian Servius makes him the father of the Hesperides or of Hesperis.

While at an early stage the Morning Star (called Phosphorus and other names) and the Evening Star (referred to by names such as Hesperus) were thought of as two celestial objects, the Greeks accepted that the two were the same, but they seem to have continued to treat the two mythological entities as distinct. Halbertal and Margalit interpret this as indicating that they did not identify the star with the god or gods of mythology "embodied" in the star.

== "Hesperus is Phosphorus" ==
In the philosophy of language, "Hesperus is Phosphorus" is a famous sentence in relation to the semantics of proper names. Gottlob Frege used the terms "the evening star" (der Abendstern) and "the morning star" (der Morgenstern) to illustrate his distinction between sense and reference, and subsequent philosophers changed the example to "Hesperus is Phosphorus" so that it utilized proper names. Saul Kripke used the sentence to posit that the knowledge of something necessary — in this case the identity of Hesperus and Phosphorus — could be discoverable rather than known a priori.

== Latin literature ==
The Latin word corresponding to Greek "Phosphorus" is "Lucifer". It is used in its astronomical sense both in prose and poetry. Poets sometimes personify the star, placing it in a mythological context.

== See also ==
- Hesperus
- Aspect of Venus
- At-Tariq
- Auseklis
- Earendel
- Barnumbirr
- Jesus
- Lucifer
- Red Horn
- Photine or Photini/Photina of Samarita
- Shahar (god)
- Sirius
  - Heliacal rising
- Star and crescent
- Tlāhuizcalpantecuhtli
- Worship of heavenly bodies
- Zorya
