= Graeae =

Three sisters in Greek myth

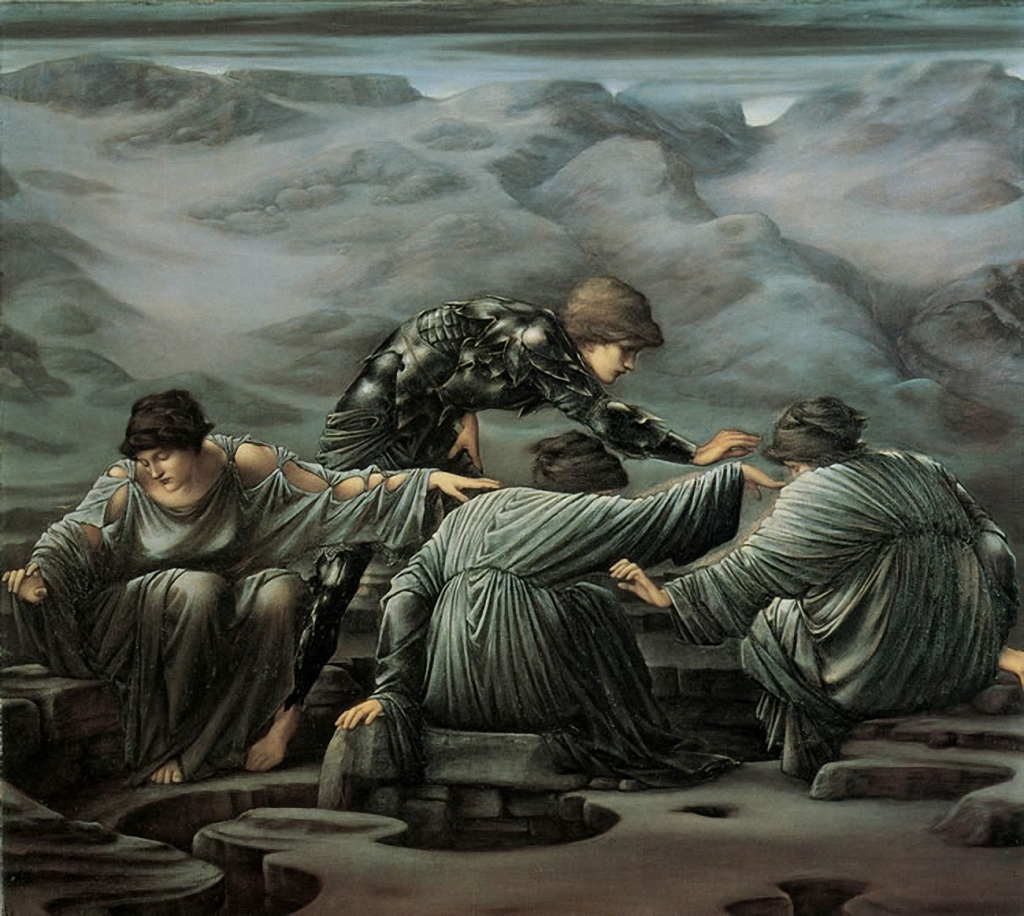
Perseus and the Graeae by Edward Burne-Jones (1892)

The Graeae (alternatively spelled Graiai; /ˈɡriːiː/; Ancient Greek: Γραῖαι Graiai, lit. 'old women',), also called the Grey Sisters and the Phorcides ('daughters of Phorcys'), were three sisters of Greek mythology who had gray hair from their birth and shared one eye and one tooth among them. They were the daughters of the primordial sea gods Phorcys and Ceto and sisters of, among others, the Gorgons. Their names were Deino (Δεινώ), Pemphredo (Πεμφρηδώ), and Enyo (Ἐνυώ; not to be confused with the war goddess, Enyo). They are best known from their encounter with Perseus, who, after capturing their eye, forced them to reveal information about the Gorgons.

== Etymology ==
The Greek Graiai is derived from the Proto-Indo-European root *ǵerh₂- *ǵreh_{2}-, "to grow old" via Proto-Greek: *gera-/grau-iu.

== Mythology ==
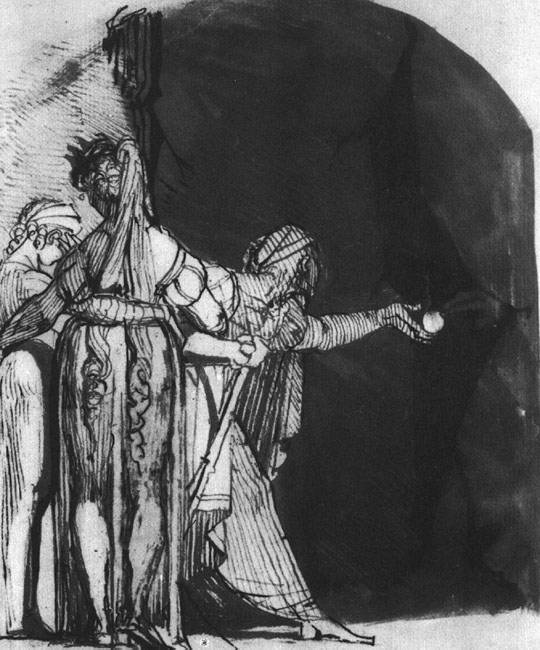
Perseus Returning the Eye of the Graiai by Henry Fuseli

The Graeae were daughters of the sea-deities Ceto and Phorcys (from which their name the Phorcydes derived) and sisters to the Gorgons. The Graeae took the form of old, grey-haired women. Their age was so great that a human childhood for them was hardly conceivable. In Theogony, however, Hesiod describes the Graeae as being "fair-cheeked". In Prometheus Bound, the Graeae are described as being "ancient maidens of swan-like aspect" (κυκνόμορφοι; perhaps here meaning "white-haired").

Hesiod names only two Graeae, the "well-clad" "Pemphredo" (Πεμφρηδώ "alarm") and the "saffron-robed" Enyo (Ἐνυώ), while Apollodorus lists Deino (Δεινώ "dread", the dreadful anticipation of horror) as a third. Calling them "Phorcides", Hyginus, in addition to Pemphredo and Enyo, adds Persis, noting that "for this last others say Dino".

They shared one eye and one tooth, which they took turns using. By stealing their eye while they were passing it among themselves, the hero Perseus forced them to tell the whereabouts of the three objects needed to kill Medusa (in other versions, the whereabouts of Medusa) by ransoming their shared eye for the information.

== Genealogy ==
Gaia
Pontus
Nereus	Thaumas	Phorcys	Ceto	Eurybia
Echidna	The Gorgons	The Graeae	Ladon	The Hesperides	Thoosa
Stheno	Deino
Euryale	Enyo
Medusa (Note: Most sources describe Medusa as the daughter of Phorcys and Ceto, though the author Hyginus (Fabulae Preface) makes Medusa the daughter of Gorgon and Ceto.)	Pemphredo

== Bibliography ==
- Aeschylus, (?), Prometheus Bound in Aeschylus: Persians. Seven against Thebes. Suppliants. Prometheus Bound. Edited and translated by Alan H. Sommerstein. Loeb Classical Library No. 145. Cambridge, Massachusetts: Harvard University Press, 2009. ISBN 978-0-674-99627-4. Online version at Harvard University Press.
- Aeschylus. Fragments. Edited and translated by Alan H. Sommerstein. Loeb Classical Library No. 505. Cambridge, Massachusetts: Harvard University Press, 2009. ISBN 978-0-674-99629-8. Online version at Harvard University Press
- Aeschylus, Persians. Seven against Thebes. Suppliants. Prometheus Bound. Edited and translated by Alan H. Sommerstein. Loeb Classical Library No. 145. Cambridge, Massachusetts: Harvard University Press, 2009. ISBN 978-0-674-99627-4. Online version at Harvard University Press
- Apollodorus, Apollodorus, The Library, with an English Translation by Sir James George Frazer, F.B.A., F.R.S. in 2 Volumes. Cambridge, Massachusetts, Harvard University Press; London, William Heinemann Ltd. 1921. Online version at the Perseus Digital Library.
- Grimal, Pierre, The Dictionary of Classical Mythology, Wiley-Blackwell, 1996, ISBN 978-0-631-20102-1. "Graeae" p. 175.
- Hesiod, Theogony, in The Homeric Hymns and Homerica with an English Translation by Hugh G. Evelyn-White, Cambridge, Massachusetts., Harvard University Press; London, William Heinemann Ltd. 1914. Online version at the Perseus Digital Library.
- Hyginus, Gaius Julius, The Myths of Hyginus. Edited and translated by Mary A. Grant, Lawrence: University of Kansas Press, 1960.
- Smith, William; Dictionary of Greek and Roman Biography and Mythology, London (1873). "Graeae"
- Roman, Luke; Roman, Monica (2010). Encyclopedia of Greek and Roman Mythology. Infobase Publishing. ISBN 978-1-4381-2639-5.
