= Greek water deities =

Characters of Greek mythology

The ancient Greeks had numerous water deities. The philosopher Plato once remarked that the Greek people were like frogs sitting around a pond—their many cities hugging close to the Mediterranean coastline from the Hellenic homeland to Asia Minor, Libya, Sicily, and southern Italy. Thus, they venerated a rich variety of water divinities. The range of Greek water deities of the classical era range from primordial powers and an Olympian on the one hand, to heroized mortals, chthonic nymphs, trickster-figures, and monsters on the other.

== Types ==
=== Primordial powers ===
Oceanus and Tethys are the father and mother of the gods in the Iliad while in the seventh century BC the Spartan poet Alcman made the nereid Thetis a demiurge-figure. Orpheus's song in Book I of the Argonautica hymns Eurynome, a daughter of Oceanus, as first queen of the gods and as wife of Ophion, first king of the gods.

The pre-Socratic cosmogony of Thales, who made water the first element, may be seen as a natural outgrowth of this poetic thinking.

The primacy of water gods is reminiscent of, and may even have been influenced by, ancient Near Eastern mythology - where Tiamat (salt water) and Apsu (fresh water) are the first gods of the Enuma Elish, and where the Spirit of God is said to have "hovered over the waters" in Genesis.

Pontus is the primordial deity of the sea.

=== Poseidon ===
Poseidon, as god of the sea, was an important Olympian power; he was the chief patron of Corinth, many cities of Magna Graecia, and also of Plato's legendary Atlantis. He controls the oceans and the seas, and he also created horses. As such, he was intimately connected with the pre-historic office of king - whose chief emblem of power and primary sacrificial animal was the horse. Thus, on the Mycenean Linear B tablets found at Pylos, the name Poseidon occurs frequently in connection with the wanax ("king"), whose power and wealth were increasingly maritime rather than equestrian in nature. Surprisingly, Poseidon's name is found with greater frequency than that of Zeus, and is commonly linked (often in a secondary role) with Demeter. Poseidon is a brother of Zeus along with Hades and his father was Cronus, the leader of the Titans.

When the office of wanax disappeared during the Greek Dark Ages, the link between Poseidon and the kingship was largely, although not entirely, forgotten. In classical Athens, Poseidon was remembered as both the opponent and doublet of Erechtheus, the first king of Athens. Erechtheus was given a hero-cult at his tomb under the title Poseidon Erechtheus.

In another possible echo of this archaic association, the chief ritual of Atlantis, according to Plato's Critias, was a nocturnal horse-sacrifice offered to Poseidon by the kings of the mythical island power.

In keeping with the mythic equation between horsemanship and seamanship, the equestrian heroes Castor and Pollux were invoked by sailors against shipwreck. Ancient Greeks interpreted the phenomenon now called St. Elmo's Fire as the visible presence of the two brothers.

=== Old men and nymphs ===
Several types of water deities conform to a single type: that of Homer's halios geron or Old Man of the Sea: Nereus, Proteus, Glaucus and Phorkys. These water deities are not as powerful as Poseidon, the main god of the oceans and seas. Each is a shape-shifter, a prophet, and the father of either radiantly beautiful nymphs or hideous monsters (or both, in the case of Phorkys). Nymphs and monsters blur, for Hesiod relates that Phorcys was wed to the "beautiful-cheeked" Ceto, whose name is merely the feminine of the monstrous Cetus, to whom Andromeda was due to be sacrificed. Each appearance in myth tends to emphasize a different aspect of the archetype: Proteus and Nereus as shape-shifters and tricksters, Phorcys as a father of monsters, Nereus and Glaucus for truth-telling, Nereus for the beauty of his daughters.

Each one of these Old Men is the father or grandfather of many nymphs and/or monsters, who often bear names that are either metaphorical (Thetis, "establishment"; Telesto, "success") or geographical (Rhode from "Rhodes"; Nilos, "Nile"). Each cluster of Old Man and daughters is therefore a kind of pantheon in miniature, each one a different possible configuration of the spiritual, moral and physical world writ small – and writ around the sea.

The tantalizing figure of the halios geron has been a favorite of scholarship. The Old Men have been seen as everything from survivals of old Aegean gods who presided over the waves before Poseidon (Kerenyi) to embodiments of archaic speculation on the relation of truth to cunning intelligence (Detienne).

Homer's Odyssey contains a haunting description of a cave of the Nereids on Ithaca, close by a harbor sacred to Phorcys. The Neoplatonist philosopher Porphyry read this passage as an allegory of the whole universe – and he may not have been far off the mark.

== Otherworld and craft ==
Thus Cape Tanaerum, the point at which mainland Greece juts most sharply into the Mediterranean, was at once an important sailor's landmark, a shrine of Poseidon, and the point at which Orpheus and Heracles were said to have entered Hades.

This motif is apparent in the paradoxical festivals of the shadowy sea-deity Leucothea ("white goddess"), celebrated in many cities throughout the Greek world. Identifying her with the drowned heroine Ino, worshippers would offer sacrifice while engaged in frenzied mourning. The philosopher Xenophanes once remarked that if Leucothea were a goddess, one should not lament her; if she were mortal, one should not sacrifice to her.

At the same time, man's (always partial) mastery over the dangerous sea was one of the most potent marks of human skill and achievement. This theme is exemplified in the second choral ode of Sophocles's Antigone:

Wonders are many, and none is more wonderful than man. This power spans the sea, even when it surges white before the gales of the south-wind, and makes a path under swells that threaten to engulf him. (lines 332-338)

Certain water divinities are thus intimately bound up with the practice of human skill. The Telchines, for example, were a class of half-human, half-fish or dolphin water daemons said to have been the first inhabitants of Rhodes. These beings were at once revered for their metalwork and reviled for their death-dealing power of the evil eye. In Aeschylus's Prometheus Bound, the imprisoned craftsman is aided by the daughters of Ocean; and Hephaestus had his forge on "sea-girt Lemnos".

The nexus of sea, otherworld and craft is most strikingly embodied in the Cabeiri of Samothrace, who simultaneously oversaw salvation from shipwreck, metalcraft, and mystery-rites.

== Literature ==
In Homer's heavily maritime Odyssey, Poseidon rather than Zeus is the primary mover of events.

Although the sea-nymph Thetis appears only at the beginning and end of the Iliad, being absent for much of the middle, she is a powerful and near-omniscient figure when present. She is able to sway the will of Zeus, and to turn all the forges of Hephaestus to her purposes. Her prophecy of Achilles' fate bespeaks a degree of foreknowledge not available to most other gods in the epic.

Of enduring interest to scholars is the influence of Greco-Roman mythological cycles on saviour figures in later Celtic and Norse pagan traditions. Iain O'Donnell writes that "there can be no doubt that the Nereids of Knossos and the Selkies of Pictland both fit into the same archetype". With regards to Idun, David Reeceman has commented "the trope of the kidnapped maiden leading to perpetual dynastic conflict is far from being confined to the familiar Greco-Persian tales".

== Art ==
In classical art the fish-tailed merman with coiling tail was a popular subject, usually portrayed writhing in the wrestling grasp of Heracles. A similar wrestling scene shows Peleus and Thetis, often accompanied by a host of small animal icons representing her metamorphoses.

In Hellenistic art, the theme of the marine thiasos or "assembly of sea-gods" became a favorite of sculptors, allowing them to show off their skill in depicting flowing movement and aquiline grace in a way that land-based subjects did not.

In Roman times with the construction of bath houses throughout the empire, mosaic art achieved primacy in the depiction of water deities. Foremost of these were scenes of the Triumph of Poseidon (or Neptune), riding in a chariot drawn by Hippocamps and attended by a host of water deities and fish-tailed beasts. Large mosaic scenes also portrayed rows of sea-gods and nymphs arranged in a coiling procession of intertwined fish-tails. Other scenes show the birth of Aphrodite, often raised in a conch shell by a pair of sea centaurs, and accompanied by fishing Erotes (winged love gods). It was in this medium that most of the obscure maritime gods of Homer and Hesiod finally received standardised representation and attributes.

== Genealogy ==
Greek water deities

Gaia	Uranus
Oceanus	Tethys
The River gods	The Oceanids
Pontus	Thalassa
Nereus	Thaumas	Phorcys	Ceto	Eurybia	The Telchines	Halia	Poseidon	Aphrodite
Echidna	Gorgon	Graeae	Ladon	Hesperides	Thoosa	Helios	Rhodos
Stheno	Deino	Heliadae	Electryone
Euryale	Enyo
Medusa	Pemphredo
