= Theogonies =

Theogonies may refer to:

- The Theogony of Hesiod (8th–7th century BC)
- Other accounts of the origins of primordial deities in ancient Greek thought
