= Rhea (mythology) =

Ancient Greek goddess and mother of the gods

- Member of the Titans
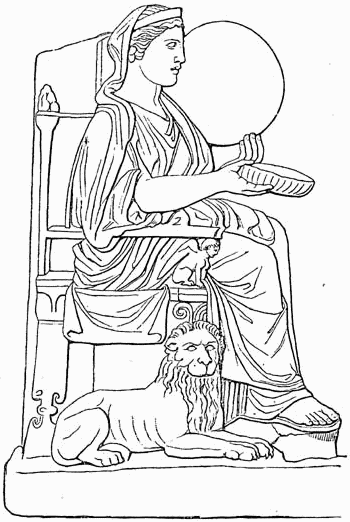
- Rhea in the drawing of a marble relief, 1888
- Ancient Greek: Ῥέα
- Animals: Lion
- Symbol: Chariot, tambourine, crown, cornucopia

Genealogy
- Parents: Uranus and Gaia
- Siblings: Titans: Crius; Coeus; Cronus; Dione; Hyperion; Iapetus; Mnemosyne; Oceanus; Phoebe; Tethys; Theia; Themis
- Consort: Cronus
- Offspring: Poseidon, Hades, Demeter, Hestia, Hera, Zeus

Equivalents
- Roman: Ops
- Phrygian: Matar Kubileya

In Greek mythology, Rhea, Rhia or Rheia (/ˈriːə/; Ancient Greek: Ῥέα [r̥é.aː] or Ῥεία [r̥ěː.aː]) was one of the Titans, the children of Uranus (Sky) and Gaia (Earth). She was the sister and wife of Cronus, and by him was the mother of Hestia, Demeter, Hera, Hades, Poseidon, and Zeus.

When Cronus learnt that he was destined to be overthrown by one of his children like his father before him, he swallowed all the children Rhea bore as soon as they were born. When Rhea had her sixth and final child, Zeus, she spirited him away and hid him in Crete, giving Cronus a rock to swallow instead, thus saving her youngest son who would go on to challenge his father's rule and rescue the rest of his siblings. Following Zeus's defeat of Cronus and the rise of the Olympian gods into power, Rhea withdraws from her role as the queen of the gods to become a supporting figure on Mount Olympus. She has some roles in the new Olympian era. She attended the birth of her grandchildren Apollo and Artemis, and raised her other grandson Dionysus. After Persephone was abducted by Hades, Rhea was sent to Demeter by Zeus. In the myth of Pelops, she resurrects the unfortunate youth after he has been slain.

In early traditions, she is known as "the mother of gods" and therefore is strongly associated with Gaia and Cybele, who have similar functions. The classical Greeks saw her as the mother of the Olympian gods and goddesses. The Romans identified her with Magna Mater (their form of Cybele), and the Goddess Ops.

== Etymology ==
Some ancient etymologists derived Rhea (Ῥέα) (by metathesis) from ἔρα (éra, 'ground', 'earth'); the same is suggested also by Ioannes Stamatakos. Other roots have been suggested by modern scholarship but Hjalmar Frisk considers a convincing etymology to be lacking.

A different tradition, embodied in Plato and in Chrysippus, connected the word with ῥέω (rhéo, 'flow, discharge'), Alternatively, the name Rhea may be connected with words for the pomegranate: ῥόα (rhóa), and later ῥοιά (rhoiá).

The name Rhea may ultimately derive from a Pre-Greek or Minoan source.

An alternative etymological hypothesis is that "re" (cloud/sky) as a foundational element in the ancient Illyric or pre-Albanian vocabulary could symbolize the sky or celestial phenomena. Given that Uranus is the sky god in Greek mythology, and "Rhea" is his daughter, it’s plausible to hypothesize that her name might have roots linked to "cloud" or "sky" in the ancient Balkanic language.

Therefore, "Rhea", as a daughter of Uranus, could be etymologically connected to this root, implying "daughter of the sky" or "cloud-born," fitting her mythological role as a primordial sky goddess or divine mother associated with celestial elements.

== Family ==
Rhea is the sister of the Titans (Oceanus, Crius, Hyperion, Iapetus, Coeus, Themis, Theia, Phoebe, Tethys, Mnemosyne, Cronus, and sometimes Dione), the Cyclopes, the Hecatoncheires, the Giants, the Meliae, and the Erinyes; and the half-sister of Aphrodite (in some versions), Typhon, Python, Pontus, Thaumas, Phorcys, Nereus, Eurybia, and Ceto.

According to Hesiod, Rhea had six children with Cronus: Hestia, Demeter, Hera, Hades, Poseidon, and Zeus. The philosopher Plato recounts that Rhea, Cronus, and Phorcys were the eldest children of Oceanus and Tethys.

According to the Orphic myths, Zeus wanted to marry his mother Rhea. After Rhea refused to marry him, Zeus turned into a snake and raped her. She had Persephone with Zeus.

== Mythology ==
=== Birth and children ===
Rhea was born to the earth goddess Gaia and the sky god Uranus, one of their twelve (or thirteen) Titan children. According to Hesiod, Uranus imprisoned all his children, while Apollodorus states he only imprisoned the Cyclopes and the Hecatoncheires, not the Titans. With the help of Gaia, the youngest child, Cronus, overthrew his father, became king in his place, freed his siblings, and took his sister Rhea to wife. Ophion and Eurynome, a daughter of Oceanus, were said to have ruled snowy Mount Olympus in the early age. Rhea and Cronus fought them, and threw them into the waves of the Ocean, thus becoming rulers in their place. Rhea, skilled in wrestling, battled Eurynome specifically.

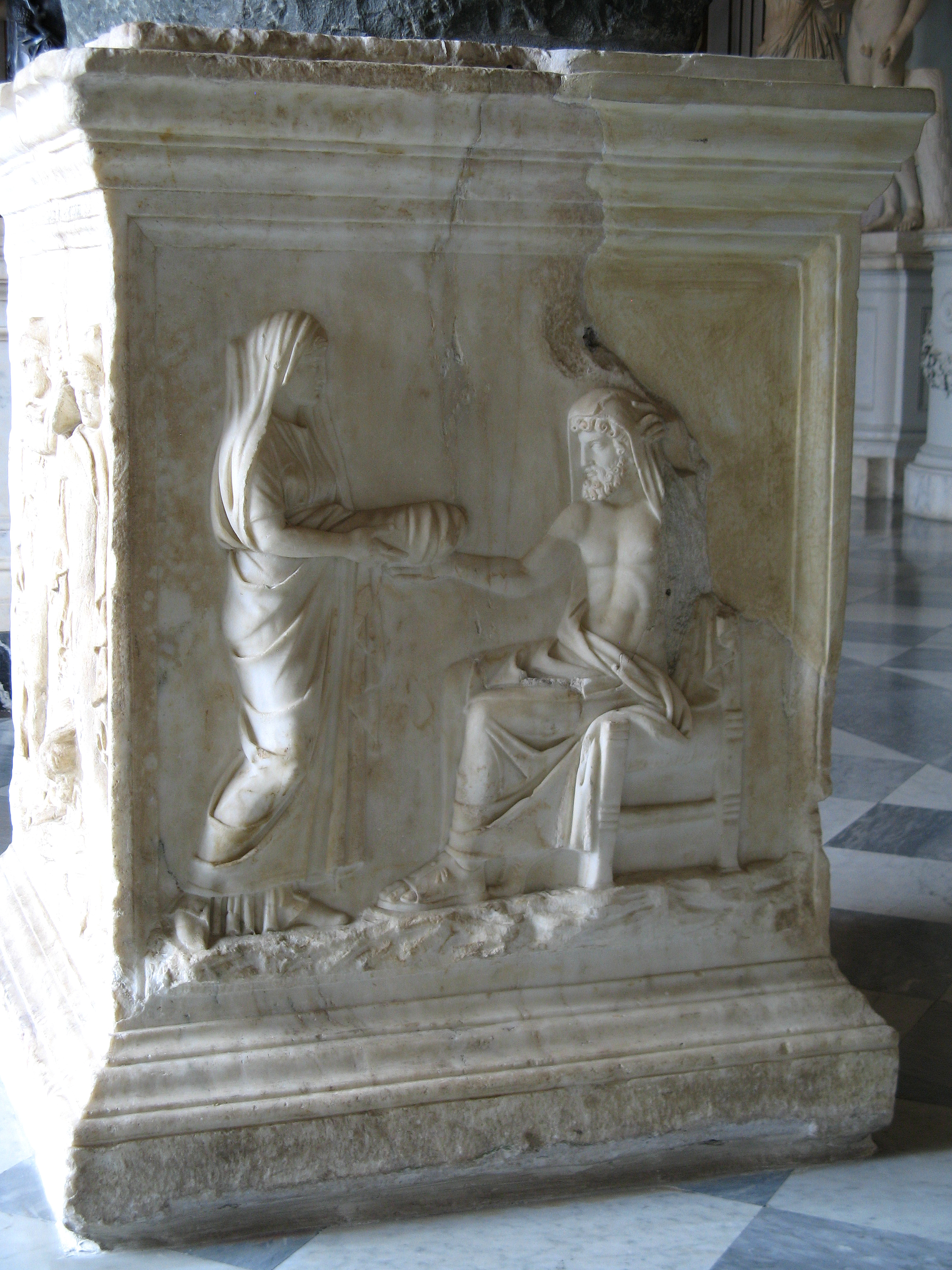
Rhea hands the swaddled stone to Cronus, 2nd century AD, Capitoline Museums

Gaia and Uranus told Cronus that just as he had overthrown his own father and become ruler of the cosmos, he was destined to be overcome by his own child; so as each of his children was born, he swallowed them. Rhea, Uranus, and Gaia devised a plan to save the last child, Zeus. Rhea gave birth to Zeus in a cavern on the island of Crete and gave Cronus a stone wrapped in swaddling clothes, which he promptly swallowed; Rhea hid Zeus in a cave on Mount Ida. Her attendants, the warrior-like Kouretes and Dactyls, acted as bodyguards for the infant Zeus, helping to conceal his whereabouts from his father. In some accounts, by the will of Rhea a golden dog guarded a goat which offered her udder and gave nourishment to the infant Zeus. Later on, Zeus changed the goat into an immortal among the stars while the golden dog that guarded the sacred spot in Crete was stolen by Pandareus.

In an obscure version, attested only on the east frieze of a temple at Lagina, the goddess of crossroads Hecate assisted Rhea in saving Zeus from his father. The frieze shows Hecate presenting to Cronus the swaddled stone while the real infant is being whisked away in safety.

While Zeus was still an infant hidden in Crete, Rhea caught her husband Cronus with his mistress the nymph Philyra in the act; Cronus then transformed into a horse and galloped away, in order not to be seen by his wife.

In some accounts, Rhea along with Metis gave Cronus the potion that made him disgorge the children he had eaten.

=== Olympian era ===
Following Zeus's ascension, Rhea withdrew from spotlight as she was no longer queen of gods, but remained an ally of her children and their families.

In some traditions, Rhea disapproved of her children Hera and Zeus getting married, so the two had to elope in order to be together. Rhea was present at the birth of her grandson Apollo, along with many other goddesses, the most notable exceptions being Hera and Eileithyia, the goddess of childbirth, whose absence left Leto in terrible agony. Rhea was said to be a goddess who eased childbirth for women.

After Demeter reunited with her daughter Persephone, Zeus sent Rhea to persuade Demeter to return to Olympus and rejoin the gods.

Rhea raised another one of her grandsons, Dionysus, after the fiery death of his mother, the mortal princess Semele. Later on she went on to heal Dionysus's raging madness, which had been inflicted on him by the jealous Hera, causing him to wander around aimlessly for some time. Rhea gave Dionysus the amethyst, which was thought to prevent drunkenness. Rhea sometimes joined Dionysus and his Maenads in their frenzy dances.

According to Bacchylides, it was Rhea herself who restored Pelops to life after his father Tantalus cut him down.

Alongside Aphrodite, the Mother of the Gods (Rhea or Cybele) rescued Creusa during the fall of Troy. She was the wife of Aphrodite's son, Aeneas, and would have been enslaved by the Greeks if not for their intervention. As for Aeneas, when he landed in Italy, a local warlord named Turnus set his pine-framed vessels ablaze. Rhea (or Cybele), remembering that those hulls had been crafted from trees felled on her holy mountains, transformed the vessels into sea nymphs.

After Hippomenes won the hand of Atalanta in marriage thanks to the help he received from Aphrodite, he neglected to thank her. Thus the goddess inflicted them with great passion for each other when they were near a temple of Rhea. The two then proceeded to have sex inside the temple. In anger, Rhea turned them into lions.

At some point, a mortal man named Sangas offended the goddess, and she turned him into a river that bore his name; Sangarius (now Sakarya River) in Asia Minor. In a similar manner a Phrygian man named Pyrrhus tried to rape her, but the goddess changed him into stone for his hubris.

In one Orphic myth, Zeus was filled with desire for his mother and pursued her, only for Rhea to refuse him and change into a serpent to flee. Zeus also turned himself into a serpent and raped her. The child born from that union was their daughter Persephone, and afterwards Rhea became Demeter. The child, Persephone, was born so deformed that Rhea ran away from her frightened, and did not breastfeed her daughter.

== Cult ==
Rhea had "no strong local cult or identifiable activity under her control." She was originally worshiped on the island of Crete, identified in mythology as the site of Zeus's infancy and upbringing. Her cults employed rhythmic, raucous chants and dances, accompanied by the tympanon (a wide, handheld drum), to provoke a religious ecstasy. Her priests impersonated her mythical attendants, the Curetes and Dactyls, with a clashing of bronze shields and cymbals.

The tympanon's use in Rhea's rites may have been the source for its use in Cybele's – in historical times, the resemblances between the two goddesses were so marked that some Greeks regarded Cybele as their own Rhea, who had deserted her original home on Mount Ida in Crete and fled to the wilds of Phrygia to escape Cronus.

Rhea was often referred to as Meter Theon ("Mother of the Gods") and there were several temples around Ancient Greece dedicated to her under that name. Pausanias mentioned temples dedicated to Rhea under the name Meter Theon in Anagyros in Attika, Megalopolis in Arkadia, on the Acropolis of Ancient Corinth, and in the district of Keramaikos in Athens, where the statue was made by Pheidias. In Sparta there was furthermore a sanctuary to Meter Megale ("[the] Great Mother"). Olympia had both an altar and a temple to the Meter Theon:

A temple of no great size [at Olympia] in the Doric style they have called down to the present day Metroion (Temple of the Mother), keeping its ancient name. No image lies in it of the Meter Theon (Mother of the Gods), but there stand in it statues of Roman emperors.

Her temple in Akriai, Lakedaimon, was said to be her oldest sanctuary in the Peloponnese:

Well worth seeing here [at Akriai, Lakedaimon,] are a temple and marble image of the Meter Theon (Mother of the Gods). The people of Akriai say that this is the oldest sanctuary of this goddess in the Peloponnesus.

Statues of her were also standing in the sanctuaries of other gods and in other places, such as a statue of Parian marble by Damophon in Messene. The scene in which Rhea gave Chronos a stone in the place of Zeus after his birth was assigned to have taken place on Petrakhos Mountain in Arcadia as well as on Mount Thaumasios in Arcadia, both of which were holy places:

Mount Thaumasios (Wonderful) lies beyond the river Maloitas [in Arkadia], and the Methydrians hold that when Rhea was pregnant with Zeus, she came to this mountain and enlisted as her allies, in case Kronos should attack her, Hopladamos and his few Gigantes. They allow that she gave birth to her son on some part of Mount Lykaios, but they claim that here Kronos was deceived, and here took place the substitution of a stone for the child that is spoken of in the Greek legend. On the summit of the mountain is Rhea's Cave, into which no human beings may enter save only the women who are sacred to the goddess.

The center of the worship of Rhea was however on Crete, where Mount Ida was said to be the birthplace of Zeus. Reportedly, there was a "House of Rhea" in Knossos:

The Titanes had their dwelling in the land about Knosos [in Krete], at the place where even to this day men point out foundations of a house of Rhea and a cypress grove which has been consecrated to her from ancient times.

Upon Mount Ida, there was a cave sacred to Rhea:

In Crete there is said to be a sacred cave full of bees. In it, as storytellers say, Rhea gave birth to Zeus; it is a sacred place and no one is to go near it, whether god or mortal. At the appointed time each year a great blaze is seen to come out of the cave. Their story goes on to say that this happens whenever the blood from the birth of Zeus begins to boil up. The sacred bees that were the nurses of Zeus occupy this cave.

== Iconography ==
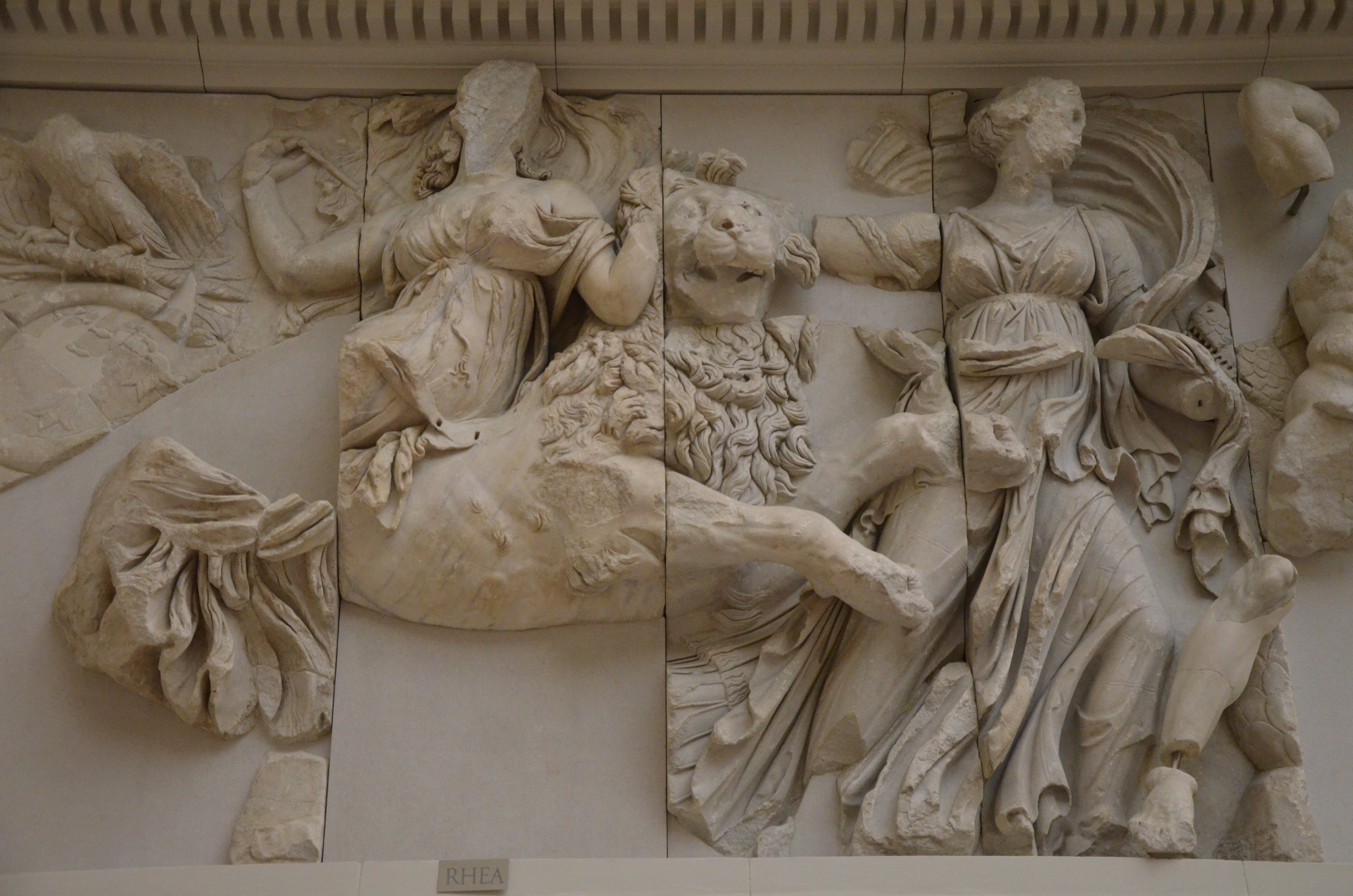
Rhea (left) on the Pergamon Altar (2nd century BC)

Rhea only appears in Greek art from the fourth century BC, when her iconography draws on that of Cybele; the two therefore are often indistinguishable; both can be shown wearing a crown (either a Mural crown or a Polos), seated on a throne flanked by lions, riding a lion, and on a chariot drawn by two lions. In Roman religion, her counterpart Cybele was Magna Mater deorum Idaea, who was brought to Rome and was identified in as an ancestral Trojan deity. On a functional level, Rhea was thought equivalent to Roman Ops or Opis.

== Depiction in ancient literature ==
In Homer, Rhea is the mother of the gods, although not a universal mother like Cybele, the Phrygian Great Mother, with whom she was later identified.

In the Argonautica by Apollonius of Rhodes, the fusion of Rhea and Phrygian Cybele is completed. "Upon the Mother depend the winds, the ocean, the whole earth beneath the snowy seat of Olympus; whenever she leaves the mountains and climbs to the great vault of heaven, Zeus himself, the son of Cronus, makes way, and all the other immortal gods likewise make way for the dread goddess," the seer Mopsus tells Jason in Argonautica; Jason climbed to the sanctuary high on Mount Dindymon to offer sacrifice and libations to placate the goddess, so that the Argonauts might continue on their way. For her temenos they wrought an image of the goddess, a xoanon, from a vine-stump. There "they called upon the mother of Dindymon, mistress of all, the dweller in Phrygia, and with her Titias and Kyllenos who alone of the many Cretan Daktyls of Ida are called 'guiders of destiny' and 'those who sit beside the Idaean Mother'." They leapt and danced in their armour: "For this reason the Phrygians still worship Rhea with tambourines and drums".

== Descendants ==
Descendants of Cronus and Rhea

Gaia
Uranus
Uranus's genitals	Coeus	Phoebe	Cronus	RHEA
Leto	Zeus	Hera	Poseidon	Hades	Demeter	Hestia
Apollo	Artemis	a
b
Ares	Hephaestus
Metis
Athena
Maia
Hermes
Semele
Dionysus
Dione
a	b
Aphrodite

== Significant modern namesakes ==
- The name of the bird species Rhea is derived from the goddess's name Rhea.
- Rhea, the second largest moon of the planet Saturn, is named after her.
- WWE wrestler Rhea Ripley was inspired by the goddess Rhea when creating her stage name.
