= Phorcides =

The Phorcides /ˈfɔːrsɪˌdiːz/ or Phorcydes ("the children of Phorcys") may refer to:

- The Phorcides, another name for the children of Phorcys in Greek mythology
- The Phorcides, a lost play about the Graeae by the 5th century BC Greek playwright Aeschylus
- Phorcides, a clinical decision support software for eye surgeons.
