= Ceto =

Ancient Greek sea goddess

- Sea goddess
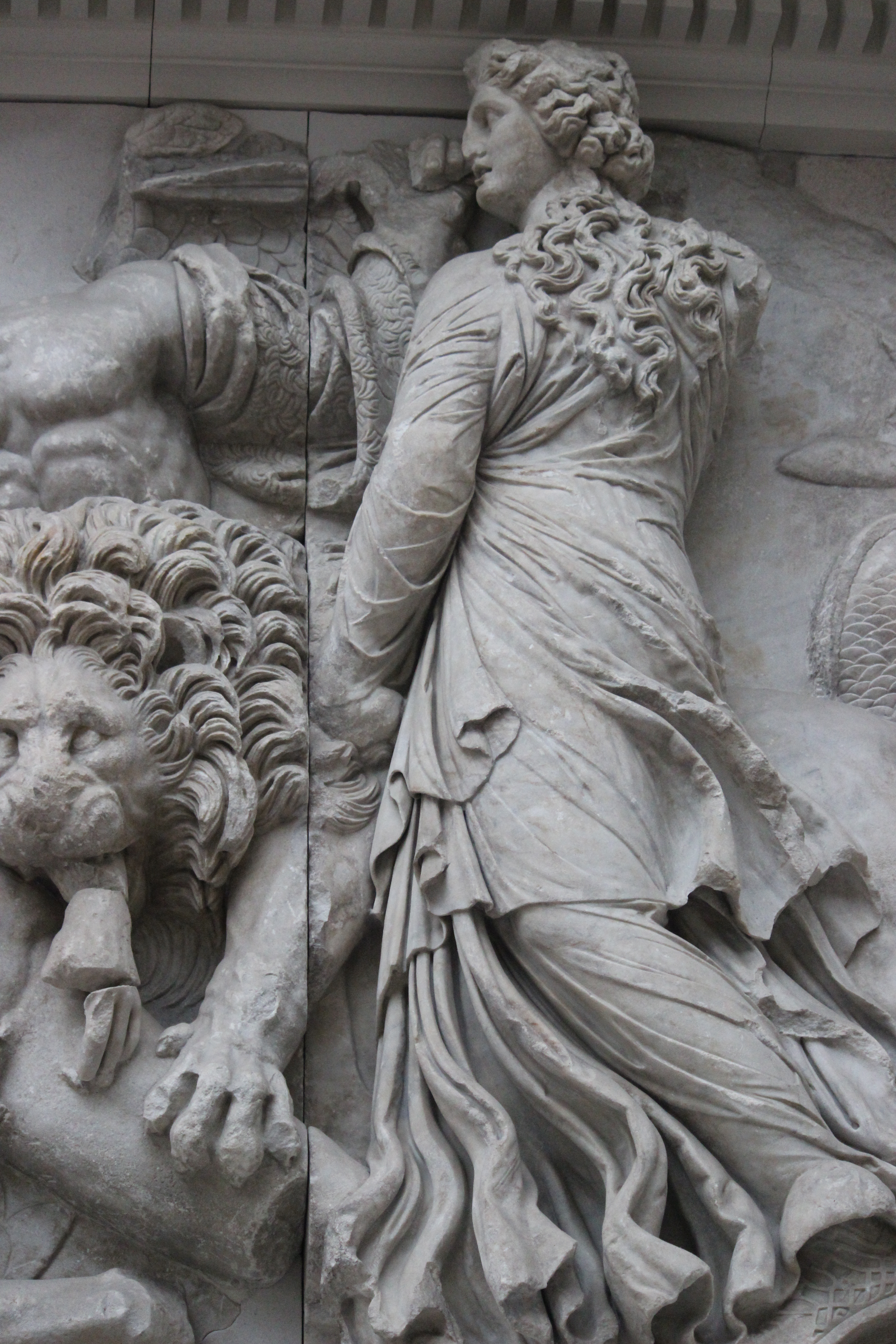
- The goddess Ceto aiding her father Pontus in the mythological war known as the Gigantomachy – c. 166–156 BC – Gigantomachy Frieze, Pergamon Altar of Zeus
- Abode: Sea

Genealogy
- Parents: Pontus and Gaia
- Siblings: Nereus, Thaumas, Phorcys and Eurybia
- Consort: Phorcys
- Children: the Gorgons, the Graeae, Echidna, Ladon

Ceto (/ˈsiːtoʊ/; Ancient Greek: Κητώ, romanized: Kētṓ, lit. 'sea monster') is a primordial sea goddess in Greek mythology, the daughter of Pontus and his mother, Gaia. As a mythological figure, she is considered to be one of the most ancient deities, and bore a host of monstrous children fathered by Phorcys, another child of Gaia and Pontus. The small Solar System body 65489 Ceto was named after her, and its satellite after Phorcys.

This goddess should not be confused with the minor Oceanid also named Ceto, or with various mythological beings referred to as ketos (plural kētē or ketea); this is a general term for "sea monster" in Ancient Greek.

== Family ==
Besides Ceto, Gaia (Earth) and Pontus had four other offspring, Nereus, Thaumas, Phorcys and Eurybia. Hesiod's Theogony lists the children of Ceto and Phorcys as the two Graiae: Pemphredo and Enyo, and the three Gorgons: Medusa, as well as Stheno and Euryale, with their last offspring being an unnamed serpent (later called Ladon, by Apollonius of Rhodes) who guards the golden apples. Also according to Hesiod, the half-woman, half-snake Echidna was born to a "she" who was probably meant by Hesiod to be Ceto, (with Phorcys the likely father); however the "she" might instead refer to the Oceanid Callirhoe. The mythographer Pherecydes of Athens (5th century BC) has Echidna as the daughter of Phorcys, without naming a mother.

The mythographers Apollodorus and Hyginus each name three daughters as the offspring of Ceto and Phorcys: Pemphredo, Dino and Persis, collectively called the Graeae ("old women"). Apollodorus and Hyginus also make Ladon the offspring of Echidna and Typhon, rather than Ceto and Phorcys.

The Scholiast on Apollonius Rhodius cites Phorcys and Ceto as the parents of the Hesperides, but this assertion is not repeated in other ancient sources.

Ceto is possibly the mother of the Nemean lion and the Sphinx by her grandson Orthrus.

Homer refers to Thoosa, the mother of Polyphemus in the Odyssey, as a daughter of Phorcys, but does not indicate whether Ceto is her mother.

== Cult ==
Pliny the Elder mentions worship of "storied Ceto" at Joppa (now Jaffa), in a single reference, immediately after his mention of Andromeda, whom Perseus rescued from a sea-monster (Cetus). S. Safrai and M. Stern suggest the possibility that someone at Joppa established a cult of the monster under the name Ceto. As an alternative explanation, they posit that Pliny or his source misread the name cetus—or that of the Syrian goddess Derceto.
