= Tethys (mythology) =

Ancient Greek mythological figure

- Member of the Titans
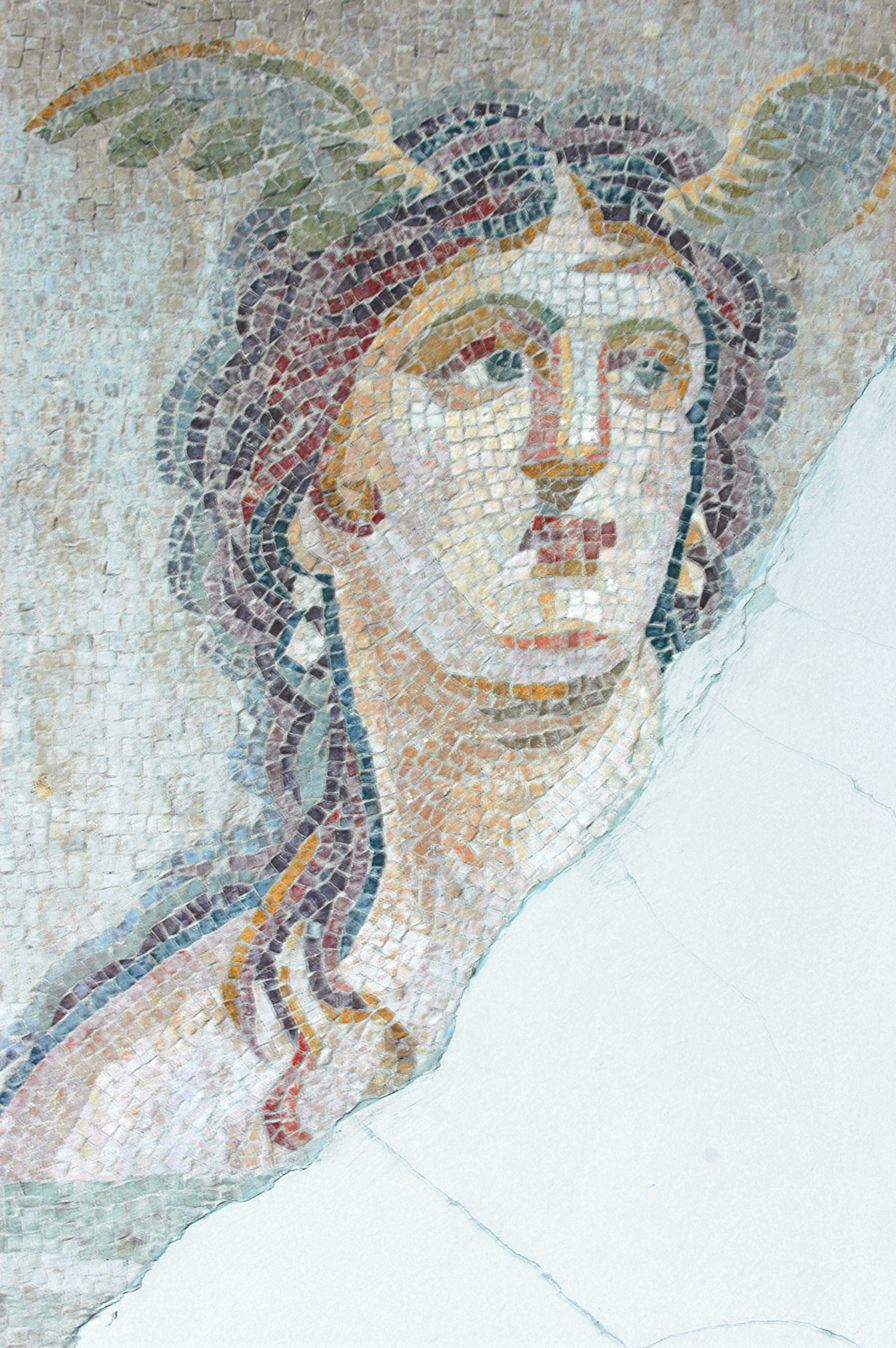
- Mosaic (detail) of Tethys from Alexandretta
- Symbol: Winged brow

Genealogy
- Parents: Uranus and Gaia
- Siblings: Titans: Crius; Cronus; Coeus; Hyperion; Iapetus; Mnemosyne; Oceanus; Phoebe; Rhea; Theia; Themis; Hecatoncheires: Briareos; Cottus; Gyges; Cyclopes: Arges; Brontes; Steropes; Other siblings: Gigantes; Erinyes (the Furies); Meliae; Half-siblings: Aphrodite; Eurybia; Ceto; Nereus; Phorcys; Pontus; Python; Thaumas; Typhon; Uranus
- Consort: Oceanus
- Offspring: Many river gods including: Achelous, Alpheus, and Scamander Many Oceanids including: Callirhoe, Clymene, Eurynome, Doris, Idyia, Metis, Perseis, and Styx

In Greek mythology, Tethys (/ˈtiːθɪs, ˈtɛ-/; Ancient Greek: Τηθύς, romanized: Tēthýs) was one of the Titans, the children of Uranus (Sky) and Gaia (Earth), the sister and wife of the Titan Oceanus, and the mother of the river gods and the Oceanids. Although Tethys had no active role in Greek mythology and no established cults, she was depicted in mosaics decorating baths, pools, and triclinia in the Greek East, particularly in Antioch and its suburbs, either alone or with Oceanus.

== Genealogy ==
Tethys was one of the Titan offspring of Uranus (Sky) and Gaia (Earth). Hesiod lists her Titan siblings as Oceanus, Coeus, Crius, Hyperion, Iapetus, Theia, Rhea, Themis, Mnemosyne, Phoebe, and Cronus. Tethys married her brother Oceanus, an enormous river encircling the world, and was by him the mother of numerous sons (the river gods) and numerous daughters (the Oceanids).

According to Hesiod, there were three thousand (i.e. innumerable) river gods. These included Achelous, the god of the Achelous River, the largest river in Greece, who gave his daughter in marriage to Alcmaeon and was defeated by Heracles in a wrestling contest for the right to marry Deianira; Alpheus, who fell in love with the nymph Arethusa and pursued her to Syracuse, where she was transformed into a spring by Artemis; and Scamander who fought on the side of the Trojans during the Trojan War and, offended when Achilles polluted his waters with a large number of Trojan corpses, overflowed his banks nearly drowning Achilles.

According to Hesiod, there were also three thousand Oceanids. These included Metis, Zeus's first wife, whom Zeus impregnated with Athena and then swallowed; Eurynome, Zeus's third wife, and mother of the Charites; Doris, the wife of Nereus and mother of the Nereids; Callirhoe, the wife of Chrysaor and mother of Geryon; Clymene, the wife of Iapetus, and mother of Atlas, Menoetius, Prometheus, and Epimetheus; Perseis, wife of Helios and mother of Circe and Aeetes; Idyia, wife of Aeetes and mother of Medea; and Styx, goddess of the river Styx, and the wife of Pallas and mother of Zelus, Nike, Kratos, and Bia.

Tethys's immediate family, according to Hesiod's Theogony

Uranus	Gaia	Pontus
Oceanus	TETHYS	Coeus	Phoebe	Crius	Eurybia
The Rivers	The Oceanids	Leto	Asteria	Astraeus	Pallas	Perses
Hyperion	Theia	Iapetus	Clymene
Helios	Selene	Eos	Atlas	Menoetius	Prometheus	Epimetheus
Cronus	Rhea
Hestia	Demeter	Hera	Hades	Poseidon	Zeus
Themis	(Zeus)	Mnemosyne
The Horae	The Moirai	The Muses

=== Primeval mother ===
Passages in book 14 of the Iliad, called the Deception of Zeus, suggest the possibility that Homer knew a tradition in which Oceanus and Tethys (rather than Uranus and Gaia, as in Hesiod) were the primeval parents of the gods. Twice Homer has Hera describe the pair as "Oceanus, from whom the gods are sprung, and mother Tethys". According to M. L. West, these lines suggests a myth in which Oceanus and Tethys are the "first parents of the whole race of gods." However, as Timothy Gantz points out, "mother" could simply refer to the fact that Tethys was Hera's foster mother for a time, as Hera tells us in the lines immediately following, while the reference to Oceanus as the genesis of the gods "might be simply a formulaic epithet indicating the numberless rivers and springs descended from Okeanos" (compare with Iliad 21.195–197). But, in a later Iliad passage, Hypnos also describes Oceanus as "genesis for all", which, according to Gantz, is hard to understand as meaning other than that, for Homer, Oceanus was the father of the Titans.

Plato, in his Timaeus, provides a genealogy (probably Orphic) which perhaps reflected an attempt to reconcile this apparent divergence between Homer and Hesiod, in which Uranus and Gaia are the parents of Oceanus and Tethys, and Oceanus and Tethys are the parents of Cronus and Rhea and the other Titans, as well as Phorcys. In his Cratylus, Plato quotes Orpheus as saying that Oceanus and Tethys were "the first to marry", possibly also reflecting an Orphic theogony in which Oceanus and Tethys—rather than Uranus and Gaia—were the primeval parents. Plato's apparent inclusion of Phorcys as a Titan (being the brother of Cronus and Rhea), and the mythographer Apollodorus's inclusion of Dione, the mother of Aphrodite by Zeus, as a thirteenth Titan, suggests an Orphic tradition in which Hesiod's twelve Titans were the offspring of Oceanus and Tethys, with Phorcys and Dione taking the place of Oceanus and Tethys.

According to Epimenides, the first two beings, Night and Aer, produced Tartarus, who in turn produced two Titans (possibly Oceanus and Tethys) from whom came the world egg.

== Mythology ==
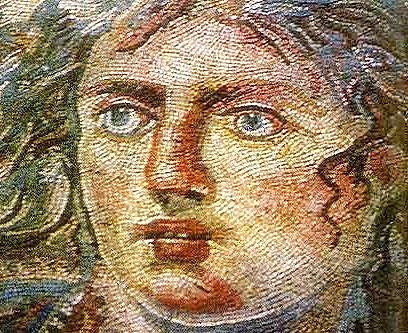
Mosaic (detail) of Tethys, from Philipopolis (modern Shahba, Syria), fourth-century AD, Shahba Museum.

Tethys played no active part in Greek mythology. The only early story concerning Tethys is what Homer has Hera briefly relate in the Iliad's Deception of Zeus passage. There, Hera says that when Zeus was in the process of deposing Cronus, she was given by her mother Rhea to Tethys and Oceanus for safekeeping and that they "lovingly nursed and cherished me in their halls". Hera relates this while dissembling that she is on her way to visit Oceanus and Tethys in the hopes of reconciling her foster parents, who are angry with each other and are no longer having sexual relations.

Originally Oceanus's consort, at a later time Tethys came to be identified with the sea, and in Hellenistic and Roman poetry Tethys's name came to be used as a poetic term for the sea.

The only other story involving Tethys is an apparently late astral myth concerning the polar constellation Ursa Major (the Great Bear), which was thought to represent the catasterism of Callisto who was transformed into a bear and placed by Zeus among the stars. The myth explains why the constellation never sets below the horizon, saying that since Callisto had been Zeus's lover, she was forbidden by Tethys from "touching Ocean's deep" out of concern for her foster-child Hera, Zeus's jealous wife.

Claudian wrote that Tethys nursed two of her nephlings in her breast, Helios and Selene, the children of her siblings Hyperion and Theia, during their infancy, when their light was weak and had not yet grown into their older, more luminous selves.

In Ovid's Metamorphoses, Tethys turns Aesacus into a diving bird.

Tethys was sometimes confused with another sea goddess, the sea-nymph Thetis, wife of Peleus and mother of Achilles.

== Tethys as Tiamat ==
M. L. West detects in the Iliad's Deception of Zeus passage an allusion to a possible archaic myth "according to which [Tethys] was the mother of the gods, long estranged from her husband," speculating that the estrangement might refer to a separation of "the upper and lower waters ... corresponding to that of heaven and earth," which parallels the story of "Apsū and Tiamat in the Babylonian cosmology, the male and female waters, which were originally united (En. El. I. 1 ff.)," but that, "By Hesiod's time the myth may have been almost forgotten and Tethys remembered only as the name of Oceanus' wife." This possible correspondence between Oceanus and Tethys, and Apsū and Tiamat has been noticed by several authors, with Tethys's name possibly having been derived from that of Tiamat.

== Iconography ==
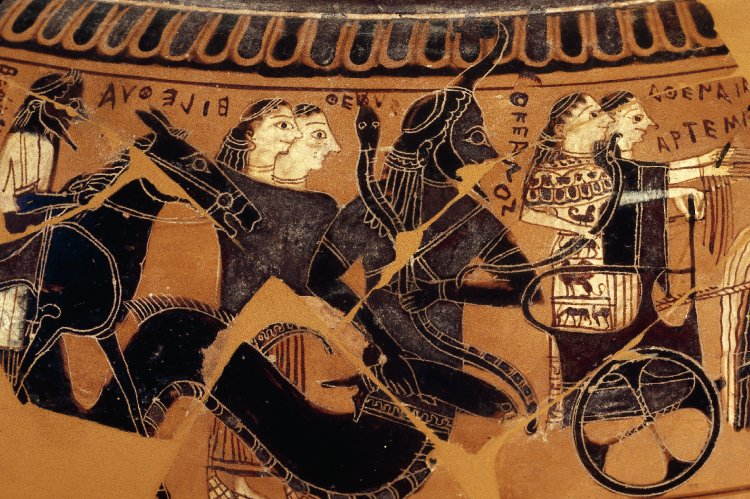
Detail of Tethys attending the wedding of Peleus and Thetis on an Attic black-figure dinos by Sophilos, c. 600–550 BC, British Museum 971.11–1.1.

Representations of Tethys before the Roman period are rare. Tethys appears, identified by inscription (ΘΕΘΥΣ), as part of an illustration of the wedding of Peleus and Thetis on the early sixth-century BC Attic black-figure "Erskine" dinos by Sophilos (British Museum 1971.111–1.1). Accompanied by Eileithyia, the goddess of childbirth, Tethys follows close behind Oceanus at the end of a procession of gods invited to the wedding. Tethys is also conjectured to be represented in a similar illustration of the wedding of Peleus and Thetis depicted on the early sixth-century BC Attic black-figure François Vase (Florence 4209). Tethys probably also appeared as one of the gods fighting the Giants in the Gigantomachy frieze of the second-century BC Pergamon Altar. Only fragments of the figure remain: a part of a chiton below Oceanus's left arm and a hand clutching a large tree branch visible behind Oceanus's head.

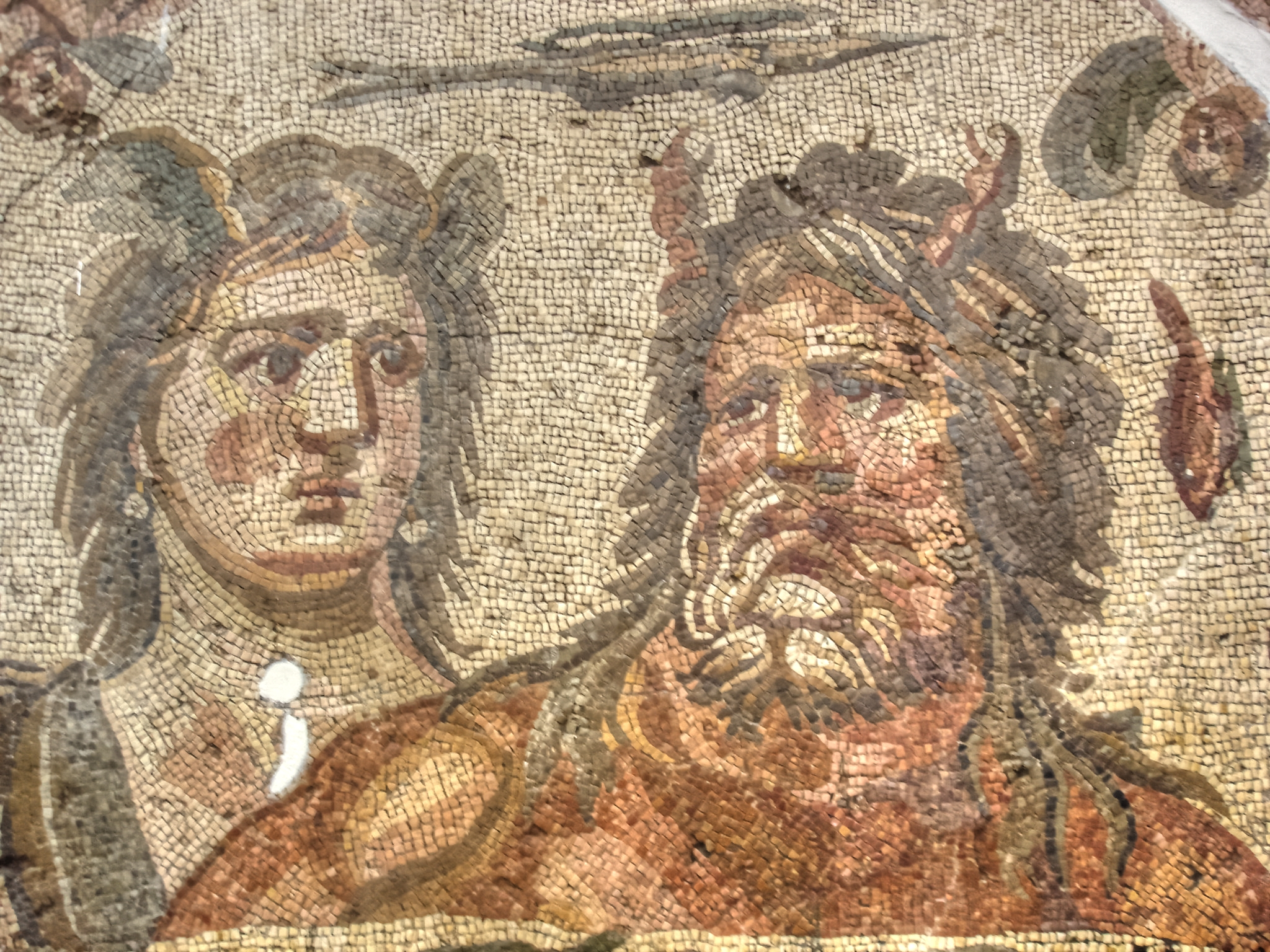
Mosaic (detail) of Tethys and Oceanus, excavated from the House of Menander, Daphne (modern Harbiye, Turkey), third century AD, Hatay Archaeology Museum 1013.

During the second to fourth centuries AD, Tethys—sometimes with Oceanus, sometimes alone—became a relatively frequent feature of mosaics decorating baths, pools, and triclinia in the Greek East, particularly in Antioch and its suburbs. Her identifying attributes are wings sprouting from her forehead, a rudder/oar, and a ketos, a creature from Greek mythology with the head of a dragon and the body of a snake. The earliest of these mosaics, identified as Tethys, decorated a triclinium overlooking a pool, excavated from the House of the Calendar in Antioch, dated to shortly after AD 115 (Hatay Archaeology Museum 850). Tethys, reclining on the left, with Oceanus reclining on the right, has long hair, a winged forehead, and is nude to the waist with draped legs. A ketos twines around her raised right arm. Other mosaics of Tethys with Oceanus include Hatay Archaeology Museum 1013 (from the House of Menander, Daphne), Hatay Archaeology Museum 9095, and Baltimore Museum of Art 1937.126 (from the House of the Boat of Psyches: triclinium).

In other mosaics, Tethys appears without Oceanus. One of these is a fourth-century AD mosaic from a pool (probably a public bath) found at Antioch, now installed in Boston, Massachusetts at the Harvard Business School's Morgan Hall and formerly at Dumbarton Oaks, Washington, D.C. (Dumbarton Oaks 76.43). Besides the Sophilos dinos, this is the only other representation of Tethys identified by inscription. Here Tethys, with a winged forehead, rises from the sea bare-shouldered, with long dark hair parted in the middle. A golden rudder rests against her right shoulder. Others include Hatay Archaeology Museum 9097, Shahba Museum (in situ), Baltimore Museum of Art 1937.118 (from the House of the Boat of Psyches: Room six), and Memorial Art Gallery 42.2.

Toward the end of the period represented by these mosaics, Tethys's iconography appears to merge with that of another sea goddess Thalassa, the Greek personification of the sea (thalassa being the Greek word for the sea). Such a transformation would be consistent with the frequent use of Tethys's name as a poetic reference to the sea in Roman poetry (see above).

== Modern use of the name ==
Tethys, a moon of the planet Saturn, and the prehistoric Tethys Ocean are named after this goddess.
