= Greek primordial deities =

First generation of deities in Greek mythology

The primordial deities of Greek mythology are the first generation of gods and goddesses. These deities represented the fundamental forces and physical foundations of the world and were generally not actively worshipped, as they, for the most part, were not given human characteristics; they were instead personifications of places or abstract concepts.

Hesiod, in his Theogony, considers the first beings (after Chaos) to be Erebus, Gaia, Tartarus, Eros and Nyx. Gaia and her son Uranus, whose severed genitals later created the goddess Aphrodite from sea foam, in turn gave birth to the Titans, and the Cyclopes. The Titans Cronus and Rhea then gave birth to the generation of the Olympians: Zeus, Poseidon, Hades, Hestia, Hera and Demeter. They overthrew the Titans, with the reign of Zeus marking the end of the period of warfare and usurpation among the gods.

== Hesiod's primordial genealogy ==
Hesiod's Theogony (c. 700 BC), which could be considered the "standard" creation myth of Greek mythology, tells the story of the genesis of the gods. After invoking the Muses (II.1–116), Hesiod says the world began with the spontaneous generation of four beings: first arose Chaos (Chasm); then came Gaia (the Earth), "the ever-sure foundation of all"; "dim" Tartarus (the Underworld), in the depths of the Earth; and Eros (Love) "fairest among the deathless gods". (Although in other myths, Eros was the name of Aphrodite's and Ares's son.)

From Chaos came Erebus (Darkness) and Nyx (Night). And Nyx "from union in love" with Erebus produced Aether (Light) and Hemera (Day). From Gaia came Uranus (Sky), the Ourea (Mountains), and Pontus (Sea).

== Chaos ==
In Hesiod's creation myth, Chaos is the first being to ever exist. Chaos is both seen as a deity and a thing, with some sources seeing chaos as an endless void of nothingness from which the universe sprang. In some accounts Chaos existed first alongside Eros and Nyx, while in others Chaos is the first and only thing in the universe. In some stories, Chaos is seen as existing beneath Tartarus. Chaos is the parent to Night and Darkness.

== Gaia ==
Gaia was the second being to be formed, right after Chaos, in Hesiod's theogony, and parthenogenetically gave birth to Uranus (who would later become her husband and her equal), the Sea, and to the high Mountains.

Gaia is a mother earth figure and is the mother of the titans, while also being the seat on which they exist. Gaia is the Greek Equivalent to the Roman goddess, Tellus / Terra. The story of Uranus' castration at the hands of Cronus due to Gaia's involvement is seen as the explanation for why the Sky and Earth are separated. In Hesiod's story, Earth seeks revenge against Sky for hiding her children the Cyclopes deep within Tartarus. Gaia then goes to her other children and asks for their help to get revenge against their cruel father; of her children, only Cronus, the youngest and "most dreadful" of them all, agrees to do this. Gaia plans an ambush against Uranus where she hides Cronus and gives him the sickle to castrate Uranus. In the spots where his blood hit the earth, monsters and creatures grew including the Erinyes, the Giants, and the Melian nymphs. Cronus goes on to have six children with his sister, Rhea; who become the Olympians. Cronus is later overthrown by his son, Zeus, much in the same way he overthrew his father. Gaia is the mother to the twelve Titans: Oceanus, Coeus, Crius, Hyperion, Iapetus, Theia, Rhea, Themis, Mnemosyne, Phoebe, Tethys, and Cronus.

Later in the myth, after his succession, Uranus curses Cronus so that his own son (Zeus) will overthrow him, just as Cronus did to Uranus. To try to prevent this, Cronus swallows all of his children as soon as they are born. Rhea seeks out help in hiding her youngest son, Zeus, Gaia hears her distress and gives her a perfectly infant shaped rock that weighs and looks the same as a baby to give to Cronus. Zeus later goes on to defeat his father and become the leader of the Olympians.

After Zeus's succession to the throne, Gaia bears another son with Tartarus, Typhon, a monster who would be the last to challenge Zeus's throne.

Uranus and Gaia have three sets of children: the Titans, the Cyclopes, and the Hecatoncheires.

== Tartarus ==
Tartarus is described by Hesiod as both a primordial deity and also a great abyss where the Titans are imprisoned. Tartarus is seen as a prison, but is also where Day, Night, Sleep, and Death dwell, and also imagined as a great gorge that is a distinct part of the underworld. Hesiod tells that it took nine days for the Titans to fall to the bottom of Tartarus, describing how deep the abyss is. In some versions Tartarus is described as a "misty darkness" where Death, Styx, and Erebus reside.

== Eros ==
Eros is the god of love in Greek mythology, and in some versions is one of the primordial beings that first came to be parentlessly. In Hesiod's version, Eros was the "fairest among the immortal gods ... who conquers the mind and sensible thoughts of all gods and men."

== Nyx ==
In some variations of Hesiod's Theogony, Nyx (Night) is told as having black wings; and in one tale she laid an egg in Erebus from which Eros sprang. One version of Hesiod's tale tells that Night shares her house with Day in Tartarus, but that the two are never home at the same time. However, in some versions Nyx's home is where Chaos and Tartarus meet, suggesting to the idea that Chaos resides beneath Tartarus.

Hyginus also includes Epaphus and Porphyrion among Nyx's children. Some accounts also include Hecate (Crossroads and Magic) among Nyx's children.

Aether, Hemera, and Eros are Nyx's only children who are among the primordial gods. Hesiod says Nyx and Erebus together had Aether and Hemera, but Nyx had the other children on her own. Cicero and Hyginus say Nyx had all her children with Erebus.

In Virgil's Aeneid, Nox (the Latin equivalent of Nyx) is said to be the mother of the Furies by Hades.

Some authors made Nyx the mother of Eos, the dawn goddess, who was often conflated with Nyx's daughter Hemera. When Eos' son Memnon was killed during the Trojan War, Eos made Helios (the sun god) downcast, and asked Nyx to come out earlier so that she would collect her son's dead body undetected by the Greek and the Trojan armies.

Nyx's daughter Eris went on to have many children of her own who were also personifications of abstract concepts.

== Non-Hesiodic theogonies ==
The ancient Greeks entertained different versions of the origin of primordial deities.

=== Homeric primordial theogony ===
The Iliad, an epic poem attributed to Homer about the Trojan War (an oral tradition of c. 700–600 BC), states that Oceanus (and possibly Tethys, too) is the parent of all the deities.

=== Other Greek theogonies ===
- Alcman (fl. 7th century BC) called Thetis the first goddess, producing poros (path), tekmor (marker), and skotos (darkness) on the pathless, featureless void.
- Aristophanes (c. 446–386 BC) wrote in his play The Birds that Nyx was the first deity also, and that she produced Eros from an egg.

=== Philosophical theogonies ===
Philosophers of Classical Greece also constructed their own metaphysical cosmogonies, with their own primordial deities:

- Pherecydes of Syros (c. 600–550 BC), in his Heptamychia, wrote that there were three divine principles, who came before all things, and who have always existed: Zas (Ζάς, Zeus), Cthonie (Χθονίη, Earth), and Chronos (Χρόνος, Time).
- Empedocles (c. 490–430 BC) wrote that there were four elements which ultimately make up everything: fire, air, water, and earth. He said that there were two divine powers, Philotes (Love) and Neikos (Strife), who wove the universe out of these elements.
- Plato (c. 428–347 BC) introduced (in Timaeus) the concept of the demiurge, who had modeled the universe on the Ideas.

== Interpretation of primordial deities ==
Scholars dispute the meaning of the primordial deities in the poems of Homer and Hesiod. Since the primordials give birth to the Titans, and the Titans give birth to the Olympians, one way of interpreting the primordial gods is as the deepest and most fundamental nature of the cosmos.

For example, Jenny Strauss Clay argues that Homer's poetic vision centers on the reign of Zeus, but that Hesiod's vision of the primordials put Zeus and the Olympians in context. Likewise, Vernant argues that the Olympic pantheon is a "system of classification, a particular way of ordering and conceptualizing the universe by distinguishing within it various types of powers and forces." But even before the Olympic pantheon were the Titans and primordial gods. Homer alludes to a more tumultuous past before Zeus was the undisputed King and Father.

Mitchell Miller argues that the first four primordial deities arise in a highly significant relationship. He argues that Chaos represents differentiation, since Chaos differentiates (separates, divides) Tartarus and Earth. Even though Chaos is "first of all" for Hesiod, Miller argues that Tartarus represents the primacy of the undifferentiated, or the unlimited. Since undifferentiation is unthinkable, Chaos is the "first of all" in that he is the first thinkable being. In this way, Chaos (the principle of division) is the natural opposite of Eros (the principle of unification). Earth (light, day, waking, life) is the natural opposite of Tartarus (darkness, night, sleep, death). These four are the parents of all the other Titans.

== See also ==
- Bibliotheca (Pseudo-Apollodorus)
- Ex nihilo
- Family tree of the Greek gods
