= Phorcys =

Ancient Greek god of the sea

- Sea god
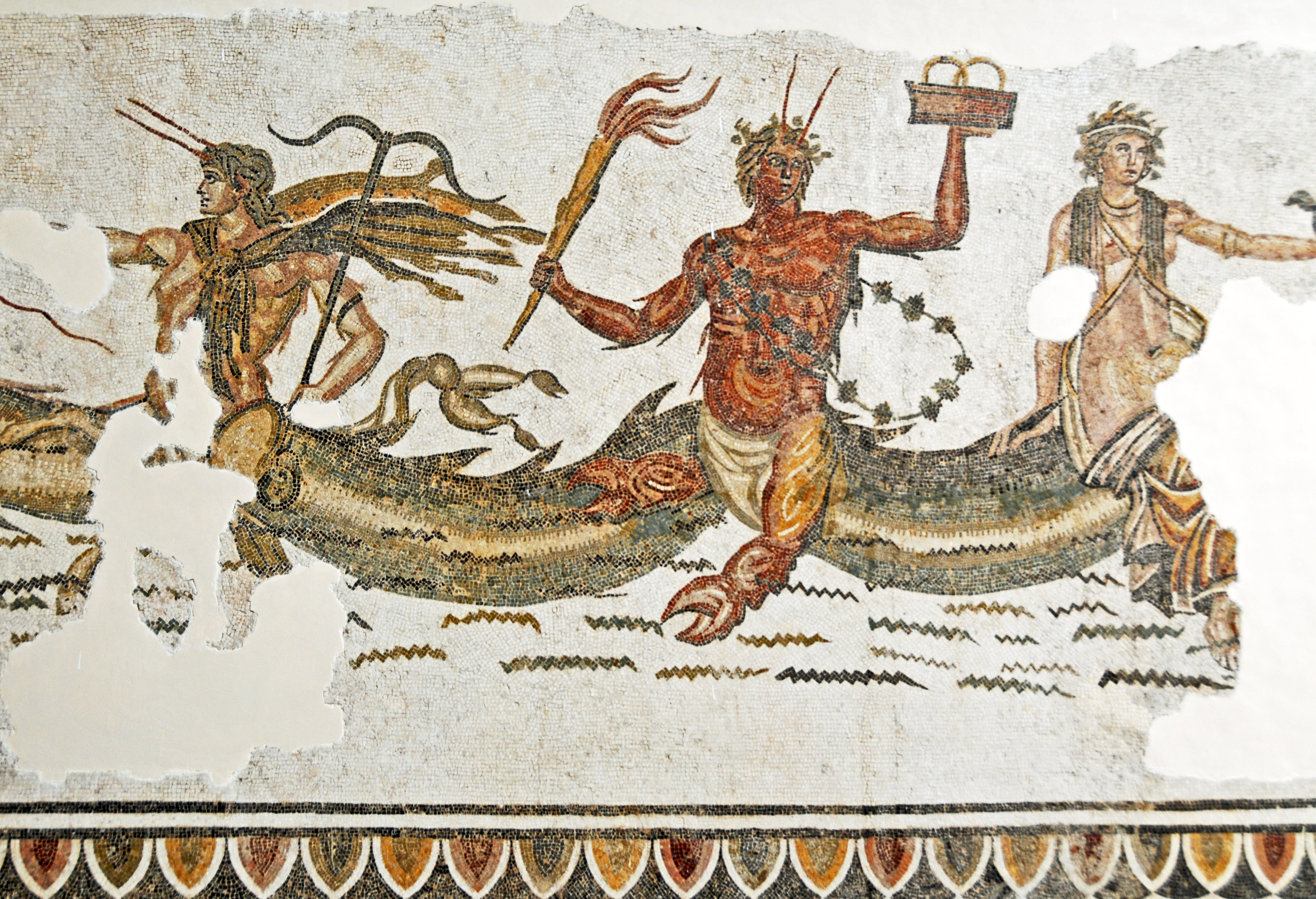
- Late Roman mosaic from the Trajan Baths of Acholla showing three aquatic deities: Phorcys (middle), Ceto (right), and Triton or Thaumas (left). Bardo National Museum, Tunis
- Abode: Sea

Genealogy
- Parents: Pontus and Gaia
- Siblings: Nereus, Thaumas, Ceto and Eurybia
- Consort: Ceto
- Children: The Hesperides, the Gorgons, the Graeae, Thoosa, Scylla, Echidna, the Sirens, and Ladon

In Greek mythology, Phorcys or Phorcus (/ˈfɔːrsɪs/; Ancient Greek: Φόρκυς, romanized: Phórkys, lit. 'white' or 'seal') is a primordial sea god, generally cited (first in Hesiod) as the son of Pontus and Gaia (Earth). Classical scholar Karl Kerenyi conflated Phorcys with the similar sea gods Nereus and Proteus. His wife was Ceto, and he is most notable in myth for fathering by Ceto a host of monstrous children. In extant Hellenistic-Roman mosaics, Phorcys was depicted as a fish-tailed merman with crab-claw legs and red, spiky skin.

According to Servius, commentator on the Aeneid, who reports a very ancient version already reflected in Varro, distinct from the Greek vulgate: Phorcos was once king of Sardinia and Corsica; annihilated in a naval battle in the Tyrrhenian Sea, and then shot down by King Atlas with a large part of his army, his companions imagined him transformed into a marine deity, perhaps a monster, half man and half sea ram.

== Parents ==
According to Hesiod's Theogony, Phorcys is the son of Pontus and Gaia, and the brother of Nereus, Thaumus, Ceto, and Eurybia. In a genealogy from Plato's dialogue Timaeus, Phorcys, Cronus and Rhea are the eldest offspring of Oceanus and Tethys.

== Offspring ==
Hesiod's Theogony lists the children of Phorcys and Ceto as the Graeae (naming only two: Pemphredo, and Enyo), the Gorgons (Stheno, Euryale and Medusa), probably Echidna (though the text is unclear on this point) and Ceto's "youngest, the awful snake who guards the apples all of gold in the secret places of the dark earth at its great bounds", also called the Drakon Hesperios ("Hesperian Dragon", or dragon of the Hesperides) or Ladon. These children tend to be consistent across sources, though Ladon is often cited as a child of Echidna by Typhon and therefore Phorcys and Ceto's grandson.

According to Apollodorus, Scylla was the daughter of Crataeis, with the father being either Trienus (Triton?) or Phorcus (a variant of Phorkys). Apollonius of Rhodes has Scylla as the daughter of Phorcys and a conflated Crataeis-Hecate. Once, when Heracles killed Scylla during his labours, Phorcys brought her back to life with fire.

According to a fragment of Sophocles, Phorcys is the father of the Sirens.

The scholiast on Apollonius of Rhodes cites Phorcys and Ceto as the parents of the Hesperides, but this assertion is not repeated in other ancient sources.

Homer refers to Thoosa, the mother of Polyphemus, as a daughter of Phorcys, with no mother specified.
