= Ourea =

Greek mountain deities

In Greek mythology, the Ourea (Ancient Greek: Οὔρεα, romanized: Oúrea, lit. 'mountains', plural of Ancient Greek: Οὖρος, romanized: Oûros, or 'Oûros') were the parthenogenetic offspring of Gaia (Earth), produced alongside Uranus (Sky), and Pontus (Sea).

According to Hesiod:

And [Gaia] brought forth long hills [Οὔρεα], graceful haunts
of the goddess Nymphs who dwell amongst the glens of the hills.

Defined by Middle Liddell as from οὖρος "mountain, hill; mule; a guard."
