= Thoosa =

Nymph in Greek mythology

In Greek mythology, Thoosa (/θoʊˈoʊsə/, Ancient Greek: Θόωσα, romanized: Thóōsa), also spelled Thoösa, was, according to Homer, the sea nymph daughter of the primordial sea god Phorcys. By Poseidon, she is the mother of the Cyclops Polyphemus.
