= Ladon (mythology) =

Dragon in Greek mythology

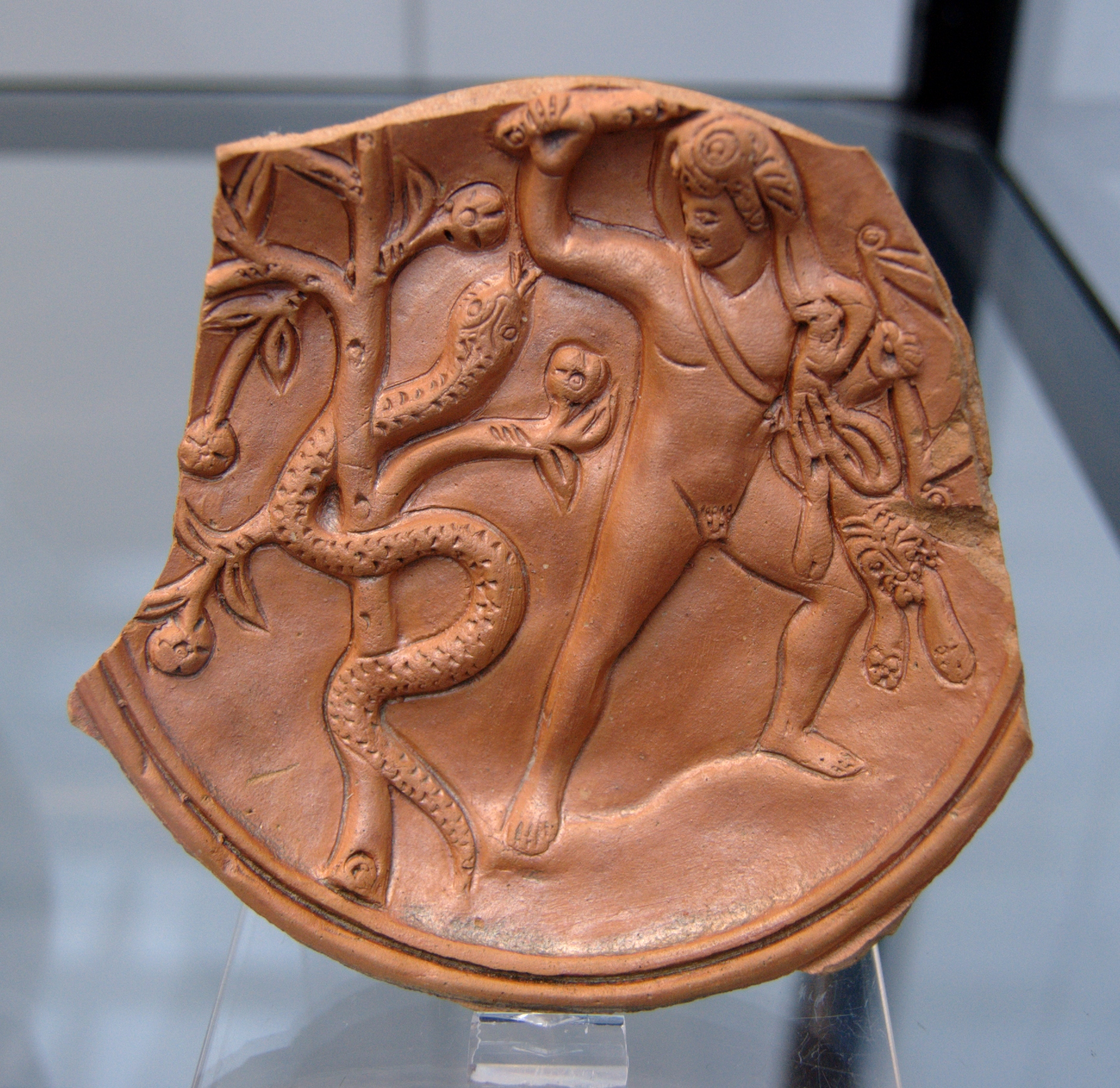
Heracles and Ladon, Roman relief plate, late era.

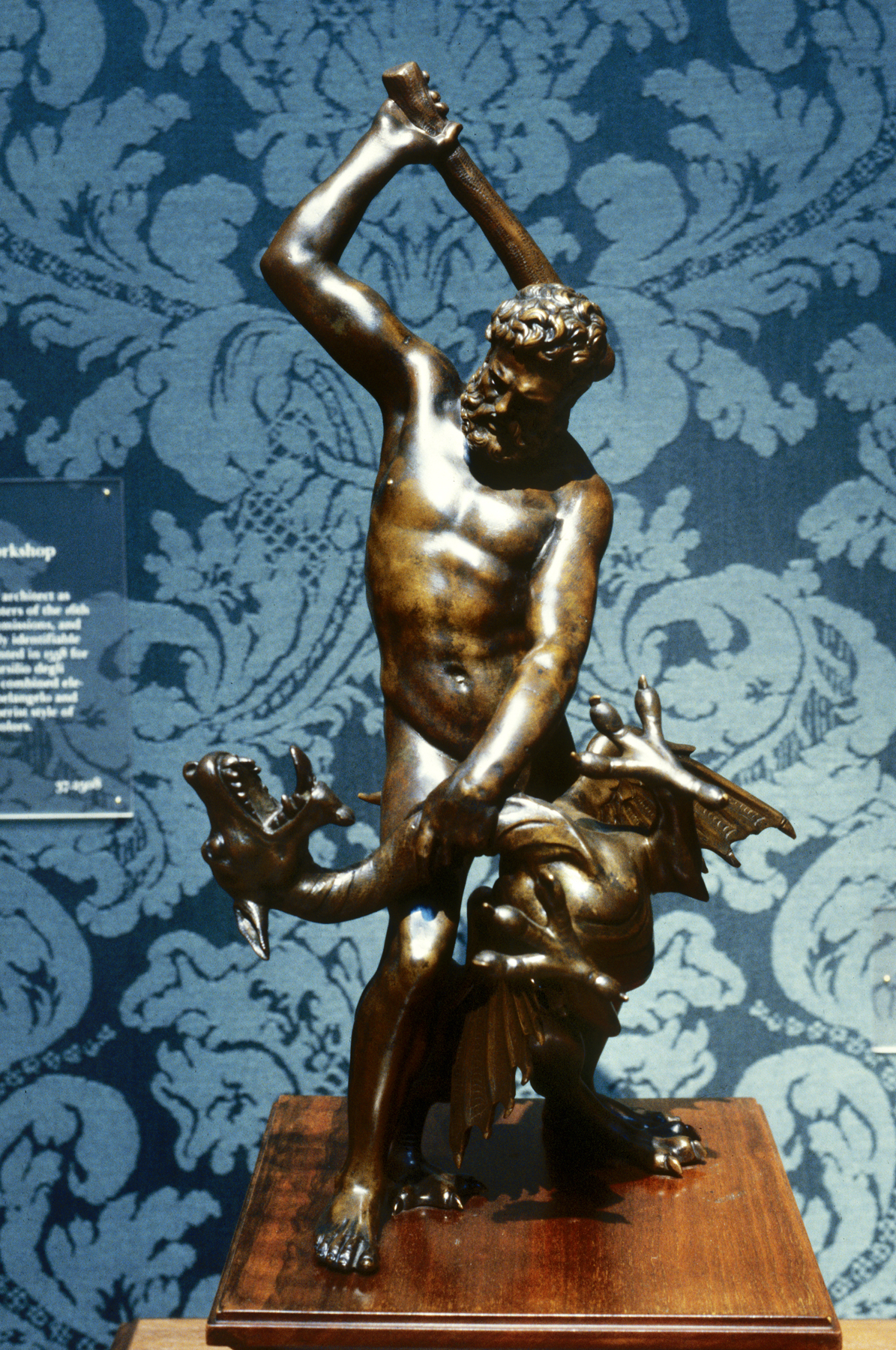
Hercules and the Dragon Ladon, from the workshop of Giambologna, early 17th century (Walters Art Museum).

Ladon (/ˈleɪdən/; Ancient Greek: Λάδων; gen.: Λάδωνος Ladonos) was a dragon in Greek mythology, who guarded the golden apples in the Garden of the Hesperides.

== Family ==
According to Hesiod's Theogony, Ladon was the last of the progeny of Phorcys and Ceto. A scholion on Apollonius of Rhodes' Argonautica, however, cites Hesiod as calling him the son of Typhon, and the same scholion on Apollonius of Rhodes claims that one "Peisandros" called Ladon born of the earth. The mythographer Apollodorus calls Ladon the offspring of the monstrous Typhon and Echidna, a parentage repeated by Hyginus and Pherecydes; similarly, Ladon is called the son of Typhon in Tzetzes' Chiliades.

According to Ptolemy Hephaestion's New History, as recorded by Photius in his Bibliotheca, Ladon was the brother of the Nemean lion.

== Mythology ==
Ladon was the serpent-like dragon that twined and twisted around the tree in the Garden of the Hesperides and guarded the golden apples. In pursuance of his eleventh labour, Heracles killed Ladon with a bow and arrow and carried the apples away. The following day, Jason and the Argonauts passed by on their chthonic return journey from Colchis, hearing the lament of "shining" Aegle, one of the four Hesperides, and viewing the still-twitching Ladon. In an alternate version of the myth, Ladon is never slain, and Heracles instead gets the Titan god Atlas to retrieve the apples. At the same time, Heracles takes Atlas’ place, holding up the sky.

The dragon (Ladon) image coiled around the tree, originally adopted by the Hellenes from Near Eastern and Minoan sources, is familiar from surviving Greek vase-painting. In the 2nd century CE, Pausanias saw among the treasuries at Olympia an archaic cult image in cedar-wood of Heracles and the apple-tree of the Hesperides with the snake coiled around it.

Diodorus Siculus gives an euhemerist interpretation of Ladon, as a human shepherd guarding a flock of golden-fleeced sheep, adding, "But with regards to such matters it will be every man's privilege to form such opinions as accord with his own belief."

According to the Astronomy attributed to Hyginus, Ladon is the constellation Draco which was placed among the stars by Zeus. Pseudo-Apollodorus wrote that he had a hundred heads and spoke with many diverse voices (Bibliotheca 2.5.11).

== See also ==
- Lernaean Hydra, a similar monster who was also slain by Heracles.
