= Gaia =

Personification of the Earth in Greek mythology

- Personification of the Earth
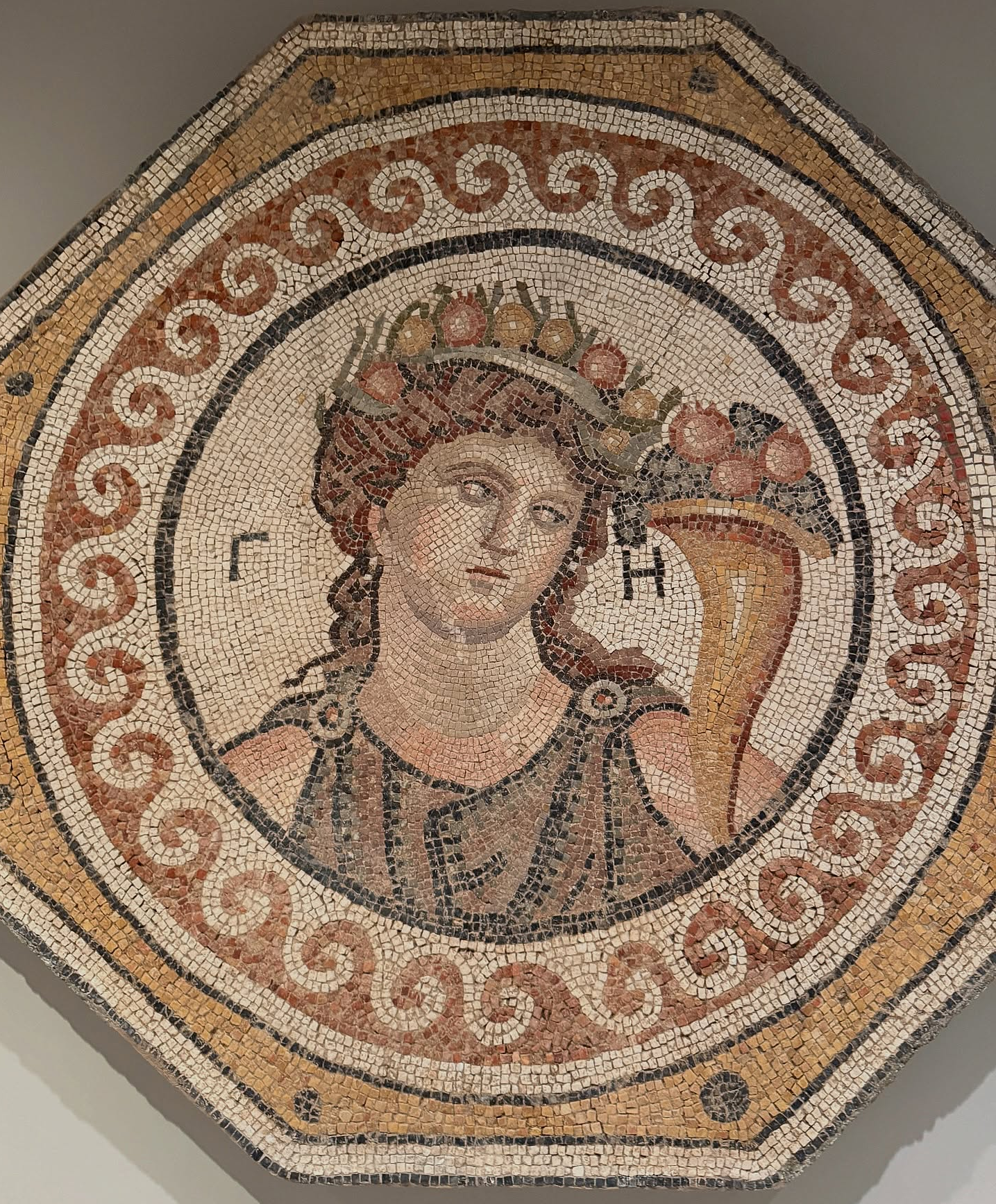
- Mosaic depicting Gaia, excavated at Antioch, dating to the mid-2nd century CE. The mosaic is now in the collection of the Princeton University Art Museum, United States.
- Other names: Ge; Gaea; Chthon
- Greek: Γαῖα, Γῆ
- Symbol: Fruit
- Parents: None (Hesiod)
- Consort: Uranus
- Offspring: Uranus, Pontus, the Ourea, the Hecatonchires, the Cyclopes, the Titans, the Gigantes, Nereus, Thaumus, Phorcys, Ceto, Eurybia, Tritopatores, Typhon

Equivalents
- Etruscan: Cel
- Roman: Terra

In Greek mythology, Gaia (/ˈɡeɪ.ə, ˈɡaɪ.ə/; Ancient Greek: Γαῖα, romanized: Gaîa, a poetic form of Γῆ (Gê), meaning 'land' or 'earth'), also spelled Gaea (/ˈdʒiː.ə/), is the personification of Earth. She is the mother of Uranus (Sky), with whom she conceived the Titans (themselves parents of many of the Olympian gods), the Cyclopes, and the Giants, as well as of Pontus (Sea), from whose union she bore the primordial sea gods. Her equivalent in the Roman pantheon was Terra.

== Etymology ==
The Greek name Γαῖα (Gaîa, Ancient Greek: [ɡâi̯.a]) is a mostly epic, collateral form of Attic Γῆ (Gê, [ɡɛ̂ː]), and Doric Γᾶ (Gâ, [ɡâː]), perhaps identical to Δᾶ (Dâ, [dâː]), both meaning "Earth". Beekes suggested a Pre-Greek origin. M.L. West derives the name from the Indo-European form *dʰéǵʰōm (earth). Greek: gaia (<*gm̥-ya), khamaí (χαμαί) on the earth, Hittite: tekan, Tocharian: tkam, Phrygian zemelo, Proto-Slavonic:*zem-yã, Avestan: za (locative: zemi), Vedic: ksam, Latin: hum-us, Albanian: dhé.

In Mycenean Greek, Ma-ka (probably transliterated as Ma-ga, "Mother Gaia") also contains the root ga-.

== Mythology ==
=== Hesiod ===
==== Birth of Gaia, Uranus, and the Titans ====
Hesiod's Theogony tells how, after Chaos, "wide-bosomed" Gaia (Earth) arose to be the everlasting seat of the immortals who possess Olympus above. And after Gaia came "dim Tartarus in the depth of the wide-pathed Earth", and next Eros the god of love. Hesiod goes on to say that Gaia brought forth her equal Uranus (Sky) to "cover her on every side". Gaia also bore the Ourea (Mountains), and Pontus (Sea), "without sweet union of love" (i.e., with no father).

Afterward, with Uranus, her son, she gave birth to the Titans, as Hesiod tells it:

She lay with Heaven and bore deep-swirling Oceanus, Coeus and Crius and Hyperion and Iapetus, Theia and Rhea, Themis, and Mnemosyne and gold-crowned Phoebe and lovely Tethys. After them was born Cronos (Cronus) the wily, youngest, and most terrible of her children, and he hated his lusty sire.

==== Other offspring and the castration of Uranus ====
According to Hesiod, Gaia conceived further offspring with her son, Uranus, first the giant one-eyed Cyclopes: Brontes ("Thunder"), Steropes ("Lightning"), and Arges ("Bright"); then the Hecatonchires: Cottus, Briareos, and Gyges, each with a hundred arms and fifty heads. As each of the Cyclopes and Hecatonchires were born, Uranus hid them in a secret place within Gaia, causing her great pain. So Gaia devised a plan. She created a grey flint (or adamantine) sickle. And Cronus used the sickle to castrate his father Uranus as he approached his mother, Gaia, to have sex with her. From Uranus' spilled blood, Gaia produced the Erinyes, the Giants, and the Meliae (ash-tree nymphs). From the testicles of Uranus in the sea came forth Aphrodite.

By her son, Pontus, Gaia bore the sea-deities Nereus, Thaumas, Phorcys, Ceto, and Eurybia.

==== Titanomachy ====
Because Cronus had learned from Gaia and Uranus that he was destined to be overthrown by one of his children, he swallowed each of the children born to him by his Titan older sister, Rhea. But when Rhea was pregnant with her youngest child, Zeus, she sought help from Gaia and Uranus. When Zeus was born, Rhea gave Cronus a stone she received from Gaia wrapped in swaddling-clothes in his place, which Cronus swallowed, and Gaia took Zeus into her care.

With the help of Gaia's advice, Zeus defeated the Titans. But afterwards, Gaia, in union with Tartarus, bore the youngest of her sons Typhon, who would be the last challenge to the authority of Zeus.

=== Other sources ===
According to the Roman mythographer Hyginus, Terra (Earth, the Roman equivalent of Gaia), Caelus (Sky, the Roman equivalent of Uranus) and Mare (Sea) are the children of Aether and Dies (Day, the Roman equivalent of Hemera). With Aether, Terra produces Dolor (Pain), Dolus (Deception), Ira (Anger), Luctus (Mourning), Mendacium (Lying), Iusiurandum (Oath), Vltio (Vengeance), Intemperantia (Self-indulgence), Altercatio (Quarreling), Oblivio (Forgetfulness), Socordia (Sloth), Timor (Fear), Superbia (Arrogance), Incestum (Incest), Pugna (Fighting), Oceanus (Ocean), Themis, Tartarus, Pontus, the Titans, Briareus, Gyges, Steropes, Atlas, Hyperion, Polus, Saturn, Ops, Moneta, Dione, and the Furies (Alecto, Megaera, and Tisiphone). By Tartarus, Terra then becomes the mother of the Giants, which are listed as Enceladus, Coeus, Ophion, Astraeus, Pelorus, Pallas, Emphytus, Rhoecus, Ienios, Agrius, Palaemon, Ephialtes, Eurytus, Theomises, Theodamas, Otos, Typhon, Polybotes, Menephiarus, Abseus, Colophomus, and Iapetus. According to the mythographer Apollodorus, however, Gaia and Tartarus were the parents of Echidna.

Diodorus Siculus recounts a legend that Gaia was a human woman named Titaea, one of the wives of Uranus, who in this telling was also originally a human and the first king of Atlantis. According to this story, Titaea was deified after her death and her name changed to "Gê."

The Apples of the Hesperides that Heracles was tasked by Eurystheus to take were a wedding gift by Gaia to Zeus and Hera.

When Zeus decided to end the Bronze Age with the great deluge, Deucalion and Pyrrha were the only human survivors. Even though he was imprisoned, Prometheus who could see the future and had foreseen the coming of this flood, told Deucalion, to build an ark and, thus, they survived by landing on Mount Parnassus, the only place spared by the flood. Once the deluge was over and the couple were on land again, Deucalion consulted the oracle of Themis about how to repopulate the earth. He was told to throw the bones of his mother behind his shoulder. Deucalion and Pyrrha understood the "mother" to be Gaia, the mother of all living things, and the "bones" to be rocks. They threw the rocks behind their shoulders, which soon began to lose their hardness and change form. Their mass grew greater, and the beginnings of human form emerged. The parts that were soft and moist became skin, the veins of the rock became people's veins, and the hardest parts of the rocks became bones. The stones thrown by Pyrrha became women; those thrown by Deucalion became men.

Gaia resented the way Zeus had treated her children, the Titans, so she brought forth the Gigantes to fight Zeus. It was prophesied that the Gigantes, who were born from Uranus's blood, could not be killed by the gods alone, but they could be killed with the help of a mortal. Hearing this, Gaia sought for a certain plant that would protect the Gigantes even from mortals. Before Gaia or anyone else could get it, Zeus forbade Eos (Dawn), Selene (Moon) and Helios (Sun) to shine, harvested all of the plant himself, and had Athena summon the mortal Heracles, who assisted the Olympians in defeating the Gigantes.

Towards the end of the Heroic Age, Gaia found that humanity had become too numerous and too impious. Mankind weighed her down, so she asked Zeus to relieve her of the burden. To reduce the human population, Zeus planned the Theban Wars and the Trojan War.

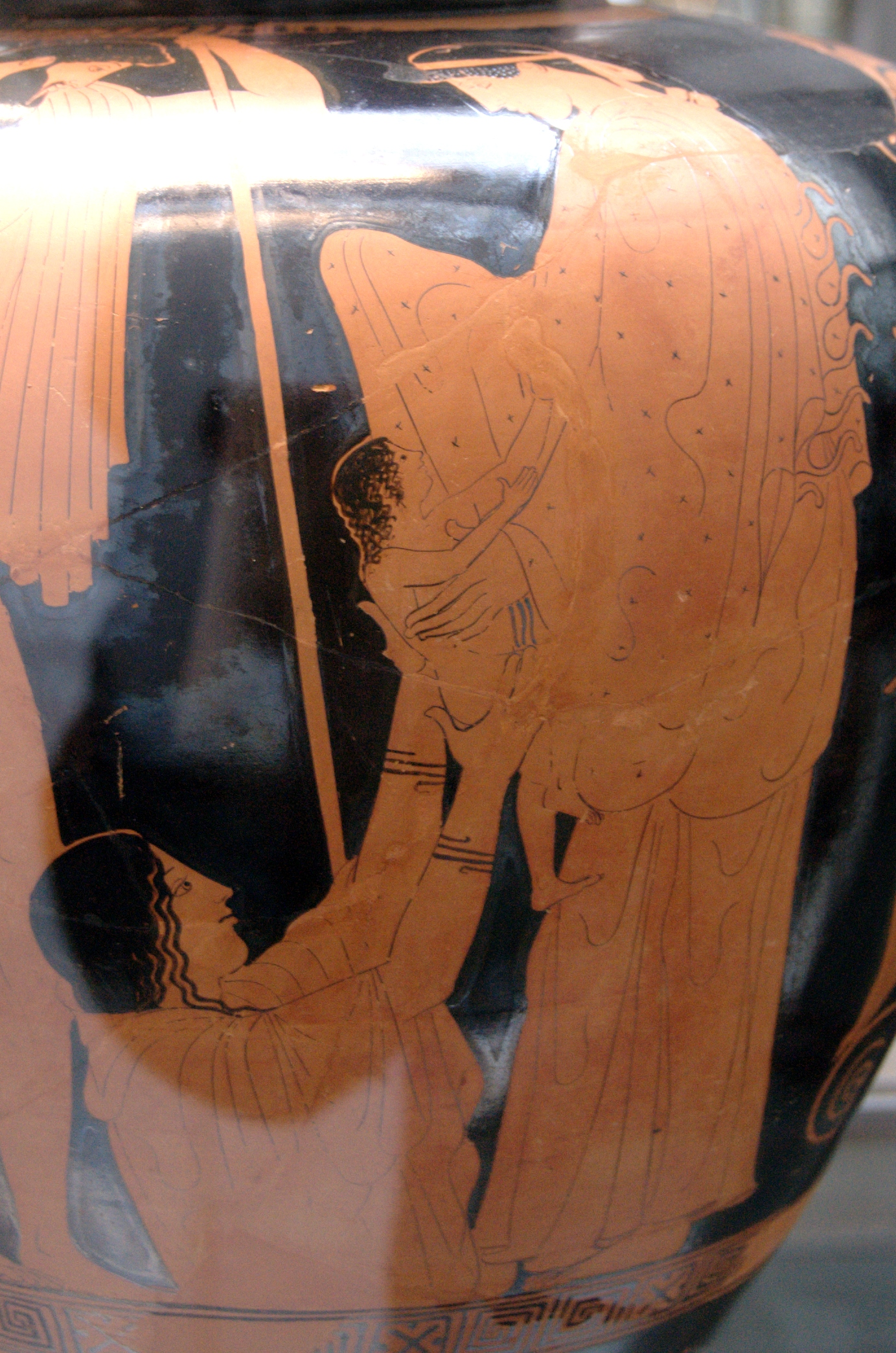
Gaia hands her newborn, Erichthonius, to Athena as Hephaestus watches – an Attic red-figure stamnos, 470–460 BC

The god Hephaestus once attempted to rape Athena, but she pushed him away, causing him to ejaculate on her thigh. Athena wiped off the semen and threw it on the ground, which impregnated Gaia. Gaia then gave birth to Erichthonius of Athens, whom Athena adopted as her own child.

Nonnus describes a similar myth, in which Aphrodite fled from her lustful father Zeus, who was infatuated with her. As Zeus was unable to catch Aphrodite, he gave up and dropped his semen on the ground, which impregnated Gaia. This resulted in the birth of the Cyprian Centaurs.

According to little-known myth, Elaea was an accomplished athlete from Attica who was killed by her fellow athletes, because they had grown envious of her and her skills; but Gaia turned her into an olive tree as a reward, for Athena's sake. Gaia also turned the young Libanus into rosemary when he was killed by impious people.

According to Hesiod, in his lost poem Astronomia, Orion, while hunting with Artemis and her mother Leto, claimed that he would kill every animal on earth. Gaia, angered by his boasting, sent a giant scorpion to kill him, and after his death, he and the scorpion were placed among the stars by Zeus. According to Ovid, Gaia for some reason sent the scorpion to kill Leto instead, and Orion was killed trying to protect her.

When Boreas, the god of the north wind, killed Pitys, an Oread nymph, for rejecting his advances and preferring Pan over him, Gaia pitied the dead girl and transformed her into a pine tree.

Zeus hid Elara, one of his lovers, from Hera by stowing her under the earth. His son by Elara, the giant Tityos, is therefore sometimes said to be a son of Gaia, the earth goddess.

Gaia made Aristaeus immortal for the benefits he bestowed upon humanity.

== Cult ==
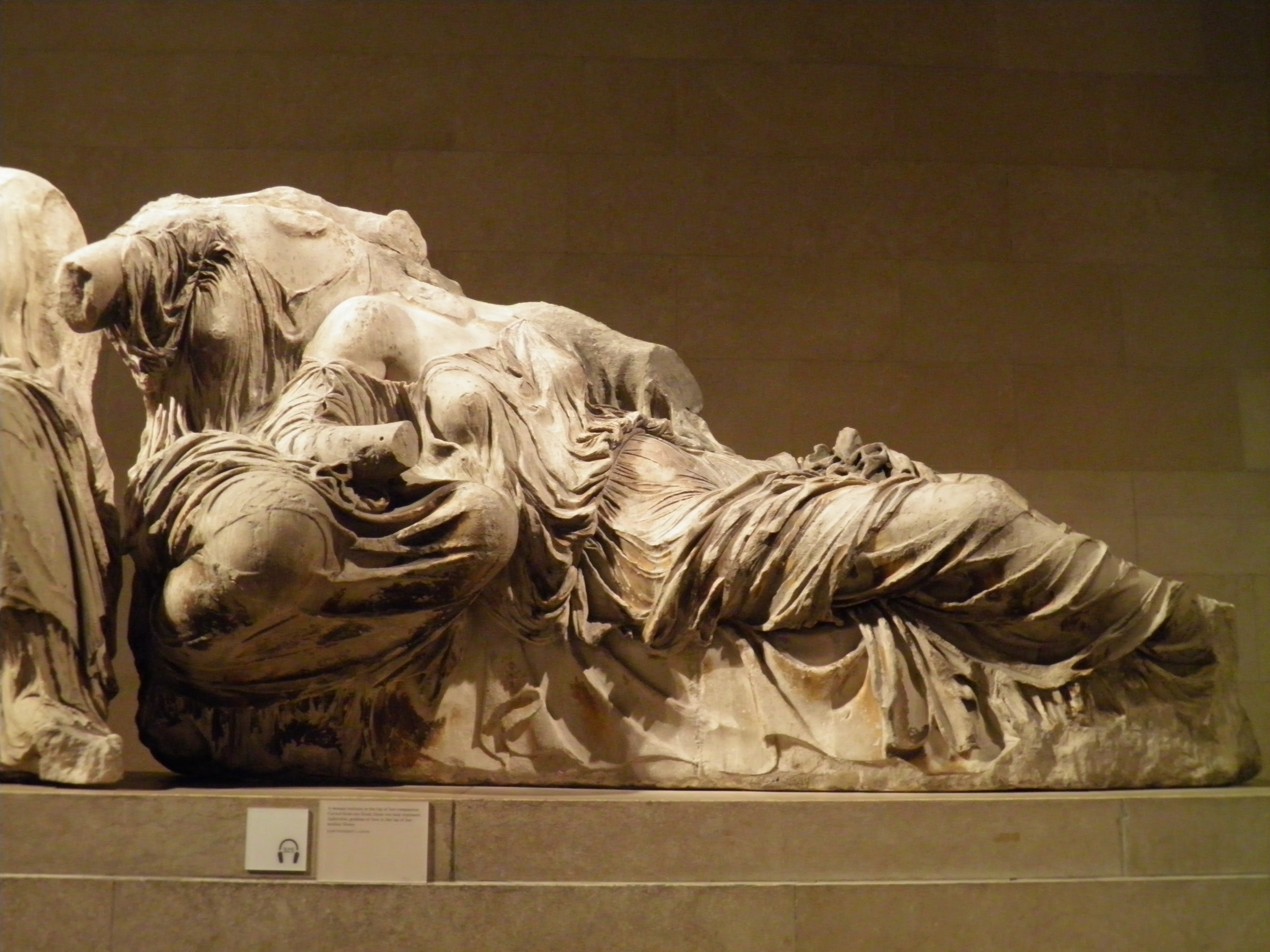
Although typically associated with Dione and Aphrodite, one interpretation holds that these sculptures from the east pediment of the Parthenon depict Thalassa (the Sea) in the lap of Gaia; c. 438-432 BC, British Museum.

It seems that the worship of the "earth" was indigenous in Greece. However it is doubtful if the mother-religion is rooted to the Pre-Greek population. In classical times Ge was not an important deity and she didn't have any festivals. She was usually honoured together with other gods or goddesses. Local cults of Gaia are rare and only some of them can be mentioned from the existing evidence.

Elements of a primitive cult of Gaia appear at Dodona in Epirus. It seems that in an old religion the earth goddess was worshipped together with the sky-god (Zeus). At Thebes there was cult of "Gaia Makaira Telesforos". Telesforos means "bringing fruits to perfection". The earth goddess had powers over the ghosts and the dreams which come from the underworld, therefore she acquired oracular powers. These conceptions are evident in her cults at Delphi, Athens and Aigai of Achaea. An inscription "ieron eurysternou" (sanctuary of the broad-bosomed), is mentioned at Delphi by Mnaseas. A temple of Ge was built to the south of the temple of Apollo. "Eutysternos" is a surname of Ge and it had an earlier use by Hesiod. It was also given to her in her worship at the Achaean Aegai.

In Eumenides, the priestess announced her first prayers to "Gaia the first prophetess". At Aegai there was a very old image of the earth-goddess, and the service was in the hands of a virgin woman. The serpent represented the earth deity and was related to the chthonic oracular cult. This is evident at Delphi. Traditionally the oracle belonged originally to Poseidon and Ge and the serpent Python represents the earth spirit. Ge was probably present at the oracle of Trophonius at Livadeia. The prophecies were usually given by the priestesses and not by the goddess. At Olympia her altar was called "Gaios". The altars were given the name of a deity in primitive stages of religion. At Olympia like in Dodona it seems that she was honoured together with the sky-god Zeus. At Aigai she had an oracular power. According to Pliny the priestess drank a small quantity of the blood of a bull before entering the secret cave. At Patras in the oracle of "Ge", a sacred well was used for predicting the cause of diseases. At Athens Ge acquired the cult-title Themis. Themis was an oracular goddess related to Ge and she was not originally interpreted as goddess of righteousness.

The cult of Gaia was probably indigenous in Attica. In the cult of Phlya, Pausanias reports that there were altars to Dionysos, certain nymphs and to Ge, whom they called the "great goddess". The Great goddess is interpreted as "Mother of the gods" who is a form of Gaia. It seems that a mystery-cult was related to the Great-goddess. An inscription on the Acropolis of Athens refers to the practice of service in honour of "Ge-Karpophoros" (bringer of fruits) in accordance with the oracle. The oracle was probably Delphic. A sanctuary on the Acropolis was the "Kourotrophion", and the earlier inscriptions mentions simply "The Kourotrophos" (nourisher of children). Pausanias mentions a double shrine of "Ge-Kourotrophos" and "Demeter-Chloe" on the Acropolis. Near the Olympieion of Athens there was the temenos of Ge-Olympia. Thucydides mentions that it was among the oldest sanctuaries built in Athens, where the Deucalion flood took place. A chthonic ritual was performed in Athens in honour of Ge. The Genesia was a mourning festival in the month Broedromion. A sacrifice was performed to Ge, and the citizents brought offerings to the graves of the dead.

An ancient Gaia cult existed at the "Marathonian Tetrapolis" near Athens . In the month Poseideon a pregnant cow was sacrificed to "Ge in the acres" and in Gamelion a sheep to" Ge-near the oracle". Both sacrifices were followed by rituals and the second was related to Daeira a divinity connected with the Eleusinian mysteries. At Eleusis Ge received a premilinary offering among other gods. Ge was associated with the dead at Mykonos. Seven black lambs were offered to "Zeus Chthonios" and "Ge-Chthonia" in the month Lenaion. The worshippers were offered to feast at the place of worship. At Sparta Gaia was worshipped together with Zeus. There was a double shrine of "Ge" and "Zeus Agoraios" (of the market place).

=== Epithets ===
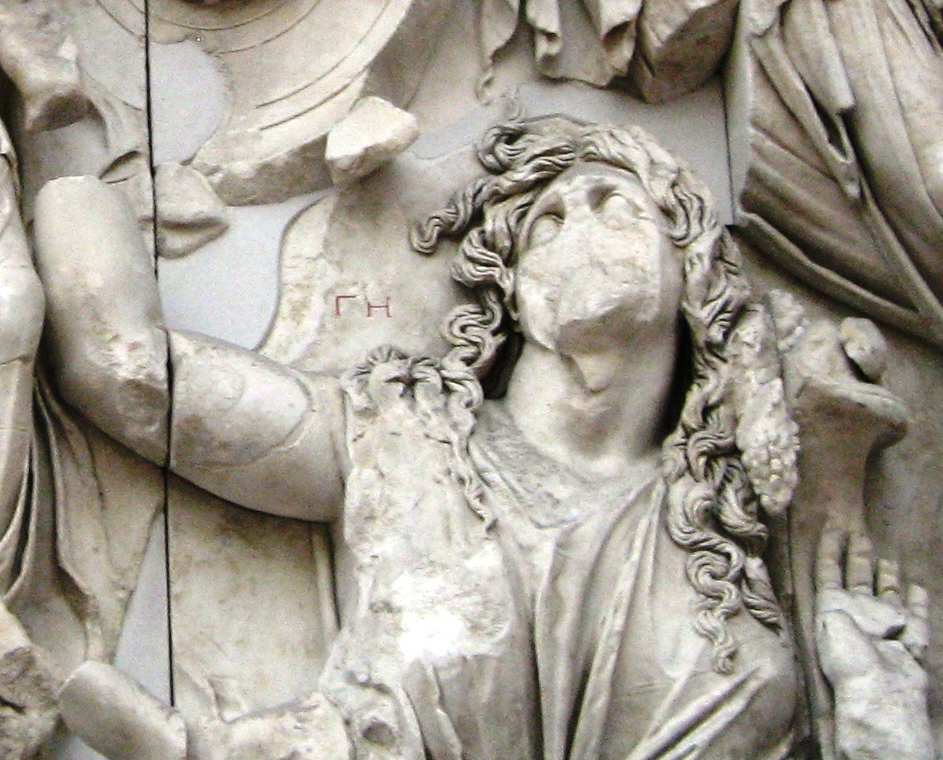
Gaia pleading for her sons the Gigantes (Giants), detail of the Gigantomachy frieze, Pergamon Altar, Pergamon museum, Berlin

Gaia has several epithets and attributes. In poetry chthon frequently has the same meaning with gaia. Some of her epithets are similar in some Indo-European languages. The universitality of the goddess is expressed by the prefix pan,(πάν). Some of the epithets of Gaia and Demeter are similar showing the identity of their nature.

- Anēsidora (ἀνησιδώρα), sending up gifts.
- Chthonia (χθονία) in Myconos.Pherecydes uses the name Chthonie, for the primeval goddess who became Ge:.
- Eurysternos (εὐρύστερνος): broad breasted. Earth is the broad seat of all immortals (Hesiod).
- Euryedeus (εὐρυεδεύς): broad seated.
- Karpophoros (καρποφόρος), bringer of fruits.
- Kalligeneia (καλλιγένεια), born beautiful.
- Kourotrophos (κουροτρόφος) :protector of young children, in Athens.
- Megali theos (Μεγάλη θεός) : Great goddess, in the mysteries of Phlya.
- Melaina (μελαίνα): black, in epic poetry.
- Olympia near the Olympeion of Athens.
- Pamphoros, (πάμφορος):all-bearing. The offspring of all.
- Pammētōr(παμμήτωρ) :mother of all
- Pammēteira(παμμήτειρα) :mother of all.
- Pamvōtis (παμβώτις) : all-nurturing.
- Pandōros (πάνδωρος) :plentiful, giver of all.
- Pheresvios (φερέσβιος)bringing forth life.
- Polivoteira (πουλυβότειρα): much nurturing.
- Themis (Θέμις) in Attica.
- Vathykolpos (βαθύκολπος): with deep, full breasts.

=== Temples ===
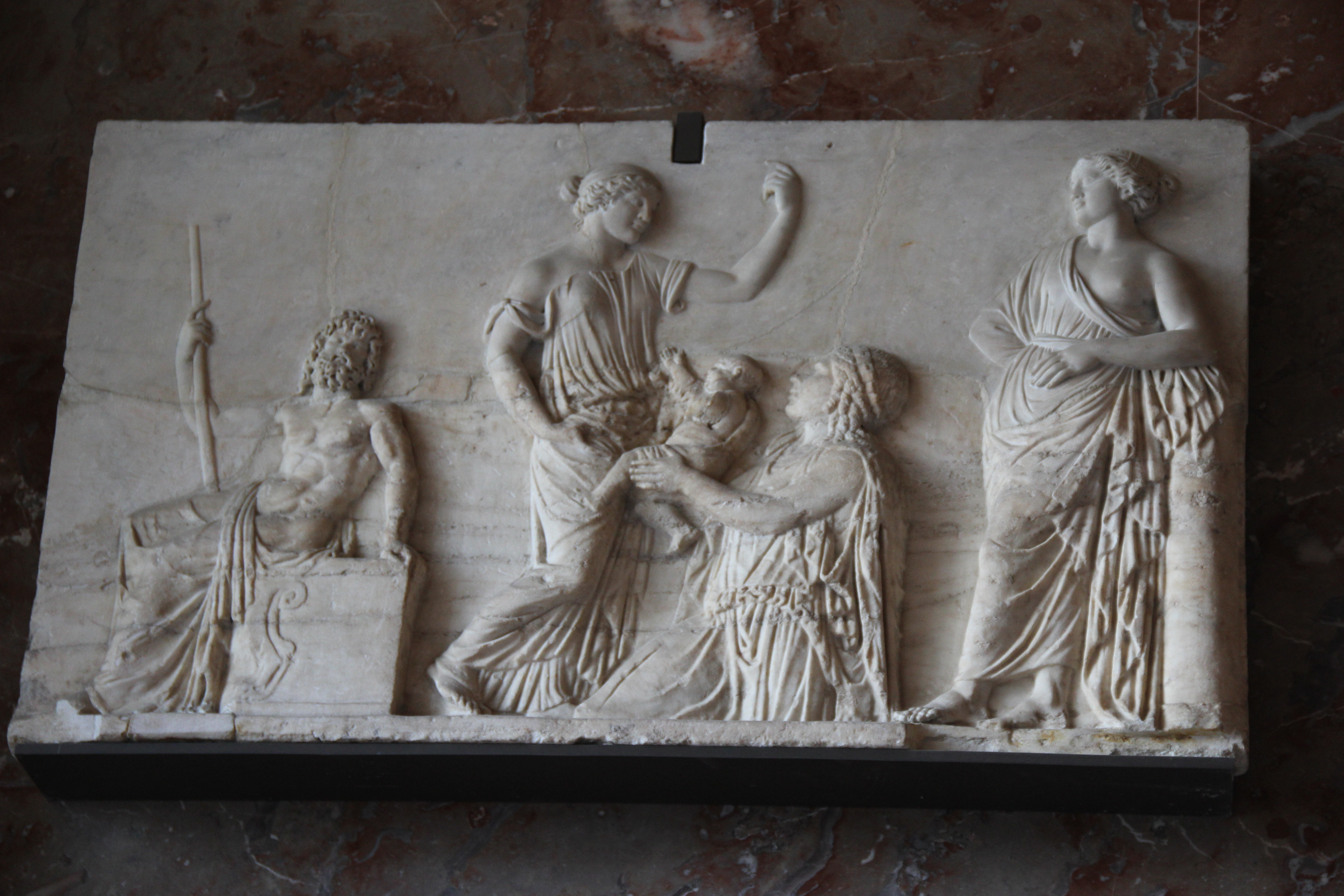
Gaia entrusts Erichthonios to Athena. From left to right: Hephaestus, Athena, Erichthonios, Gaia, Aphrodite. Said to come from the temple of Hephaestus in Athens. Pentelic marble. 100–150 AD. Louvre

Gaia is believed by some sources to be the original deity behind the Oracle at Delphi. It was thus said: "That word spoken from tree-clad mother Gaia's (Earth's) navel-stone [Omphalos]." Depending on the source, Gaia passed her powers on to Poseidon, Apollo, or Themis. Pausanias wrote:

Many and different are the stories told about Delphi, and even more so about the oracle of Apollo. For they say that in the earliest times the oracular seat belonged to Earth, who appointed as prophetess at it Daphnis, one of the nymphs of the mountain. There is extant among the Greeks an hexameter poem, the name of which is Eumolpia, and it is assigned to Musaeus, son of Antiophemus. In it the poet states that the oracle belonged to Poseidon and Earth in common; that Earth gave her oracles herself, but Poseidon used Pyrcon as his mouthpiece in giving responses. The verses are these: "Forthwith the voice of the Earth-goddess uttered a wise word, And with her Pyrcon, servant of the renowned Earth-shaker." They say that afterwards Earth gave her share to Themis, who gave it to Apollo as a gift. It is said that he gave to Poseidon Calaureia, that lies off Troezen, in exchange for his oracle.

Apollo is the best-known as the oracle power behind Delphi, long established by the time of Homer, having killed Gaia's child Python there and usurped the chthonic power. Hera punished Apollo for this by sending him to King Admetus as a shepherd for nine years. Gaia or Ge had at least three sanctuaries in Greece which were mentioned by Pausanias. There was a temple of Ge Eurusternos on the Crathis near Aegae in Achaia with "a very ancient statue":

It is a journey of about thirty stades [from the stream of Krathis (Crathis) near the ruins of Aigai (Aegae) in Akhaia] to what is called the Gaion (Gaeum), a sanctuary of Ge (Earth) surnamed Eurysternos (Broad-bossomed), whose wooden image is one of the very oldest. The woman who from time to time is priestess henceforth remains chaste and before her election must not have had intercourse with more than one man. The test applied is drinking bull's blood. Any woman who may chance not to speak the truth is immediately punished as a result of this test. If several women compete for the priesthood, lots are cast for the honor.

Pausanias also mention the sanctuary of Ge Gasepton in Sparta, and a sanctuary of Ge Kourotrophe (Nurse of the Young) at Athens. Aside from her temples, Gaia had altars as well as sacred spaces in the sanctuaries of other gods. Close to the sanctuary of Eileithyia in Tegea was an altar of Ge; Phlya and Myrrhinos had an altar to Ge under the name Thea Megale (Great goddess); as well as Olympia which additionally, similar to Delphi, also said to have had an oracle to Gaia:

On what is called the Gaion (Gaeum, Sanctuary of Ge) [at Olympia] is an altar of Ge (Earth); it too is of ashes. In more ancient days they say that there was an oracle also of Ge (Earth) in this place. On what is called the Stomion (Mouth) the altar to Themis has been built.

Her statues were naturally to be found in the temples of Demeter, such as the Temple of Demeter in Achaia: "They [the Patraians of Akhaia (Achaea)] have also a grove by the sea, affording in summer weather very agreeable walks and a pleasant means generally of passing the time. In this grove are also two temples of divinities, one of Apollon, the other of Aphrodite ... Next to the grove is a sanctuary of Demeter; she and her daughter [Persephone] are standing, but the image of Ge (Earth) is seated."

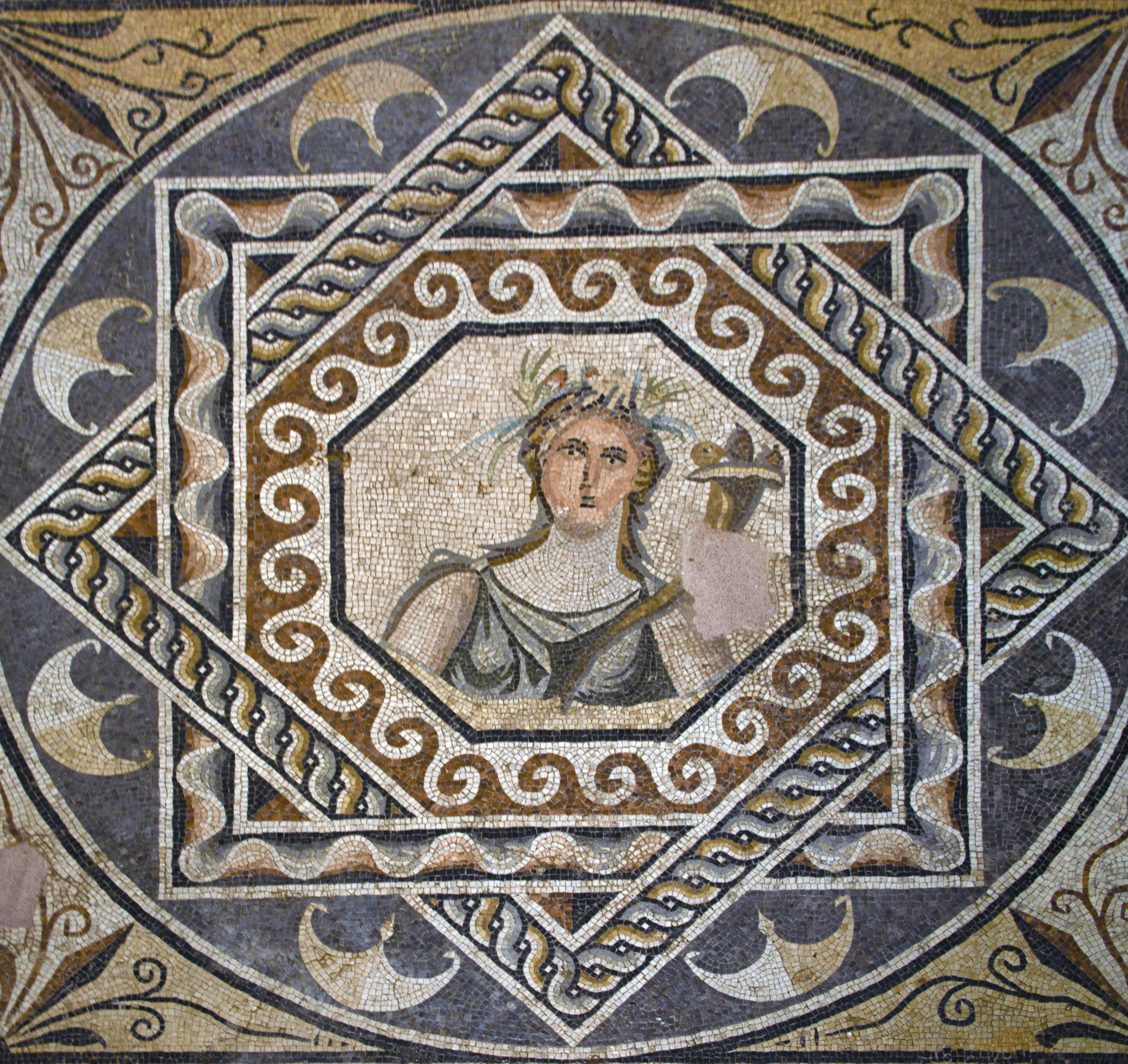
Gaia mosaic, 2nd century AD, Zeugma Mosaic Museum, Gaziantep

The Temple of Zeus Olympios in Athens reportedly had an enclosure of Ge Olympia:

[Within the sanctuary of Zeus Olympios in the lower town of Athens:] Within the precincts are antiquities: a bronze Zeus, a temple of Kronos (Cronus) and Rhea and an enclosure of Ge (Earth) surnamed Olympia. Here the floor opens to the width of a cubit, and they say that along this bed flowed off the water after the deluge that occurred in the time of Deukalion, and into it they cast every year wheat mixed with honey ... The ancient sanctuary of Zeus Olympios the Athenians say was built by Deukalion (Deucalion), and they cite as evidence that Deukalion lived at Athens a grave which is not far from the present temple.

In Athens, there was a statue of Gaia on the Acropolis depicting her beseeching Zeus for rain as well as an image of her close to the court of the Areopagos in Athens, alongside the statues of Plouton and Hermes, "by which sacrifice those who have received an acquittal on the Areopagos".

== Interpretations ==
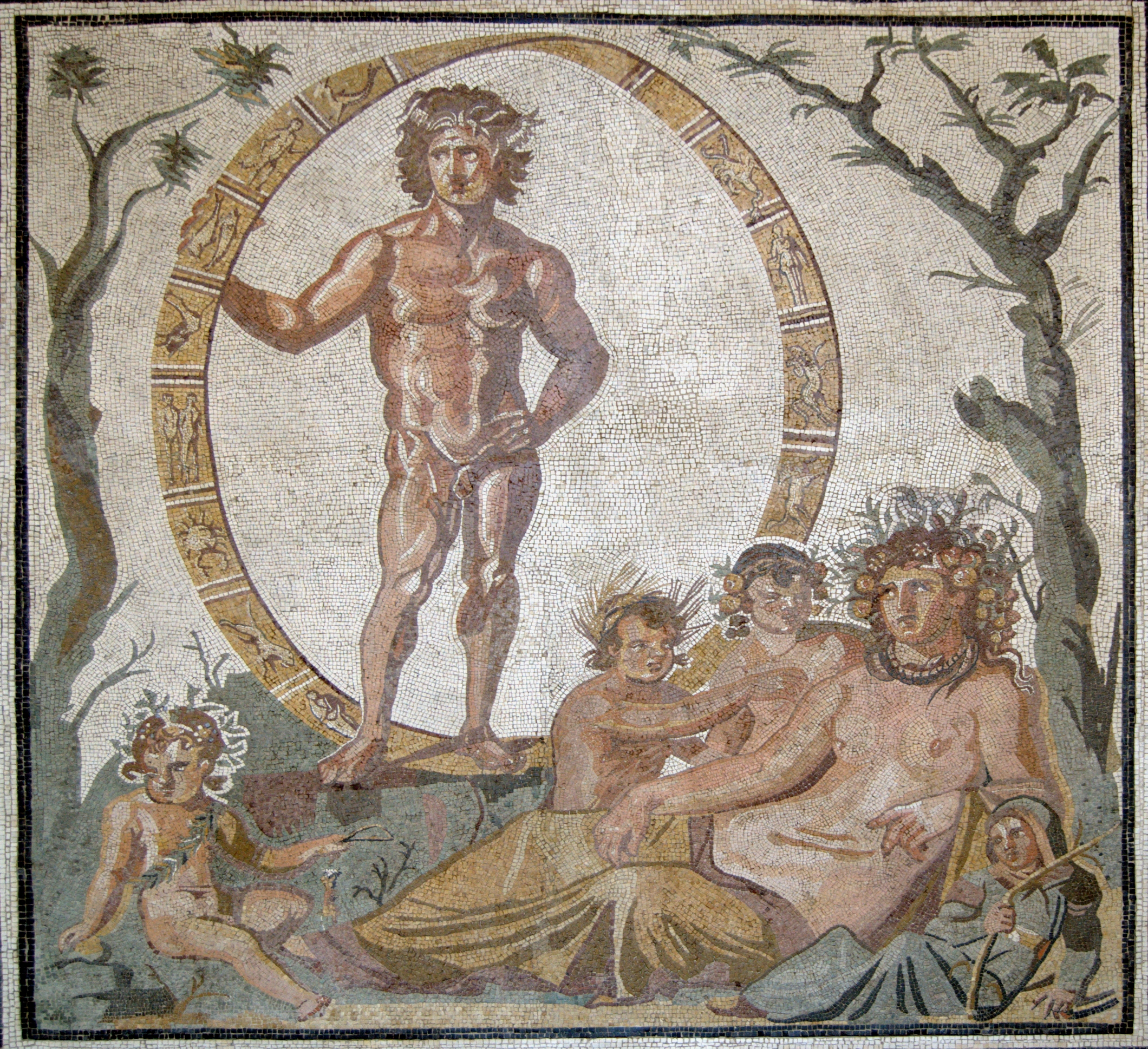
Aion and Tellus Mater with infant deities of the fruit of the seasons, in a mosaic from a Roman villa in Sentinum, first half of the third century BC (Munich Glyptothek, Inv. W504)

Some modern sources, such as Mellaart, Gimbutas, and Walker, claim that Gaia as Mother Earth is a later form of a pre-Indo-European Great Mother, venerated in Neolithic times. Her existence is a speculation and controversial in the academic community. Some modern mythographers, including Kerenyi, Ruck, and Staples, interpret the goddesses Demeter the "mother", Persephone the "daughter", and Hecate the "crone", as aspects of a former great goddess identified by some as Rhea or as Gaia herself. In Crete, a goddess was worshipped as Potnia Theron (the "Mistress of the Animals") or simply Potnia ("Mistress"), speculated as Rhea or Gaia; the title was later applied in Greek texts to Artemis. The mother goddess Cybele from Anatolia (modern Turkey) was partly identified by the Greeks with Gaia, but more so with Rhea.

== Modern paganism ==
Beliefs and worship amongst modern pagans (also known as neopagans) regarding Gaia vary, ranging from the belief that Gaia is the Earth to the belief that she is the spiritual embodiment of the earth or the goddess of the Earth.

== Family ==
=== Olympian descendants ===
Olympians' family tree

Uranus	Gaia
Uranus' genitals	Cronus	Rhea
Zeus	Hera	Poseidon	Hades	Demeter	Hestia
a
b
Ares	Hephaestus
Metis
Athena
Leto
Apollo	Artemis
Maia
Hermes
Semele
Dionysus
Dione
a	b
Aphrodite

=== Offspring ===
Gaia is the personification of the Earth, and these are her offspring as related in various myths. Some are related consistently, some are mentioned only in minor variants of myths, and others are related in variants that are considered to reflect a confusion of the subject or association.

Offspring and fathers
Father	Offspring (Hesiod)	Offspring (Other sources)
No father	Uranus, Pontus, The Ourea	The Autochthons: Cecrops, Palaechthon, Pelasgus, Alalcomeneus, Dysaules, Cabeirus, Phlyus (father of Celaenus), and Leitus.
Uranus	The Titans (Oceanus, Coeus, Crius, Iapetus, Hyperion, Theia, Themis, Tethys, Phoebe, Mnemosyne, Rhea, and Cronus) The Cyclopes (Arges, Brontes, and Steropes) The Hecatonchires (Briareus, Cottus, and Gyes) The Meliae (Note: Some said they were born from Uranus' blood when Cronus castrated him.) The Erinyes The Gigantes	The Curetes (Note: The Kouretes were born from rainwater (Uranus [peacefully] fertilizing Gaia).) The Elder Muses: Mneme, Melete, and Aoide The Telchines: Actaeus, Megalesius, Ormenus, and Lycus Aetna Aristaeus
Tartarus	Typhon	Echidna (Note: Echidna was more commonly held to be child of Phorcys and Ceto.) Giants: Enceladus, Coeus, Astraeus, Pelorus, Pallas, Emphytus, Rhoecus, Agrius, Ephialtes, Eurytus, Themoises, Theodamas, Otus, Polybotes, and Iapetus.
Pontus	Nereus, Thaumas, Phorcys, Ceto, Eurybia	The Telchines
Aether	N/A	Dolor (Pain), Dolus (Deception), Ira (Anger), Luctus (Mourning), Mendacium (Lying), Iusiurandum (Oath), Vltio (Vengeance), Intemperantia (Self-indulgence), Altercatio (Quarreling), Oblivio (Forgetfulness), Socordia (Sloth), Timor (Fear), Superbia (Arrogance), Incestum (Incest), Pugna (Fighting), Oceanus (Ocean), Themis, Tartarus, Pontus, the Titans, Briareus, Gyges, Steropes, Atlas, Hyperion, Polus, Saturn, Ops, Moneta, Dione, the Furies (Alecto, Megaera, and Tisiphone)
Poseidon	N/A	Antaeus, Charybdis, Laistrygon
Helios	N/A	Achelous, Acheron, Bisaltes, Tritopatores
Zeus	N/A	Agdistis, Manes, Cyprian Centaurs
Oceanus	N/A	Triptolemos
Hephaestus	N/A	Erichthonius of Athens
Unknown	N/A	Lesser Giants; Alpos; Anax; Argus Panoptes; Damasen; The Gegenees; Hyllus; Orion; Sykeus; Tityos; Monsters and Animals; Arion; Caerus; Colchian dragon; Ophiotauros; Python; Scorpius; Creusa; Pheme; Silenus

List notes:

== See also ==
- Bhumi
- Gaia philosophy
- Mother Nature
- Pachamama
