= Pontus (mythology) =

Greek personification of the sea

- Personification of the Sea
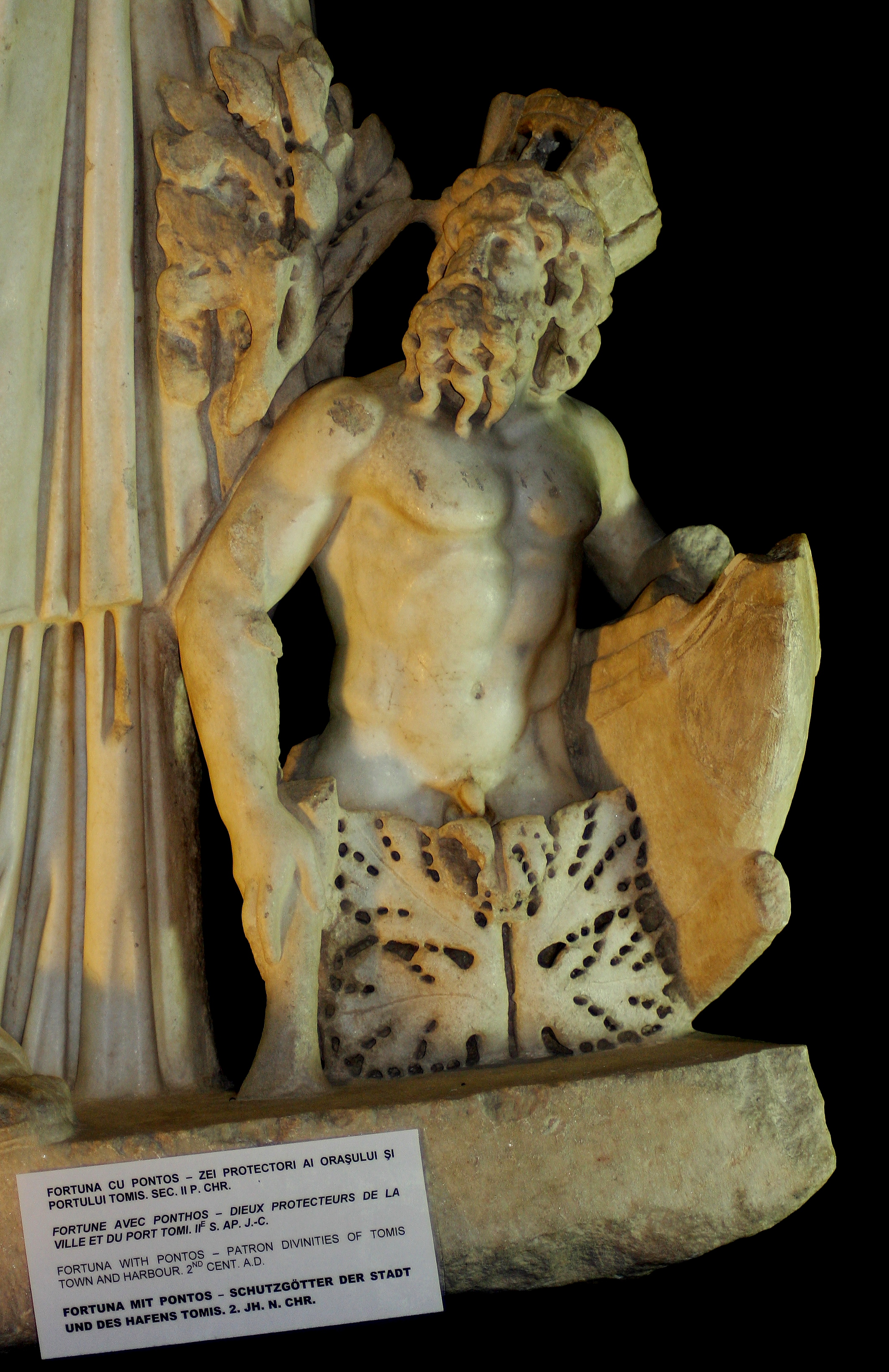
- Pontus depicted as a patron of the city of Tomis (modern-day Constanța, Romania) alongside Fortuna (left), marble statue, 2nd century AD
- Parents: Gaia
- Consort: Gaia
- Offspring: Nereus, Thaumas, Phorcys, Ceto, Eurybia

In Greek mythology, Pontus (Ancient Greek: Πόντος, lit. 'Sea') is the personification of the sea. In Hesiod's Theogony (8th or 7th century BC), he is the offspring of Gaia (the Earth), who produces him alone. With Gaia, he becomes the progenitor of a family comprising mostly marine beings and monsters; the pair's children are Nereus, Phorcys, Ceto, Thaumas, and Eurybia. In a fragment of the lost Titanomachy (late 7th century BC or afterwards), Pontus and Gaia are described as the parents of Aigaion. The 2nd-century AD Fabulae assigns Pontus a consort named Mare ('The sea'), and places him as the son of Gaia and Aether (the Upper Sky).

Pontus is depicted on a Roman mosaic from Mérida, Spain, dating to around the late 2nd century AD, on which only fragments of his body survive. A 2nd-century AD marble statue shows him as a patron deity of Tomis (modern-day Constanța, Romania), alongside the Roman goddess Fortuna.

== Name ==
In Ancient Greek, the word póntos (πόντος) means 'sea', and derives from the Proto-Indo-European *pont-eh₁-, *pn̥t-h₁, meaning 'path'. The name was also sometimes used to refer to the Black Sea.

== Genealogy ==
Pontus is the Greek personification of the sea. He does not appear in any mythological stories, and in literature is attested solely in a genealogical context. In the Theogony of the poet Hesiod, who dates to the 8th or 7th century BC, (Note: For this dating, see Schachter, p. 356.) Pontus is the offspring of Gaia (the personification of the Earth), produced without the aid of a father. (Note: Gantz, p. 10; Fowler, p. 5; Hesiod, Theogony 126–132 (Most, pp. 12, 13).) With Gaia, he becomes the progenitor of a family that includes mostly beings connected with the sea and various monsters; (Note: Hard, pp. 24, 31; West 1966, p. 36. For tables of the descendants of Pontus and Gaia, see Grimal, p. 552, Table 32 and Hard, p. 696, Table 3.) the latter group are made descendants of Pontus owing to their terrible nature, which requires that they be made genealogically distant from the main divine family of the Olympians. The offspring of Pontus and Gaia are: (Note: While Tripp and Hard (cited at the end of the sentence) describe Nereus's parents as both Pontus and Gaia, Gantz, p. 16 notes that Hesiod does not explicitly specify that Gaia is his mother.) Nereus and Phorcys, both of whom are sea gods; Ceto, a sea monster; and Eurybia and Thaumas. (Note: Tripp, s.v. Pontus, p. 490; Hard, p. 50; Hesiod, Theogony 233–239 (Most, pp. 20–23). Tripp describes Ceto as a sea monster; Hard does not, but (on p. 58) he glosses her name as 'Sea-monster woman'. Nereus was the eldest of Pontus's children (West 1966, p. 39).) According to Martin Litchfield West, it appears that all of these children dwell in the sea. (Note: West 1966, p. 189 on line 106. West writes that this is the case "so far as we can tell".) They are interpreted by Francisco Díez de Velasco as representing the two dimensions of the sea which sailors would have experienced early on in the archaic period (c. 800–480 BC): Nereus stands for the "favourable" sea, and Phorcys, Ceto, and Eurybia for that which is "monstrous".

The Titanomachy was a lost epic poem composed in the late 7th century BC or afterwards, sometimes attributed in antiquity to the Corinthian poet Eumelus. A fragment of the poem attested that it described Pontus and Gaia as the parents of Aigaion, who was said to have battled alongside the Titans in the Titanomachy (the war between the Titans and the Olympians, the younger generation of gods). (Note: Gantz, pp. 1–2; West 1966, p. 210 on line 149; Hard, p. 67; Titanomachy fr. 3 (West 2003, pp. 224–225) [= Scholia on Apollonius of Rhodes, 1.1165c (Wendel, p. 105)].)

The Bibliotheca of Apollodorus, a mythological handbook probably composed in the 1st or 2nd century AD, (Note: For this dating, see Hard, p. 3.) provides Pontus with, by Gaia, the same brood of five children as the Theogony. (Note: Smith & Trzaskoma, "Genealogical Charts", Figure 1; Apollodorus, 1.2.6 (Frazer, pp. 12–15).) In the Fabulae, a Latin mythological handbook attributed to Hyginus and probably dating to around the 2nd century AD, (Note: For this dating, see Hard, p. 13.) Pontus is said to be the offspring of Gaia and Aether (the personification of the Upper Sky). (Note: Díez de Velasco, s.v. Pontos, p. 436; Hyginus, Fabulae Preface 3 (Smith & Trzaskoma, p. 95; Marshall, p. 10).) The poem also names his consort as Mare ('The sea'); (Note: Hornblower, para. 1; Hyginus, Fabulae 5 (Smith & Trzaskoma, p. 95; Marshall, p. 11). For the translation of mare, see Glare, s.v. mare, p. 1078.) according to Simon Hornblower, this figure is Thalassa, or "the sea under yet other names". With Mare, he is the progenitor of all fish. (Note: Díez de Velasco, s.v. Pontos, p. 436; Hyginus, Fabulae Preface 5 (Smith & Trzaskoma, p. 95; Marshall, p. 11). The Fabulae also repeats the children of Pontus and Gaia found in the Theogony and in Apollodorus, with the exception of Eurybia (Smith & Trzaskoma, p. 95).) According to the 12th-century AD Byzantine poet John Tzetzes, some ancient authors described the Telchines as the offspring of Pontus and Gaia. (Note: Gantz, p. 149; Tzetzes, Theogonia 83–86 (Matranga, p. 580). Tzetzes gives the names of the individual Telchines as Actaeus, Megalesius, Ormenus and Lycus.)

== Iconography ==
Alongside various other cosmogonic figures, Pontus is depicted on a Roman polychrome mosaic from Mérida, Spain, dating to around the latter half of the 2nd century or the early 3rd century AD. (Note: Tran, p. 133. Tran dates the work to second half of 2nd century AD; Díez de Velasco, p. 437 places it around the end of the 2nd century to the start of the 3rd century AD.) He is located on the work's most damaged section, and only certain parts of the body survive, including his feet (which are bare), one of his legs, and one hand. He is accompanied by an inscription of his name, and is situated in the lowest area of the mosaic, which is also inhabited by Oceanus and other marine figures. According to Díez de Velasco, in this mosaic Pontus represents the "navigable sea"; he is wholly favourable, the sea "tamed by the power of Rome".

A Roman marble statue dating to the 2nd century AD depicts Pontus and the goddess Fortuna as the patron gods of the city of Tomis (modern-day Constanța, Romania), along the west coast of the Black Sea. He is portrayed as much smaller than Fortuna, and is located beside her legs. (Note: For an image of the full statue, see File:Fortuna cu Pontos.jpg.) According to Zdravko Dimitrov, the statue's stonemasonry displays Anatolian influence.

== See also ==
- List of water deities
- Pontus (region)
