= Hecatoncheires =

Greek mythological giants with 50 heads and 100 arms

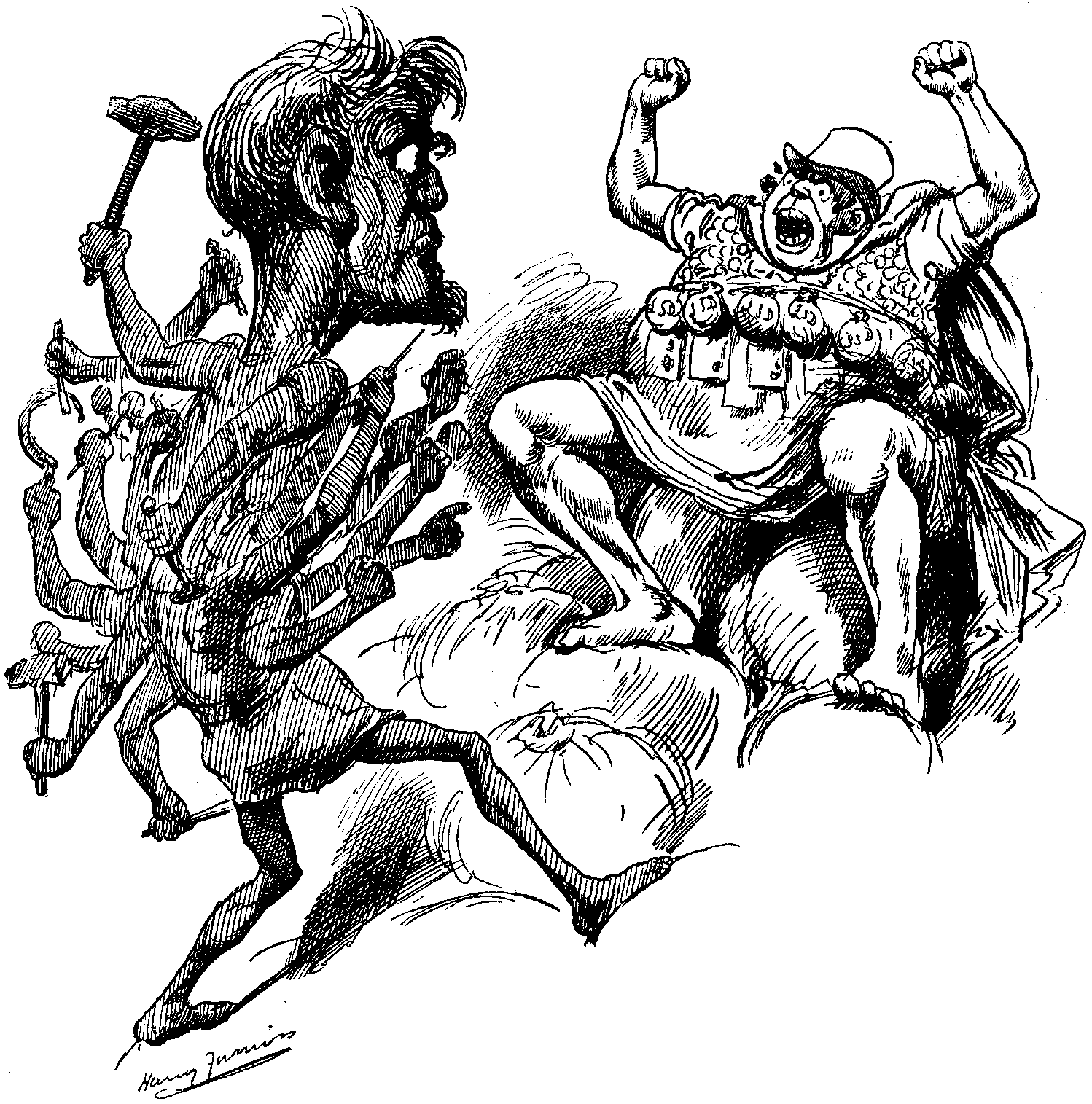
The Hundred-Hander Briareus used as an allegory of the multiple threat of labour unrest to capital in a political cartoon, 1890.

In Greek mythology, the Hecatoncheires (Ancient Greek: Ἑκατόγχειρες, romanized: Hekatóncheires, lit. 'Hundred-Handed Ones'), also called Hundred-Handers or Centimanes (/ˈsɛntɪmeɪnz/; Latin: Centimani), were three monstrous giants, of enormous size and strength, each with fifty heads and one hundred arms. They were individually named Cottus (the furious), Briareus (or Aegaeon, the sea goat) and Gyges (or Gyes, the long-limbed). In the standard tradition, they were the offspring of Uranus (Sky) and of Gaia (Earth), and helped Zeus and the Olympians to overthrow the Titans in the Titanomachy.

== Names ==
The three Hundred-Handers were named Cottus, Briareus and Gyges. Cottus (Κόττος) is a common Thracian name, and is perhaps related to the name of the Thracian goddess Kotys. The name Briareus (Βριάρεως) was probably formed from the Ancient Greek βριαρός (Briaros), meaning "strong". Hesiod's Theogony also calls him "Obriareus". The name Gyges is possibly related to the mythical Attic king Ogyges (Ὠγύγης). "Gyes", rather than Gyges, is found in some texts.

Homer's Iliad gives Briareus a second name, saying that Briareus is the name the gods use for him, while Aegaeon (Αἰγαίων) is the name used by mortals. The root αἰγ- is found in words associated with the sea: αἰγιαλός 'shore', αἰγες and αἰγάδες 'waves'. The name suggests a connection with the Aegean Sea. Poseidon was sometimes called Aegaeon or Aegaeus (Αἰγαῖος). Aegaeon could be a patronymic, i.e. "son of Aegaeus", or it could instead mean "the man from Aegae".

The name Hecatoncheires derives from the Greek ἑκατόν (hekaton 'hundred') and χείρ (cheir 'hand' or 'arm'). Although the Theogony describes the three brothers as having one hundred hands (ἑκατὸν μὲν χεῖρες), the collective name Hecatoncheires (Ἑκατόγχειρες), i.e. the Hundred-Handers, is never used. The Theogony once refers to the brothers collectively as "the gods whom Zeus brought up from the dark", otherwise it simply uses their individual names: Cottus, Briareus (or Obriareus) and Gyges.

The Iliad does not use the name Hecatoncheires either, although it does use the adjective hekatoncheiros (ἑκατόγχειρος), i.e., 'hundred-handed', to describe Briareus. It is possible that Acusilaus used the name, but the first certain usage is found in the works of the mythographers such as Apollodorus.

== Mythology ==
=== The Hundred-Handers ===
The Hundred-Handers, Cottus, Briareus and Gyges, were three monstrous giants, of enormous size and strength, with fifty heads and one hundred arms. They were among the eighteen offspring of Uranus (Sky) and Gaia (Earth), which also included the twelve Titans, and the three one-eyed Cyclopes. According to the Theogony of Hesiod, they were the last of these children of Uranus to be born, while according to the mythographer Apollodorus they were the first. In the Hesiodic tradition, they played a key role in the Greek succession myth, which told how the Titan Cronus overthrew his father Uranus, and how in turn Zeus overthrew Cronus and his fellow Titans, and how Zeus was eventually established as the final and permanent ruler of the cosmos.

According to the standard version of the succession myth, given in the accounts of Hesiod and Apollodorus, the Hundred-Handers, along with their brothers the Cyclopes, were imprisoned by their father Uranus. Gaia induced Cronus to castrate Uranus, and Cronus took over the supremacy of the cosmos. With his sister the Titaness Rhea, Cronus fathered several offspring, but he swallowed each of them at birth. However, Cronus' last child Zeus was saved by Rhea, and Zeus freed his brothers and sisters, and together they (the Olympians) began a great war, the Titanomachy, against the Titans, for control of the cosmos. Gaia had foretold that, with the help of the Hundred-Handers, the Olympians would be victorious, so Zeus released them from their captivity and the Hundred-Handers fought alongside the Olympians against the Titans and were instrumental in the Titans' defeat. The Titans were then imprisoned in Tartarus with the Hundred-Handers as their guards.

The lost epic poem the Titanomachy (see below), although probably written after Hesiod's Theogony, perhaps preserved an older tradition in which the Hundred-Handers fought on the side of the Titans, rather than the Olympians. According to a euhemeristic rationalized account, given by Palaephatus, Cottus and Briareus, rather than being hundred-handed giants, were men who were called Hundred-Handers because they lived in a city called Hecatoncheiria ("Hundredarm"). They came to the aid of the mortal residents of the city of Olympia (that is, the "Olympians") in driving away the Titans from their city.

=== Briareus/Aegaeon ===
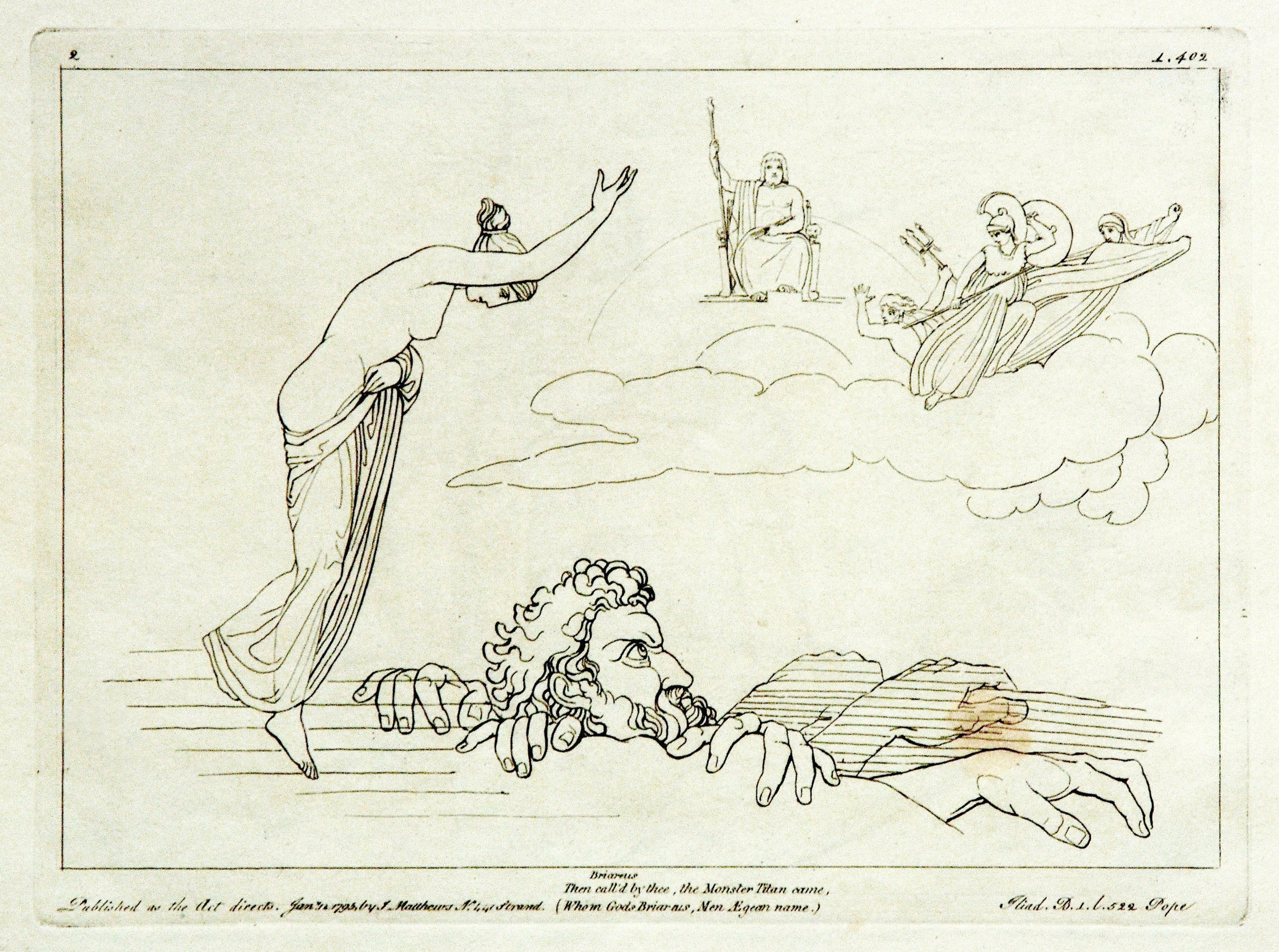
Briareus, summoned to Olympus by Thetis to quell a revolt against Zeus by Poseidon, Athena and Hera. Etching by Tommaso Piroli (1795) after a drawing of John Flaxman.

Briareus was the most prominent of the three Hundred-Handers. In Hesiod's Theogony he is singled out as being "good", and is rewarded by Poseidon, who gives Briareus his daughter Cymopolea (otherwise unknown) as wife.

In Homer's Iliad, Briareus is given a second name, Aegaeon, and it is said that the gods call him Briareus whereas humans call him Aegaeon. It is told in the Iliad how, during a palace revolt by the Olympians Hera, Poseidon and Athena, who wished to chain Zeus, the sea goddess Thetis brought to Olympus:

him of the hundred hands [ἑκατόγχειρον], whom the gods call Briareus, but all men Aegaeon; for he is mightier than his father. He sat down by the side of [Zeus], exulting in his glory, and the blessed gods were seized with fear of him, and did not bind Zeus.

This second name does not seem to be a Homeric invention. According to the scholiast on Apollonius of Rhodes, the legendary seventh-century BC poet Cinaethon apparently knew both names for the Hundred-Hander. The name also appears in the lost epic poem the Titanomachy.

==== Titan ally ====
While in Hesiod and Homer, the powerful Hundred-Hander Briareus was a faithful and rewarded ally of Zeus, the Titanomachy seems to have reflected a different tradition. Apparently, according to the Titanomachy, Aegaeon was the son of Gaia and Pontus (Sea), rather than Gaia and Uranus, and fought on the side of the Titans, rather than the Olympians. The scholiast on Apollonius of Rhodes tells us that, according to Cinaethon, Aegeaon was defeated by Poseidon. Apollonius of Rhodes mentions the "great tomb of Aegaeon", seen by the Argonauts when "they were passing within sight of the mouth of the Rhyndacus […] a short distance beyond Phrygia". The scholiast on Apollonius says that the tomb marked the spot where Aegaeon's defeat occurred.

To the Latin poets Virgil and Ovid, as in the lost Titanomachy, Briareus was an enemy of the gods, not an ally. In his Aeneid, Virgil has Aegaeon make war against the gods, "with fifty sounding shields and fifty swords". Ovid, in his poem Fasti, has Briareus on the side of the Titans. As Ovid tells us, after the Titans had been overthrown—apparently in order to restore the Titans to power—Briareus sacrificed a bull, about which it had been prophesied that whoever burned its entrails would be able to conquer the gods; however, just when Briareus was about to burn the entrails, birds snatched them away, and were rewarded with a home among the stars.

==== Association with the sea ====
In the lost epic Titanomachy, Aegaeon was the son of Pontus (Sea) and lived in the sea. Briareus/Aegaeon's association with the sea can perhaps already be seen in Hesiod and Homer. In the Theogony, Briareus ends up living, apart from his brothers, with Cymopolea the (sea-nymph?) daughter of Poseidon the god of the sea, where it might be supposed the couple dwells, while in the Iliad one might also suppose that Briareus dwells in the sea, since it was the sea goddess Thetis that fetched him to Olympus. Apparently, this was made explicit by the fifth-century BC poet Ion of Chios, who, on referring to the Homeric story of the Olympians' revolt against Zeus, said that Aegaeon was the son of Thalassa (Sea) and that Thetis "summoned him from the Ocean". A connection to the sea can also be seen in the name Aegaeon (Αἰγαίων᾽) itself. The root αἰγ- is found in words associated with the sea: αἰγιαλός 'shore', αἰγες and αἰγάδες 'waves'. while Poseidon himself was sometimes called Aegaeon.

Later writers also make Briareus/Aegaeon's association with the sea explicit. According to Aelian, Aristotle said that the Pillars of Heracles (i.e. the Strait of Gibraltar) had been previously named the Pillars of Briareus. Ovid, in his Metamorphoses, describes Aegaeon as a "dark-hued" sea god "whose strong arms can overpower huge whales", while according to Arrian apparently, the Aegean Sea was said to have been named after Aegaeon. As reported by Pliny, according to the Euboean Archemachus, the first man to sail in a "long ship” was Aegaeon.

==== Oeolyca ====
According to the sixth-century BC lyric poet Ibycus, the belt that Heracles was sent to fetch in his ninth labour (usually said to have belonged to Hippolyta), belonged to Oeolyca, the daughter of Briareus.

==== Euboea ====
Briareus/Aegaeon had a particular connection with the Greek island Euboea. According to the third-century Latin grammarian Solinus, Briareus was worshipped at Carystus, and Aegaeon at Chalcis. Aegaeon was said to be the name of a ruler of Carystus, which had also been named Aigaie (Αίγαίη) after him, while Briareus was said to be the father of Euboea, after whom the island took its name. Aegeaon was perhaps associated with the place name Aegae mentioned by Homer (Il. 13.21, Od. 5.381) as Poseidon's home, and located by Strabo (8.7.4, 9.2.13) in Euboea north of Chalcis, as a place where Poseidon had a temple.

==== Poseidon ====
Briareus/Aegaeon seems also closely connected with Poseidon. The name Aegaeon has associations with Poseidon. As noted above, Homer locates Poseidon's palace in Aegae. Poseidon was sometimes himself called Aegaeon, or Aegaeus (Αἰγαῖος), and Aegaeon could mean 'son of Aegaeus'.

Homer says that Briareus/Aegaeon "is mightier than his father", but whom Homer is referring to as the father is unclear. It has been sometimes supposed that, contrary to Hesiod (who makes Uranus the father of Briareus, Cottus and Gyges), the father being referred to here is Poseidon, although this interpretation of Homer is uncertain at best.

In the Theogony, Briareus becomes the son-in-law of Poseidon, while Poseidon, whether regarded as the father of Briareus/Aegaeon or not, is a central figure in the story told about the Hundred-Hander in the ‘’Iliad’’. Both are sea-gods with a special connection to Euboea. As noted above, Poseidon was sometimes called Aegaeon, and it is possible that Aegaeon was an older cult-title for Poseidon, however – according to Lewis Richard Farnell – it is likelier that Poseidon inherited the title of an "older Euboean sea-giant". The scholiast on Apollonius of Rhodes tells us that, according to Cinaethon, Aegeaon was defeated by Poseidon. Possibly then, Briareus/Aegaeon was an older (maybe pre-Greek) sea god eventually displaced by Poseidon.

According to a Corinthian legend, Briareus was the arbitrator in a dispute between Poseidon and Helios (Sun) over some land, deciding that the Isthmus of Corinth belonged to Poseidon and the acropolis of Corinth (Acrocorinth) to Helios.

==== Buried under Etna, inventor of armour ====
The third-century BC poet Callimachus, apparently confusing Briareus as one of the Giants, says he was buried under Mount Etna in Sicily, making his shift from one shoulder to the other the cause of earthquakes. Like Callimachus, Philostratus also makes Aegaeon the cause of earthquakes. According to an Oxyrhynchus papyrus, "the first to use metal armour was Briareos, whilst previously men protected their bodies with animal skins". These stories might be connected to a myth that presented Briareus, similarly to Hephaestus's myth, as an subterranean smith who used the fires of Etna as a forge for metalworking.

==== Possible origins ====
Briareus and Aegaeon were perhaps originally separate entities. Briareus/Aegaeon may have once been a many-armed sea monster, personifying the uncontrolled power of the sea itself. Briareus/Aegaeon may have been an older god of the sea, replaced by Poseidon. He was perhaps a Greek reflection of Near-Eastern traditions in which the Sea challenged the storm-god, such as in the Ugaritic tradition of the battle between Yammu (Sea) and the storm-god Baal.

== Principal sources ==
=== The Theogony ===
According to the Theogony of Hesiod, Uranus (Sky) mated with Gaia (Earth) and produced eighteen children. First came the twelve Titans, next the three one-eyed Cyclopes, and finally the three monstrous brothers Cottus, Briareus and Gyges. As the Theogony describes it:

Then from Earth and Sky came forth three more sons, great and strong, unspeakable, Cottus and Briareus and Gyges, presumptuous children. A hundred arms sprang forth from their shoulders, unapproachable, and upon their massive limbs grew fifty heads out of each one’s shoulders; and the mighty strength in their great forms was immense.

Uranus hated his children, including the Hundred-Handers, and as soon as each was born, he imprisoned them underground, somewhere deep inside Gaia. As the Theogony describes it, Uranus bound the Hundred-Handers

... with a mighty bond, for he was indignant at their defiant manhood and their form and size; and he settled them under the broad-pathed earth. Dwelling there, under the earth, in pain, they sat at the edge, at the limits of the great earth, suffering greatly for a long time, with much grief in their hearts.

Eventually Uranus' son, the Titan Cronus, castrated Uranus, freeing his fellow Titans (but not, apparently, the Hundred-Handers), and Cronus became the new ruler of the cosmos. Cronus married his sister Rhea, and together they produced five children, whom Cronus swallowed as each was born, but the sixth child, Zeus, was saved by Rhea and hidden away to be raised by his grandmother Gaia. When Zeus grew up, he caused Cronus to disgorge his children, and a great war was begun, the Titanomachy, between Zeus and his siblings, and Cronus and the Titans, for control of the cosmos.

Gaia had foretold that Zeus would be victorious with the help of the Hundred-Handers, so Zeus released the Hundred-Handers from their bondage under the earth, and brought them up again into the light. Zeus restored their strength by feeding them nectar and ambrosia, and then asked the Hundred-Handers to "manifest your great strength and your untouchable hands" and join in the war against the Titans.

And Cottus, speaking for the Hundred-Handers, agreed saying:

... It is by your prudent plans that we have once again come back out from under the murky gloom, from implacable bonds—something, Lord, Cronus’ son, that we no longer hoped to experience. For that reason, with ardent thought and eager spirit we in turn shall now rescue your supremacy in the dread battle-strife, fighting against the Titans in mighty combats.

And so the Hundred-Handers "took up their positions against the Titans ... holding enormous boulders in their massive hands", and a final great battle was fought. Striding forth from Olympus, Zeus unleashed the full fury of his thunderbolt, stunning and blinding the Titans, while the Hundred-handers pelted them with enormous boulders:

... among the foremost Cottus and Briareus and Gyges, insatiable of war, roused up bitter battle; and they hurled three hundred boulders from their massive hands one after another and overshadowed the Titans with their missiles. They sent them down under the broad-pathed earth and bound them in distressful bonds after they had gained victory over them with their hands, high-spirited though they were, as far down beneath the earth as the sky is above the earth.

Thus the Titans were finally defeated and cast into Tartarus, where they were imprisoned.

As to the fate of the Hundred-Handers, the Theogony first tells us that they returned to Tartarus, to live nearby the "bronze gates" of the Titans' prison, where presumably, they took up the job of the Titans' warders. However, later in the poem, we are told that Cottus and Gyges "live in mansions upon the foundations of Ocean", while Briareus, "since he was good", became the son-in-law of Poseidon, who gave him "Cymopoliea his daughter to wed".

=== The Iliad ===
In a story that survives nowhere else, the Iliad briefly mentions Briareus (where it is said he was also called Aegaeon), referring to his having been summoned to Zeus' defense when "the other Olympians wished to put [Zeus] in bonds, even Hera and Poseidon and Pallas Athene." Achilles, while asking his mother the sea goddess Thetis to intercede with Zeus on his behalf, reminds her of a frequent boast of hers, that, at a time when the other Olympians wished to bind Zeus, she saved him by fetching the hundred-handed Briareus to Olympus:

But you came, goddess, and freed [Zeus] from his bonds, when you had quickly called to high Olympus him of the hundred hands, whom the gods call Briareus, but all men Aegaeon; for he is mightier than his father. He sat down by the side of the son of Cronos, exulting in his glory, and the blessed gods were seized with fear of him, and did not bind Zeus.

Who Homer means here as the father of Briareus/Aegaeon is unclear.

=== The Titanomachy ===
The lost epic poem the Titanomachy, based on its title, must have told the story of the war between the Olympians and the Titans. Although probably written after Hesiod's Theogony, it perhaps reflected an older version of the story. Only references to it by ancient sources survive, often attributing the poem to Eumelus a semi-legendary poet from Corinth. One mentions Aegaeon, the name identified with the Hundred-Hander Briareus in the Iliad. According to a scholion on Apollonius of Rhodes' Argonautica:

Eumelus in the Titanomachy says that Aigaion was the son of Earth and Sea, lived in the sea, and fought on the side of the Titans.

Thus the Titanomachy apparently followed a different tradition than the more familiar account in the Theogony. Here Briareus/Aegaeon was the son of Earth (Gaia) and Sea (Pontus) rather than Earth and Sky (Uranus), and he fought against the Olympians, rather than for them.

=== Ion of Chios ===
According to the aforementioned scholion on Apollonius of Rhodes, the fifth-century BC poet Ion of Chios said that Aegaeon (whom Thetis summoned in the Iliad to aid Zeus), lived in the sea and was the son of Thalassa.

=== Virgil ===
The first-century BC Latin poet Virgil, in his Aeneid, may have drawn on the same version of the story as that given in the lost Titanomachy. Virgil locates Briareus, as in Hesiod, in the underworld, where the Hundred-Hander dwells among "strange prodigies of bestial kind", which include the Centaurs, Scylla, the Lernaean Hydra, the Chimaera, the Gorgons, the Harpies, and Geryon.

Later Virgil describes the "hundred-handed" Aegaeon (the Iliad's Briareus):

Like old Aegaeon of the hundred arms,
the hundred-handed, from whose mouths and breasts
blazed fifty fiery blasts, as he made war
with fifty sounding shields and fifty swords
against Jove's thunder.

Here Virgil has the Hundred-Hander as having fought on the side of the Titans rather than the Olympians, as in the Titanomachy, with the additional descriptive details of the fifty fire-breathing mouths and breasts, and the fifty sets of sword and shield, perhaps also coming from that lost poem.

=== Ovid ===
The late first-century BC Latin poet Ovid, makes several references to the Hundred-Handers Briareus and Gyges in his poems. Briareus figures in a story that Ovid tells in his Fasti about how "The star of the Kite" (presumably a star or constellation named after the bird) came to reside in the heavens. According to Ovid, there was a monstrous offspring of "mother Earth", part bull, part serpent, about which it had been prophesied that whoever burned its entrails would be able to conquer the gods. Warned by the three Fates, Styx penned up the bull in "gloomy woods" surrounded by three walls. After the Titans were overthrown, Briareus (whom Ovid appears to regard as a Titan, or Titan ally) "sacrificed" the bull with an adamantine axe. But when he was about to burn the entrails, the birds, as commanded by Jupiter (Zeus), snatched them away, and were rewarded with a home among the stars. In his Metamorphoses, Ovid describes Aegaeon (the Iliad's Briareus) as a "dark-hued" sea god "whose strong arms can overpower huge whales". In both of these poems, Ovid appears to be following the same tradition as in the lost Titanomachy, where Aegaeon was the sea god son of Pontus and a Titan ally.

Ovid mentions "Gyas of the hundred hands" in his Amores, when "Earth made her ill attempt at vengeance, and steep Ossa, with shelving Pelion on its back, was piled upon Olympus." In his Fasti, Ovid has Ceres (Demeter), complaining about the abduction of her daughter, say: "What worse wrong could I have suffered if Gyges had been victorious and I his captive." In both of these poems, Ovid has apparently confused the hundred-handers with the Giants (a different set of monstrous offspring of Gaia) who tried to storm Olympus in the Gigantomachy. Ovid perhaps also confused the Hundred-Handers with the Giants in his Metamorphoses, where he refers to the Giants having tried to "fix their hundred arms on captive Heaven". Ovid also refers to "a hundred-handed Gyes" in his Tristia.

=== Apollodorus ===
The mythographer Apollodorus gives an account of the Hundred-Handers similar to that of Hesiod's, but with several significant differences. According to Apollodorus, they were the first offspring of Uranus and Gaia, (unlike Hesiod who makes the Titans the eldest) followed by the Cyclopes, and the Titans.

Apollodorus describes the Hundred-Handers as "unsurpassed in size and might, each of them having a hundred hands and fifty heads."

Uranus bound the Hundred-Handers and the Cyclopes, and cast them all into Tartarus, "a gloomy place in Hades as far distant from earth as earth is distant from the sky." But the Titans are, apparently, allowed to remain free (unlike in Hesiod). When the Titans overthrew Uranus, they freed the Hundred-Handers and Cyclopes (unlike in Hesiod where they remain imprisoned), and made Cronus their sovereign. But Cronus once again bound the six brothers, and reimprisoned them in Tartarus.

As in Hesiod's account, Cronus swallowed his children; but Zeus, who was saved by Rhea, freed his siblings, and together they waged war against the Titans. According to Apollodorus, in the tenth year of the war, Zeus learned from Gaia, that to win he needed both the Hundred-Handers and the Cyclopes, so Zeus slew their warder Campe and released them:

They fought for ten years, and Earth prophesied victory to Zeus if he should have as allies those who had been hurled down to Tartarus. So he slew their jailoress Campe, and loosed their bonds. And ... the gods overcame the Titans, shut them up in Tartarus, and appointed the Hundred-handers their guards.

=== Others ===
The fifth-century BC philosopher Plato, in his dialogue Laws, emphasizes the importance of involving "all" of a soldier's hands (of which there are normally two) during military training: "That indeed if a man is gifted in the form of Briareus, with his hundred hands, he should train with his 100 hands".

The first-century AD Latin poet Horace twice mentions Gyges the "centimanus" (Latin for "hundred-handed"). In one poem, Gyges and the "fiery Chimaera" are given as examples of fearsome creatures. In another poem, Gyges is used as an example of a "power", hated by the gods, "that devises every kind of evil in its heart".

According to the second-century AD geographer Pausanias, a Corinthian legend said that Briareus was the arbitrator in a dispute between Poseidon and Helios (Sun) over some land. Briareus adjudged that the Isthmus of Corinth belonged to Poseidon and the acropolis of Corinth (Acrocorinth) to Helios.

Servius, the late-fourth-to-early-fifth-century AD commentator on Virgil's works, also seems to know of two versions of the Titanomachy, one in which the Hundred-Handers fought on the side of the Olympians, as in Hesiod, and the other in which they fought on the side of the Titans, as in the lost Titanomachy.

The fifth-century AD Greek poet Nonnus, in his Dionysiaca, mentions Briareus with his "ready hands" and Aegaeon as the "protector of [Zeusian] laws."

== In literature ==
Briareus is mentioned twice in Dante Alighieri's Divine Comedy (which was completed in 1320): he is first found as a giant inhabiting the Ninth Circle of Hell, and then again as an example of pride, carved into the pavement of the first terrace of Purgatory. He is also mentioned in Chapter 8 of Don Quixote, his arms being compared to the whirling sails of a windmill; Miguel de Cervantes may have had in mind Virgil, Dante, and Giulio Romano's Fall of Giants.

== See also ==
- Chaturbhuja – Hindu iconography of four-armed deities
- Ashtabhuja – Iconographic form of eight-armed deities in Hinduism
- Asura (Buddhism) – Demigod in Buddhism
- Greek mythology in popular culture
