= Campe =

Greek mythological monster

In Greek mythology, Campe, Kampe, or Kampê (/ˈkæmpiː/; Greek: Κάμπη) was a female monster. She was the guard, in Tartarus, of the Cyclopes and Hecatoncheires, whom Uranus had imprisoned there. When it was prophesied to Zeus that he would be victorious in the Titanomachy—the great war against the Titans—with the help of Campe's prisoners, he killed Campe, freeing the Cyclopes and Hecatoncheires, who then helped Zeus defeat Cronus.

== Name ==
The name given in Greek texts is Κάμπη, with an accent on the first syllable. As a common noun κάμπη is the Greek word for caterpillar or silkworm. It is probably related to the homophone καμπή (with the accent on the second syllable) whose first meaning is the winding of a river, and came to mean, more generally, any kind of bend, or curve.

== Sources ==
We first hear of the imprisonment of the Cyclopes and Hecatoncheires, and their subsequent release by Zeus, in Hesiod's Theogony. However Hesiod makes no mention of Campe, or any guard for the prisoners. These events were probably also told in the lost epic poem the Titanomachy, upon which the mythographer Apollodorus perhaps based his account of the war. According to Apollodorus:

Zeus waged the war against Cronus and the Titans. They fought for ten years, and Earth prophesied victory to Zeus if he should have as allies those who had been hurled down to Tartarus. So he slew their jailoress Campe, and loosed their bonds.

Diodorus Siculus says that the god Dionysus, while camped beside the Libyan city of Zabirna, encountered and killed "an earth-born monster called Campê" that was terrorizing the city, killing many of its residents. Neither Apollodorus nor Diodorus provide any description of Campe; however, the Greek poet Nonnus provides an elaborately detailed one. According to Nonnus, Zeus, with his thunderbolt, destroyed:

highheaded Campe ... for all the many crooked shapes of her whole body. A thousand crawlers from her viperish feet, spitting poison afar, were fanning Enyo to a flame, a mass of misshapen coils. Round her neck flowered fifty various heads of wild beasts : some roared with lion's heads like the grim face of the riddling Sphinx; others were spluttering foam from the tusks of wild boars; her countenance was the very image of Scylla with a marshalled regiment of thronging dog's heads. Doubleshaped, she appeared a woman to the middle of her body, with clusters of poison-spitting serpents for hair. Her giant form, from the chest to the parting-point of the thighs, was covered all over with a bastard shape of hard sea-monsters' scales. The claws of her wide-scattering hands were curved like a crooktalon sickle. From her neck over her terrible shoulders, with tail raised high over her throat, a scorpion with an icy sting sharp-whetted crawled and coiled upon itself. Such was manifoldshaped Campe as she rose writhing, and flew roaming about earth and air and briny deep, and flapping a couple of dusky wings, rousing tempests and arming gales, that blackwinged nymphe of Tartaros: from her eyelids a flickering flame belched out far-travelling sparks. Yet heavenly Zeus ... killed that great monster, and conquered the snaky Enyo Cronos.

Thus for Nonnus, Campe is woman-like from the upper torso and above, with the scales of a sea-monster from the chest down, with several snaky appendages, along with the parts of several other animals protruding from her body. His description of Campe is similar to Hesiod's description of the monster Typhon (Theogony 820 ff.). Joseph Eddy Fontenrose says that for Nonnus, Campe "was a female counterpart of his Typhon ... That is, she was Echidna under a different name, as Nonnus indicates, calling her Echidnaean Enyo, identifying her snaky legs with echidnas, and likening her to Sphinx and Skylla".
