= Ophiotaurus =

Hybrid bull-serpent creature in Greek mythology

In Greek mythology, the Ophiotaurus (Ancient Greek: Ὀφιόταυρος) was a creature that was part bull and part snake. Its only known appearance in an ancient work was in Ovid's Fasti. In this poem, it was the subject of a prophecy which warned that whoever burned its innards would defeat the gods. Briareus of the Hecatoncheires attempted to burn the Ophiotaurus' innards, but was foiled by birds sent by Zeus. This story was part of the larger Titanomachy that set the gods against the Titans. Various interpretations of the creature have been presented by scholars of classical Greece.

== Mythology ==
The term ophiotaurus is a compound derived from Ancient Greek ὄφῐς óphis, meaning "snake", and ταῦρος taûros, meaning "bull".

The Ophiotaurus is said to be a creature with the front half of a bull and the back half of a serpent. The only known writing featuring the Ophiotaurus is Fasti by Ovid. Here, Ovid describes the types of monstra that are threats to both men and gods. Ovid contrasts the Ophiotaurus with the immania monstra, the terrifying monsters. The poem describes a prophecy telling that whoever burns the Ophiotarurus will defeat the gods. It depicts Briareus, one of the 100-handed Hecatoncheires, killing the Ophiotaurus in an attempt to burn its innards only to be stopped by birds sent by Zeus. Book Three of Fasti reads:

There was a bull, a marvelous monster, born of Mother Earth, the hind part of which was of serpent-form: warned by the three Fates, grim Styx had imprisoned him in dark woods, surrounded by triple walls. There was a prophecy that whoever burnt the entrails of the bull, in the flames, would defeat the eternal gods. Briareus sacrificed it with an adamantine axe, and was about to set the innards on the flames: but Jupiter ordered the birds to snatch them: and the Kite brought them, and his service set him among the stars.

— Ovid, Fasti, Book III

The only other known depiction of the Ophiotaurus is a mosaic that was excavated in York.

== Scholarly analysis ==
The Ophiotaurus had a prominent role in the Titanomachy, the conflict between the gods and the Titans. English professor John E. Curran Jr. describes the Ophiotaurus as one of the more overt examples of a text challenging the invulnerability of the gods and presenting them as fearful. Classics professor Peter Kelly suggests that the Ophiotaurus is Ovid's interpretation of the ideas of Empedocles, who posited that most primordial creatures were hybrids. In this sense, the Ophiotaurus returns scientific and philosophical thinking to the realm of myth. He also compares the Ophiotaurus to Achelous, a river god who can transform into a snake and a bull, but not both at once.

== In popular culture ==
- The Ophiotaurus appears in the fantasy novel The Titan's Curse by Rick Riordan.
- An Ophiotaurus appears in the My Little Pony: Friendship Is Magic episode "Frenemies".
- An Ophiotaurus named Opie appears in the Krapopolis episode "Ice Week", voiced by Ebon Moss-Bachrach.
- An Ophiotaurus appears in a few books in the Beware of Chicken series, by Casualfarmer.
- The Bolt of Ophiotaurus, which temporarily removes the invulnerability of a deity if shot in its eye, is referenced in book 3 of the Dungeon Crawler Carl book series.

== See also ==
- Horned Serpent
