= William Sale =

William Sale may refer to:

- William Sale Jr., professor of English at Cornell University
- William W. Sale, mayor of Charleston, South Carolina
