= Uranus (mythology) =

Personification of the sky in Greek mythology

- Personification of the sky
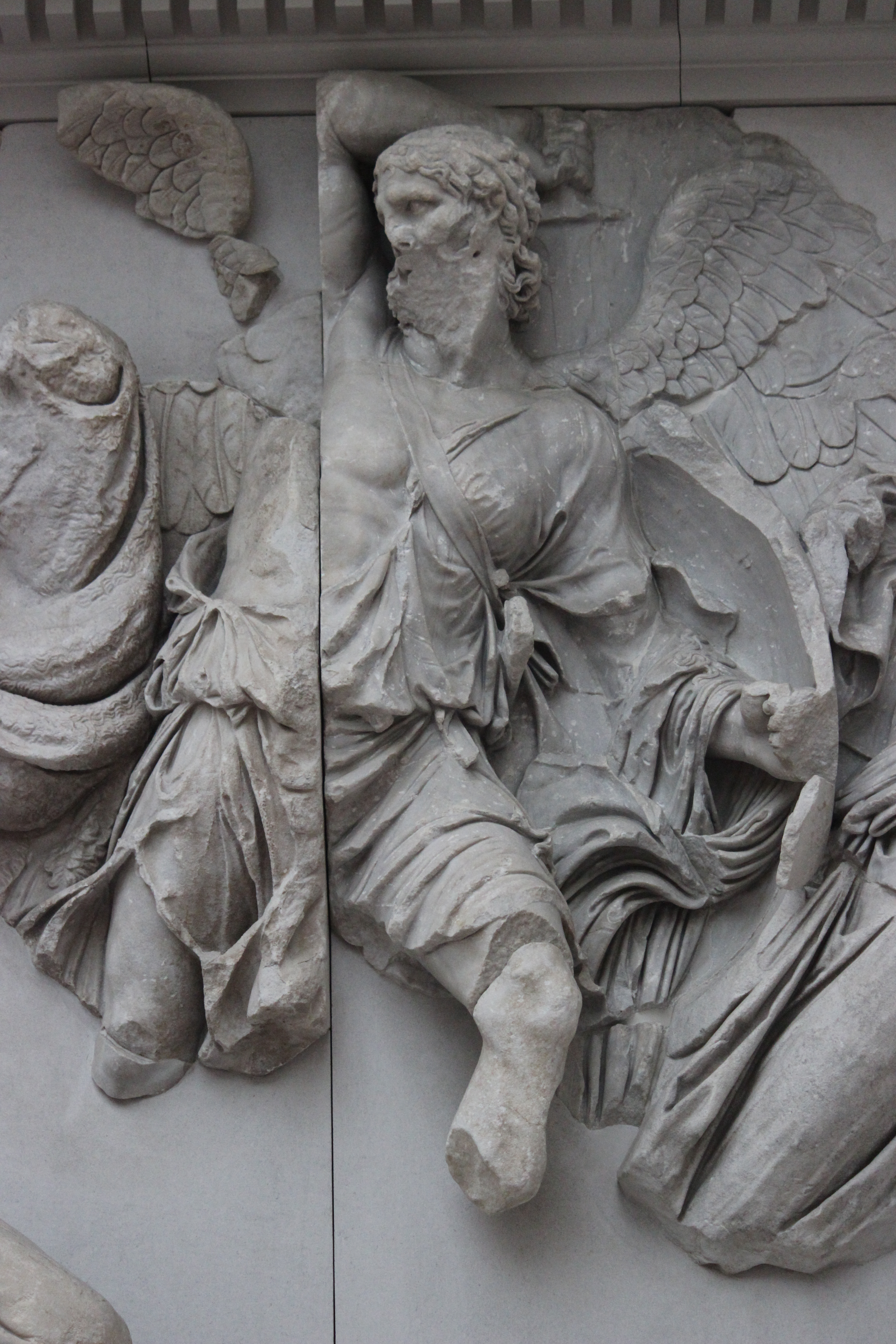
- Uranus depicted on the Gigantomachy frieze, Pergamon Altar, Pergamon Museum
- Abode: Sky

Genealogy
- Parents: Gaia (Hesiod)
- Siblings: Pontus and the Ourea (Hesiod)
- Consort: Gaia
- Children: The Titans, the Cyclopes, the Hecatoncheires, the Erinyes (Furies), the Giants, the Meliae, and Aphrodite

Equivalents
- Roman: Caelus

In Greek mythology, Uranus ( /jʊˈreɪnəs/ yoo-RAY-nəs), sometimes written Ouranos (Ancient Greek: Οὐρανός, lit. 'sky', [uːranós]), is the personification of the sky and one of the Greek primordial deities. According to Hesiod, Uranus was the son and husband of Gaia (Earth), with whom he fathered the first generation of Titans. However, no cult addressed directly to Uranus survived into classical times, and Uranus does not appear among the usual themes of Greek painted pottery. Elemental Earth, Sky, and Styx might be joined, however, in solemn invocation in Homeric epic. The translation of his name in Latin is Caelus.

== Etymology ==
Most linguists trace the etymology of the name Οὐρανός to a Proto-Greek form *Worsanós (Ϝορσανός), enlarged from *ṷorsó- (also found in Greek οὐρέω (ouréō) 'to urinate', Sanskrit varṣá 'rain', Hittite ṷarša- 'fog, mist'). The basic Indo-European root is *ṷérs- 'to rain, moisten' (also found in Greek eérsē 'dew', Sanskrit várṣati 'to rain', or Avestan aiβi.varəšta 'it rained on'), making Ouranos the "rain-maker", or the "lord of rain".

A less likely etymology is a derivative meaning 'the one standing on high' from PIE *ṷérso- (cf. Sanskrit várṣman 'height, top', Lithuanian viršùs 'upper, highest seat', Russian verh 'height, top'). Of some importance in the comparative study of Indo-European mythology is the contested identification by Georges Dumézil (1934) of Uranus with the Vedic deity Váruṇa (Mitanni Aruna), god of the sky and waters, but the etymological equation is now considered untenable.

== Genealogy ==
In Hesiod's Theogony, which came to be accepted by the Greeks as the "standard" account, from Gaia (Earth), the first entity to come into existence after Chaos (Void), came Uranus, the Ourea (Mountains), and Pontus (Sea).

Then, according to the Theogony, Uranus mated with Gaia, and she gave birth to the twelve Titans: Oceanus, Coeus, Crius, Hyperion, Iapetus, Theia, Rhea, Themis, Mnemosyne, Phoebe, Tethys and Cronus; the Cyclopes: Brontes, Steropes and Arges; and the Hecatoncheires ("Hundred-Handed Ones"): Cottus, Briareus, and Gyges.

Descendants of Gaia (Earth) and Uranus (Sky), according to Hesiod

Gaia | Uranus
Oceanus | Crius | Iapetus | Rhea | Mnemosyne | Tethys
Coeus | Hyperion | Theia | Themis | Phoebe | Cronus
The Titans
Brontes | Steropes | Arges
The Cyclopes
Cottus | Briareus | Gyges
The Hecatoncheires

Further, according to the Theogony, when Cronus castrated Uranus, from Uranus's blood, which splattered onto the earth, came the Erinyes (Furies), the Giants, and the Meliae. Also, according to the Theogony, Cronus threw the severed genitals into the sea, around which "a white foam spread" and "grew" into the goddess Aphrodite, although according to Homer, Aphrodite was the daughter of Zeus and Dione.

Descendants of Gaia and Uranus's blood, and Uranus's genitals, according to Hesiod

| Gaia | Uranus's blood | | Uranus's genitals |
| The Erinyes | The Giants | The Meliae | Aphrodite |

=== Other accounts ===
Other sources give Uranus other genealogies. In the lost epic poem the Titanomachy, Uranus was apparently the son of Aether, while according to others Uranus was the son of one "Acmon". According to Orphic texts, Uranus (along with Gaia) was the offspring of Nyx (Night) and Phanes.

The poet Sappho (c. 630–570 BCE) was said to have made Uranus the father of Eros, by either Gaia, according to one source, or Aphrodite, according to another.

The mythographer Apollodorus, gives a slightly different genealogy from Hesiod's. Without mentioning any ancestors, he begins his account by saying simply that Uranus "was the first who ruled over the whole world." According to Apollodorus, the Titans (instead of being Uranus's firstborn as in Hesiod) were born after the three Hundred-Handers and the three Cyclopes, and there were thirteen original Titans, adding the Titanide Dione to Hesiod's list.

Passages in a section of the Iliad called the Deception of Zeus suggest the possibility that Homer knew a tradition in which Oceanus and Tethys (rather than Uranus and Gaia, as in Hesiod) were the parents of the Titans. Plato, in his Timaeus, provides a genealogy (probably Orphic) which perhaps reflected an attempt to reconcile this apparent divergence between Homer and Hesiod, with Uranus and Gaia as the parents of Oceanus and Tethys, and Oceanus and Tethys as the parents of Cronus and Rhea and the other Titans.

In Roman mythology, Uranus's counterpart was Caelus (Sky). Cicero says Caelus was the offspring of Aether and Dies (Day), and that Caelus and Dies were the parents of Mercury (Hermes). Hyginus says that, in addition to Caelus, Aether and Dies were also the parents of Terra (Earth), and Mare (Sea).

== Mythology ==
=== Castration and overthrow ===
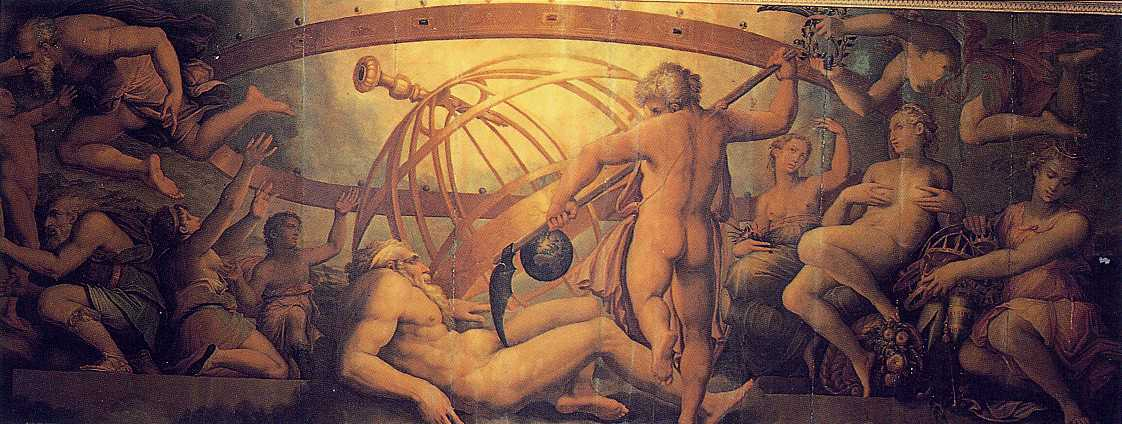
The Mutilation of Uranus by Saturn: fresco by Giorgio Vasari and Cristofano Gherardi, c. 1560 (Sala di Cosimo I, Palazzo Vecchio)

As Hesiod tells the story, Gaia "first bore starry Heaven [Uranus], equal to herself, to cover her on every side, and to be an ever-sure abiding-place for the blessed gods." Then, with Gaia, Uranus produced eighteen children: the twelve Titans, the three Cyclopes, and the three Hecatoncheires (Hundred-Handers), but hating them, he hid them away somewhere inside Gaia. Angry and in distress, Gaia fashioned a sickle made of adamant and urged her children to punish their father. Only her son Cronus, the youngest Titan, was willing to do so. So Gaia hid Cronus in "ambush", giving him the adamantine sickle, and when Uranus came to lie with Gaia, Cronus reached out and castrated his father, casting the severed testicles into the sea. Uranus's castration allowed the Titans to rule and Cronus to assume supreme command of the cosmos.

For this "fearful deed", Uranus called his sons "Titans (Strainers) in reproach" and said that "vengeance for it would come afterwards." According to Hesiod, from the blood that spilled from Uranus onto the Earth came forth the Giants, the Erinyes (the avenging Furies), and the Meliae (the ash-tree nymphs). From the genitals in the sea came forth Aphrodite. According to some accounts, the mythical Phaeacians, visited by Odysseus in the Odyssey, were also said to have sprung from the blood of Uranus's castration.

Various sites have been associated with Cronus's sickle, and Uranus's castration. Two of these were on the island of Sicily. According to the Alexandrian poet Callimachus (c. 270 BC), Cronus's sickle was buried at Zancle in Sicily, saying that it was "hidden in a hollow under the ground" there. The other Sicilian site is Drepanum (modern Trapani), whose name is derived from the Greek word for "sickle". Another Alexandrian poet, Lycophron (c. 270 BC), mentions "rounding the Cronos' Sickle's leap", an apparent reference to the "leap" of the sickle being thrown into the sea at Drepanum.

However, other sites were also associated with the sickle. The geographer Pausanias, reports that the sickle was said to have been thrown into the sea from the cape near Bolina, not far from Argyra on the coast of Achaea, and says that "For this reason they call the cape Drepanum". The historian Timaeus located the sickle at Corcyra, which the islanders claimed to be Phaeacia, the island home of the Phaeacians, who (as noted above) were said to have been born from the blood of Uranus's castration.

After his castration, Uranus recedes into the background. Uranus plays no further role in Greek mythology beyond the tradition that he and Gaia (now reconciled?) warned their son Cronus that he was destined to be overthrown by one of his children, advised their daughter Rhea, Cronus's wife, to go to Lyctus on Crete to give birth to Zeus, so that Zeus would be saved from Cronus, and advised Zeus to swallow his first wife Metis, so that Zeus would not in turn be overthrown by his son. He is, however, identified on the Gigantomachy frieze on the Pergamon Altar, bearded and winged, fighting against the Giants with a sword, not too far from his daughter Themis, who is seen attacking another Giant.

=== The sky (ouranos) ===
After his castration, the Sky came no more to cover the Earth at night, but held to its place, and, according to Carl Kerényi, "the original begetting came to an end". Uranus was scarcely regarded as anthropomorphic, aside from the genitalia in the castration myth. He was simply the sky, which was conceived by the ancients as an overarching dome or roof of bronze, held in place (or turned on an axis) by the Titan Atlas. In formulaic expressions in the Homeric poems ouranos is sometimes an alternative to Olympus as the collective home of the gods; an obvious occurrence would be the moment in Iliad 1.495, when Thetis rises from the sea to plead with Zeus: "and early in the morning she rose up to greet Ouranos-and-Olympus and she found the son of Kronos ...".

William Sale remarks that "... 'Olympus' is almost always used [as the home of the Olympian gods], but ouranos often refers to the natural sky above us without any suggestion that the gods, collectively, live there". Sale concluded that the earlier seat of the gods was the actual Mount Olympus, from which the epic tradition by the time of Homer had transported them to the sky, ouranos. By the sixth century, when a "heavenly Aphrodite" (Aphrodite Urania) was to be distinguished from the "common Aphrodite of the people", ouranos signifies purely the celestial sphere itself.

== Comparative mythology ==
=== Hurrian mythology ===
The Greek creation myth is similar to the Hurrian creation myth. In Hurrian religion Anu is the sky god. His son Kumarbis bit off his genitals and spat out three deities, one of whom, Teshub, later deposed Kumarbis.

=== Váruṇa ===
It is possible that Uranus was originally an Indo-European god, to be identified with the Vedic Váruṇa, the supreme keeper of order who later became the god of oceans and rivers, as suggested by Georges Dumézil, following hints in Émile Durkheim, The Elementary Forms of Religious Life (1912). Another of Dumézil's theories is that the Iranian supreme God Ahura Mazda is a development of the Indo-Iranian *vouruna-*mitra. Therefore, this divinity also has the qualities of Mitra, which is the god of the falling rain.

Georges Dumézil made a cautious case for the identity of Uranus and Vedic Váruṇa at the earliest Indo-European cultural level. Dumézil's identification of mythic elements shared by the two figures, relying to a great extent on linguistic interpretation, but not positing a common origin, was taken up by Robert Graves and others. The identification of the name Ouranos with the Hindu Váruṇa, based in part on a posited Proto-Indo-European language root *-ŭer with a sense of "binding"—ancient king god Váruṇa binds the wicked, ancient king god Uranus binds the Cyclops, who had tormented him. The most probable etymology is from Proto-Greek *(W)orsanόj (worsanos) from a Proto-Indo-European language root *ers "to moisten, to drip" (referring to the rain).

== Planet Uranus ==
The ancient Greeks and Romans knew of only five "wandering stars" (Ancient Greek: πλανῆται [planɛːtai̯]): Mercury, Venus, Mars, Jupiter, and Saturn. Following the discovery of a sixth planet in 1781 using a telescope, there was long-term disagreement regarding its name. Its discoverer William Herschel named it Georgium Sidus (The Georgian Star) after his monarch George III. This was the name preferred by English astronomers, but others, such as the French, preferred "Herschel". Finally, the name Uranus became accepted in the mid-19th century, as suggested by astronomer Johann Bode as the logical addition to the existing planets' names, since Mars (Ares in Greek), Venus (Aphrodite in Greek), and Mercury (Hermes in Greek) were the children of Jupiter, Jupiter (Zeus in Greek) the son of Saturn, and Saturn (Cronus in Greek) the son of Uranus. What is anomalous is that, while the others take Roman names, Uranus is a name derived from Greek in contrast to the Roman Caelus.
