= Titanomachy =

Ancient Greek mythic war

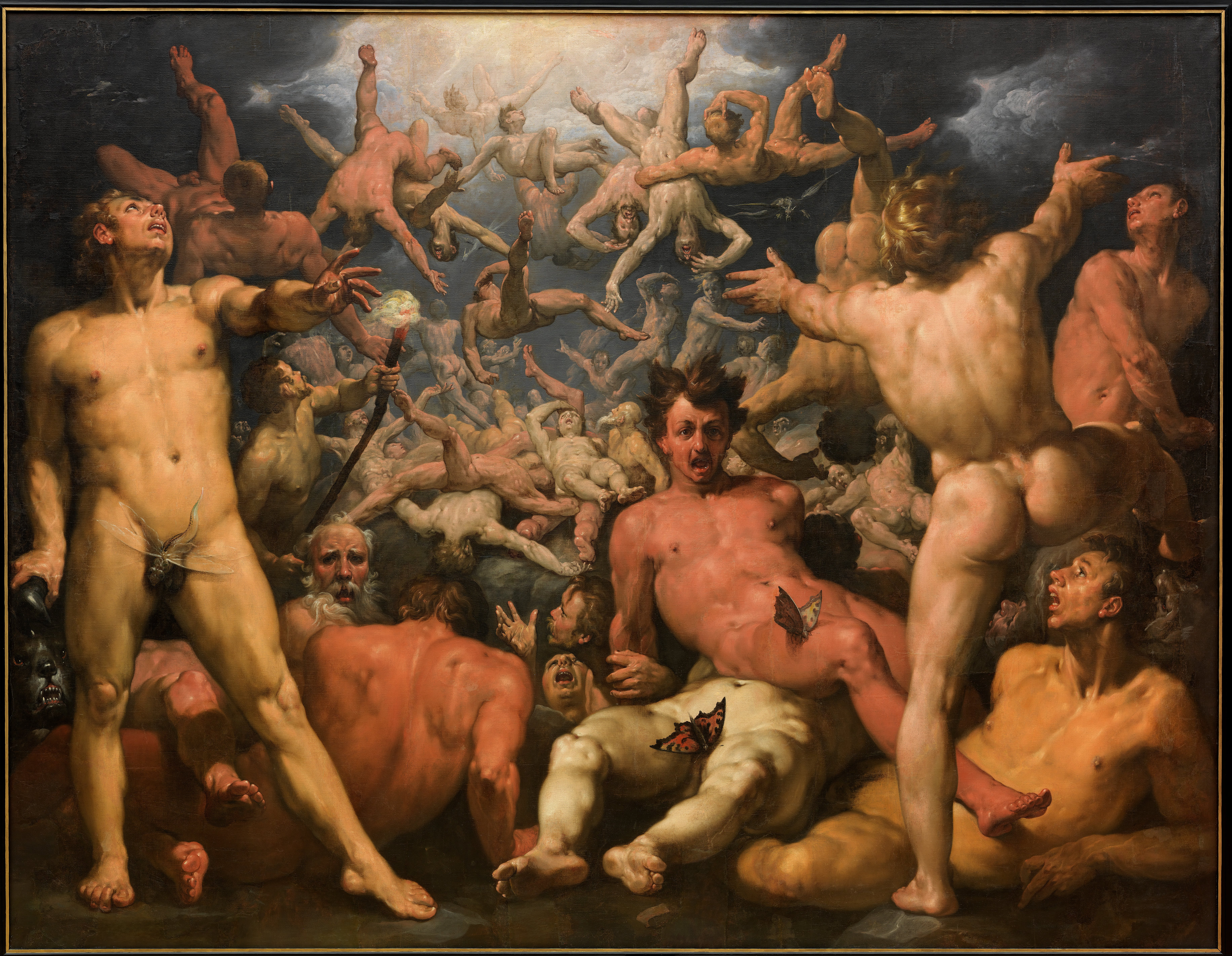
Cornelis Cornelisz van Haarlem, The Fall of the Titans, 1596–1598.

In Greek mythology, the Titanomachy (/ˌtaɪtəˈnɒməki/; Ancient Greek: Τιτανομαχία, lit. 'battle of Titans') was a ten-year war fought in ancient Thessaly, consisting of most of the Titans (the older generation of gods, based on Mount Othrys) fighting against the Olympians (the younger generations, who would come to reign on Mount Olympus) and their allies. The war was fought to decide which generation of gods would have dominion over the universe; it ended in victory for the Olympian gods. Greeks of the classical age knew of several poems about the war between the gods and many of the Titans. The dominant one, and the only one that has survived, is the Theogony attributed to Hesiod.

== Background ==
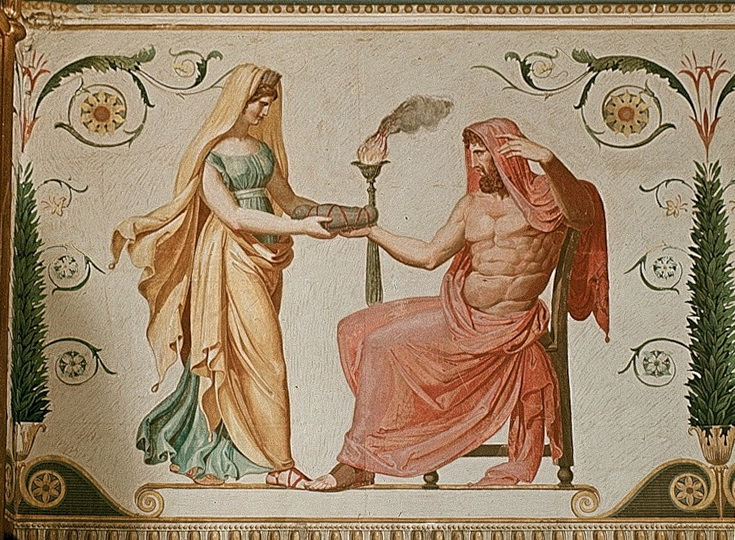
Rhea giving the rock to Cronus, 19th-century painted frieze by Karl Friedrich Schinkel.

The stage for the Titanomachy was set after the youngest Titan Cronus overthrew his own father, Uranus (the Sky), with the help of his mother, Gaia (the Earth).

Uranus drew the enmity of Gaia when he imprisoned six of her children — the three Hecatoncheires (giants with 50 heads and 100 arms) and the three Cyclopes (also giants, each with a single eye in the middle of its forehead) — within her womb. Gaia created a great sickle, forged from adamantine, and hid it in a crevice on Mount Othrys. Gaia then proceeded to attempt to convince 12 of her other children from Uranus, who were known as the Titans, to castrate Uranus. Only Cronus was willing to do the deed, so Gaia gave him the adamantine sickle and positioned him in the same crevice that previously held his sickle.

When Uranus met to consort with Gaia on Mount Othrys, Cronus ambushed Uranus, and with the adamantine sickle, sliced off his genitals, casting them across the Mediterranean. After doing so, Cronus freed the imprisoned Hecatoncheires and Cyclopes, by slicing open Gaia's womb and promptly imprisoned them in Tartarus. Cronus also quickly imprisoned Uranus deep below Tartarus. In doing this, he took his father's title of ruler of the cosmos and then secured his power by forcing his siblings to bow down to his will. But Uranus warned that Cronus's own children would rebel against his rule, just as Cronus had against him. Uranus' blood that had spilled upon the earth gave rise to the Gigantes, Erinyes, and Meliae. From the mixture of blood and semen from his mutilated genitalia, Aphrodite arose from the sea where they landed in Cyprus.

Cronus, fearing the end of his rule, now turned into the tyrant his father Uranus had once been, swallowing each of his children whole as they were born from his sister-wife Rhea. Rhea, who began to resent Cronus, managed to hide her youngest newborn child Zeus, by tricking Cronus into swallowing a magnetite rock, given to her by her mother Gaia, wrapped in a blanket instead. Rhea brought Zeus to a cave in Crete, where he was raised by Amalthea and the Meliae. Rhea's attendants, the warrior-like Kouretes, acted as bodyguards for Zeus, helping to conceal his whereabouts from his father.

Once Zeus reached adulthood, the Oceanid Metis gave Cronus an emetic, which caused him to vomit out his swallowed children, now fully grown. After freeing his siblings, as well as the Hecatoncheires and Cyclopes, Zeus led them in a war against the Titans.

== War ==
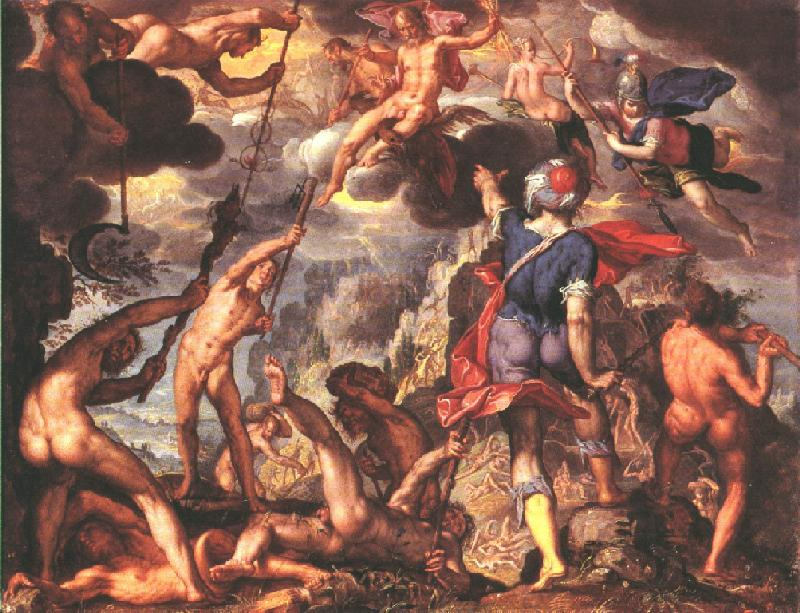
Joachim Wtewael, The Battle Between the Gods and the Titans, oil on copper, 1600

Zeus then waged a war against his father with his disgorged brothers and sisters as allies: Hestia, Demeter, Hera, Hades, and Poseidon. He released the Hecatoncheires and the Cyclopes from the earth (where they had been imprisoned by Cronus) by slaying their ward, the she-monster Campe, and they allied with him as well. The Hecatonchieres offered to hurl stones at their enemies and the Cyclopes forged for Zeus his iconic thunderbolts, for Poseidon his trident and for Hades the helmet of darkness. When Zeus took Mount Olympus as his base and called all the remaining gods to determine their allegiance, he declared that any god that chose to align with him against Cronus would preserve their honors or, if they had none, they would receive them under his rule. The first to do so was Styx, who brought her children: Nike, Zelus, Kratos, and Bia. As promised, Zeus appointed Styx as "the great oath of the gods".

Fighting on the other side allied with Cronus were the other Titans with the important exceptions of Themis and Prometheus (a son of Iapetus in Hesiod's version), who allied with the Olympians. Atlas, another son of Iapetus, was second in command after Cronus. The sisters Arke and Iris sided with the Olympians as their messenger goddesses, but while Iris remained loyal to her allies, soon Arke betrayed them for the Titans.

The war lasted ten years, but eventually Zeus and the other Olympians won. Zeus had the defeated Titans imprisoned in Tartarus much like Cronus did to his father, and the Hecatoncheires were made their guards. Atlas was given the special punishment of holding up the sky. Zeus severely punished Arke for her defection; she was deprived of her wings and cast into Tartarus as well. In some accounts, when Zeus became secure in his power, he relented and gave the Titans their freedom.

The Iliad describes how, following their victory, the three brothers divided the world amongst themselves: Zeus was given domain over the sky and the air and was recognized as the ruler of the gods. Poseidon was given the sea and all the waters, and Hades the Underworld, the realm of the dead. Each of the other gods were allotted duties according to the nature and proclivities of each. The earth was left common to all to do as they pleased, even to run counter to one another, unless the brothers (Zeus, Poseidon, and Hades) were called to intervene.

Hyginus, in his Fabulae, relates the Titanomachy differently: "After Juno (Hera) saw that Epaphus, born of a concubine, ruled such a great kingdom (Egypt), she saw to it that he should be killed while hunting, and encouraged the Titans to drive Jove (Zeus) from the kingdom and restore it to Saturn (Cronus). When they tried to mount heaven, Jupiter with the help of Minerva (Athena), Apollo, and Diana (Artemis), cast them headlong into Tartarus. On Atlas, who had been their leader, he put the vault of the sky; even now he is said to hold up the sky on his shoulders."

== Lost Titanomachy ==
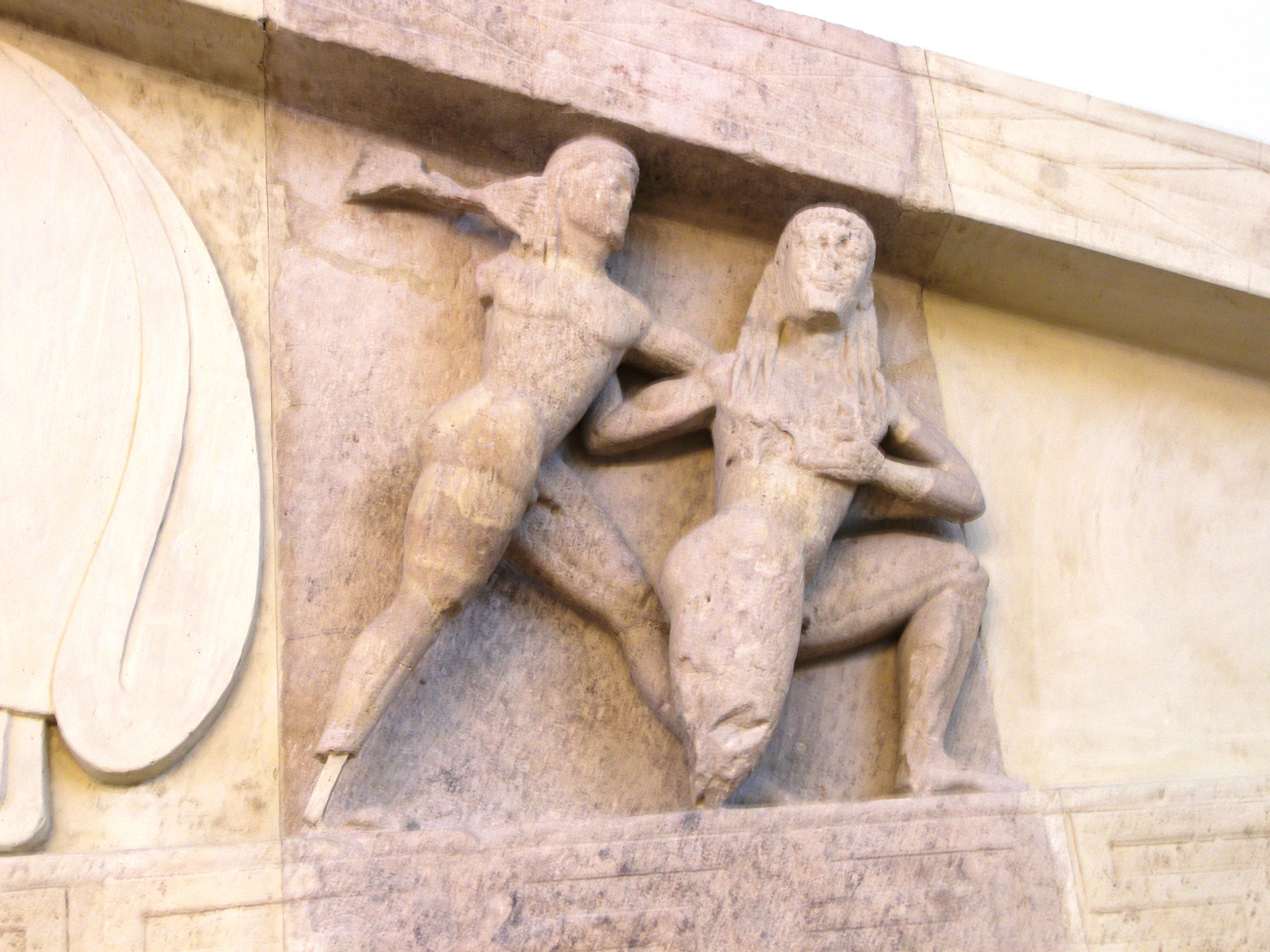
A possible Titanomachy: A beardless Zeus is depicted launching a thunderbolt against a kneeling figure (a Titan?) at the Gorgon pediment from the Temple of Artemis in Corfu as exhibited at the Archaeological Museum of Corfu.

A different account of the Titanomachy to that in Hesiod's Theogony appeared in a now-lost poem titled Titanomachy, written in the late seventh-century BC at the earliest and traditionally ascribed to Eumelus of Corinth, a semi-legendary 8th-century BC poet. Even in antiquity, many authors cited the work without an author's name; the name of Eumelos was attached to the poem as the only name available. The Titanomachy was divided into two books; the battle of the Olympians and Titans was preceded by a theogony.

== See also ==
- Gigantomachy
- Theomachy
- Æsir–Vanir War
- War in Heaven
- Deva (Hinduism)
- Asuras

== General sources ==
- Hyginus, Gaius Julius, Fabulae, in The Myths of Hyginus, edited and translated by Mary A. Grant, Lawrence: University of Kansas Press, 1960. Online version at ToposText.
- Nonnus, Dionysiaca, Volume I: Books 1–15, translated by W. H. D. Rouse, Loeb Classical Library No. 344, Cambridge, Massachusetts, Harvard University Press, 1940 (revised 1984). ISBN 978-0-674-99379-2. Online version at Harvard University Press. Internet Archive (1940).
