= Kymopoleia =

Daughter of Poseidon

In Greek mythology, Kymopoleia, Kymopolia, Cymopoleia or Cymopolia (/ˌsɪməpəˈlaɪ.ə/; Ancient Greek: Κυμοπόλεια, romanized: Kymopoleia, meaning «strength of the waves») was a daughter of the sea god Poseidon, and the wife of Briareus, one of the three Hecatoncheires. Her only known mention in Classical antiquity occurs in the Hesiodic Theogony. In his Theogony, the Byzantine scholar Tzetzes gives her parents as Poseidon and Amphitrite.
