= Fall of the Giants (Romano) =

Fresco by Giulio Romano

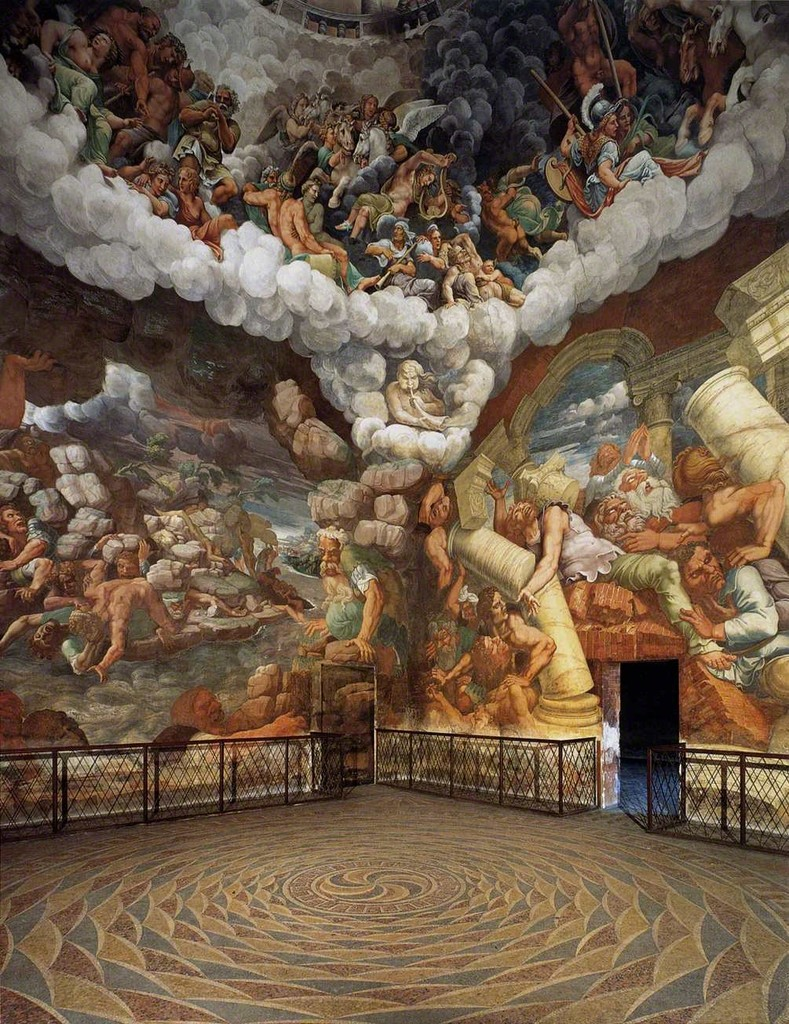
- Artist: Giulio Romano
- Year: 1532-1534
- Medium: fresco
- Location: Palazzo del Te, Mantua

The Fall of the Giants is a full room fresco from floor to ceiling done by Italian Renaissance artist and architect Giulio Romano. Romano worked on the room from 1532 to 1534. It is located in the Palazzo de Te, Mantua, which was also designed and built by Romano. It was created for his patron Federico II Gonzaga, the Duke of Mantua. The rooms of the Palazzo are said to tell the story of Ovid's Metamorphoses. Also known as the Sala dei Giganti, it is one of twenty-seven rooms covered in illusionistic frescos done by Romano. This particular room is generally praised by scholars because of Romano's unique take on the Mannerist style. Theories surrounding the purpose of this room stretch from political commentary to an exposition on Federico II Gonzaga's character, though there is no evidence that either are true.

== Description ==
The room forms a round panorama; with no beginning or end. Its singular theme absorbs the viewer into the story of the heavenly god, Jupiter away from his throne, showing his willingness to fight against the giants attack. Jupiter carries a lightning bolt, wreaking havoc against the theatrical giants. From floods, destruction and the nonchalant faces of the heavenly court, there is a strong sense of victory from the Gods. According to Giorgio Vasari, it was Romano's intention to create this illusionistic landscape of mountains and buildings collapsing, surrounded by heavy clouds driven by the winds that distorted the Giant's face in horror. When entering the Sala dei Giganti, an action scene of mid battle, is stuccoed onto the walls, bringing the viewer a sense of excitement. The limitless room is shocking and unsuspecting, unlike any other room in the Palazzo, the scene is an intimate exchange between all powerful Gods and unsuspecting giants on a battleground. In order to create an illusionistic experience Romano purposely put the viewer on the ground with the giants, who are losing the battle with the Gods. This design choice is said by scholars to be meant as an intimidation tactic for the viewer, as the patron Federico II Gonzaga wanted his visitors to be uneasy in his presence. His desire to create an overwrought environment derived from his need to prove his authority and power within Mantua. The tall ceilings accentuate the experience through an amplification of sound that allows visitors to hear the smallest sound from across the room.

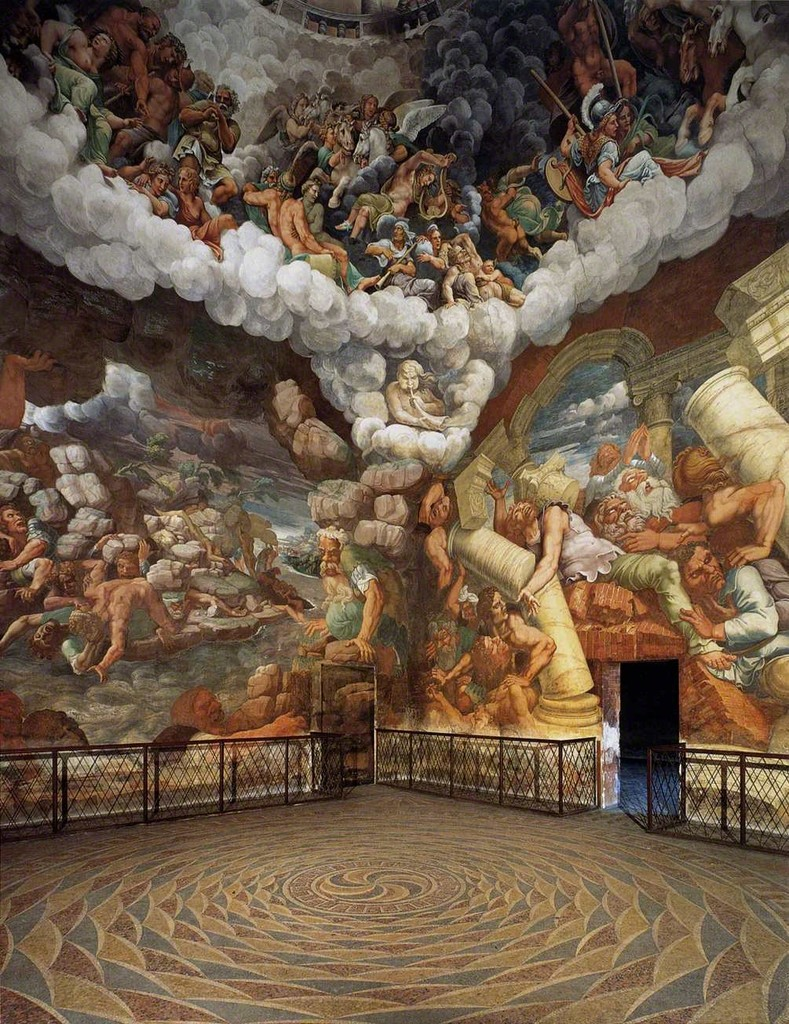
Walls of Sala dei Giganti

In many respects the Sala dei Giganti (Fall of the Giants) differs from the other rooms of the Palazzo. In areas, such as the Sala di Psyche and the Sala di Ovidio, Romano had created scenes of erotic abandon and pastoral calm but in the Sala dei Giganti the viewer is confronted with scenes of chaos and violence.

=== Sources ===
The frescos done by Giulio Romano are most likely linked with the translation of the Venetian poet Niccolò delgi Agostini which first appeared in Venice, in the year 1522. This translation became the standard for the second quarter of the 16th century. Consulting the contemporary translations of Ovid's Metamorphoses help explain the iconographic motifs in the rooms of the Palazzo de Te. This translation played an essential role in telling the Ovidian myths.

=== Iconography ===
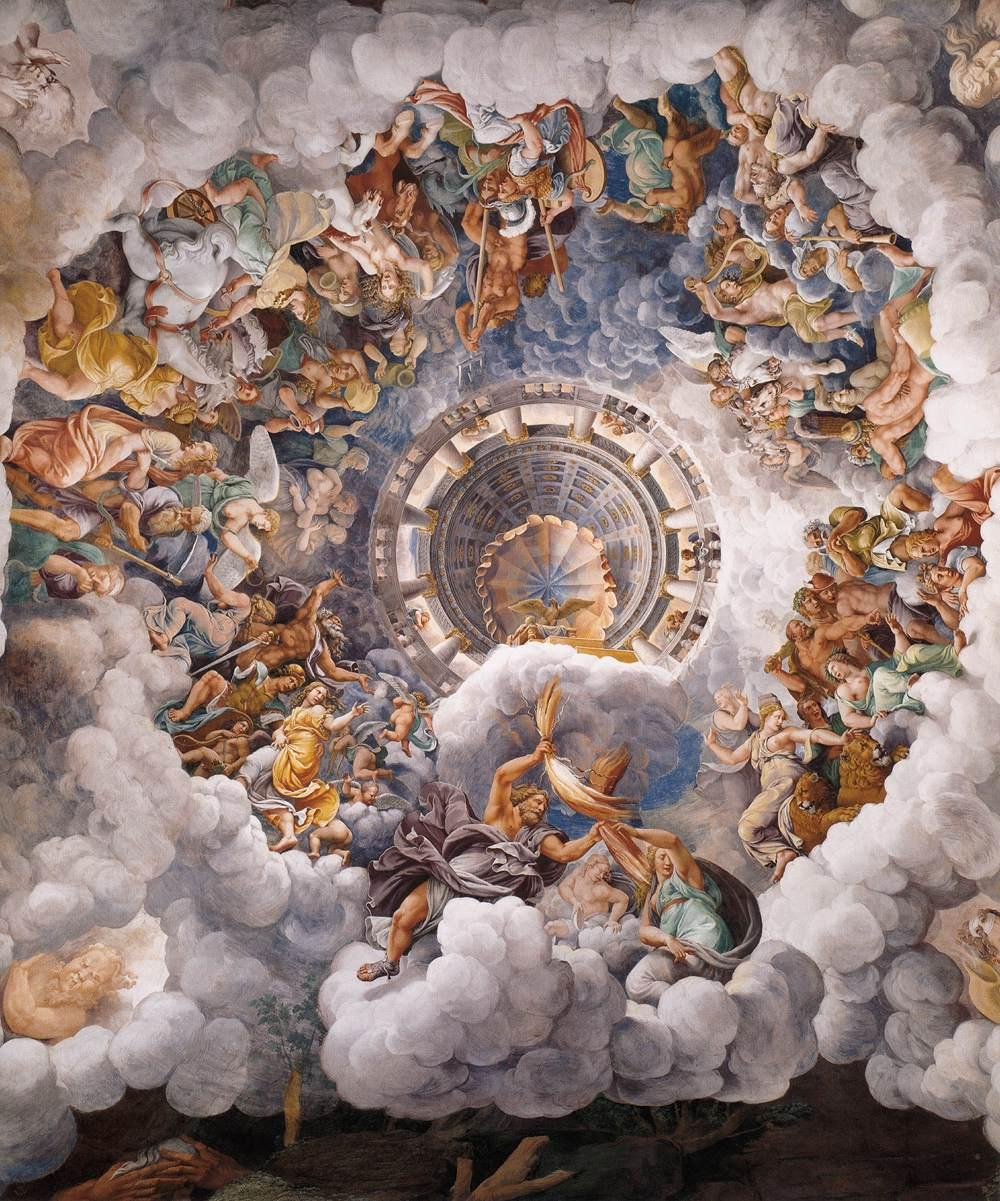
Ceiling of Sala de Giganti

To fully understand the lay out of this room, there should be an understanding that the architectural design is meant to support the story of the frescoed walls and ceiling. Romano intentionally placed slingstone throughout the floor of the room. He hid the sharp corners of the walls with a continuous scene that carries the viewer's eye around and up the walls of the room. This helped create the illusion of a panoramic scene, when in reality the viewer is standing in a four cornered room with a domed ceiling. In the Chamber of Giants, the viewer is greeted with the horrific faces of the giants in the midst of chaos and destruction. Crushed by monumental marble and natural disasters caused by Jupiter, the giants are simultaneously trying to escape. Above the fireplace, the face of Typhon, the son of Gaia (personification of Earth). He is the target of the heavenly god, Jupiter. He tries to save himself from Jupiter’s wrath by spitting fire, but to no avail, he is in seen in the midst of his defeat. To once again create an interaction with the architecture, Romano has Typhons weak attempt to attack Jupiter become a part of the fireplace below him by having the fire he spits connect with the fire in the fireplace. When looking for Typhons aggressor the viewer's eye is drawn to the heroic Jupiter, away from his throne. He places himself by Juno, Jupiter’s wife and sister, an action scene of himself actively attacking the giants who, according to the Metamorphosis, has intent to raid Mount Olympus. Jupiter is seen carrying a lightning bolt, wreaking havoc on the animated giants. As the viewer's eye continues to go up the walls to the ceiling, they are greeted with a myriad of characters. They look down, some in horror and curiosity, others in an impassive annoyance of the event below them. Notably, the Imperial eagle looks down from an umbrellaed throne from above, giving the impression that it is orchestrating the event below. While the four winds help create the chaos through their evangelical talents and menacing faces. According to other versions of the myth, Jupiter resisted the Giants' assault thanks to the intervention of Pan or of the asses of Silenus and Bacchus, but overall the scene is meant to create an unsettling atmosphere for its visitors.

== Patron ==
Done for his patron Federico II Gonzaga, the Metamorphoses was a popular subject to depict in the Cinquecento for multiple reasons. Its inherent possibilities for effective aesthetic design created a story the patron could tell to express their self-image in religion, morality, and political ideas. According to Vasari, a well known artist and historian of his time, Baldassare Castiglione was delegated by Federico II Gonzaga to procure Romano as the head artist and architect for the city of Mantua, Italy. In 1522 Romano was officially courted and in 1524, he moved to Mantua to build and decorate the interior of the Palazzo de Te and went on to build many of the cities buildings

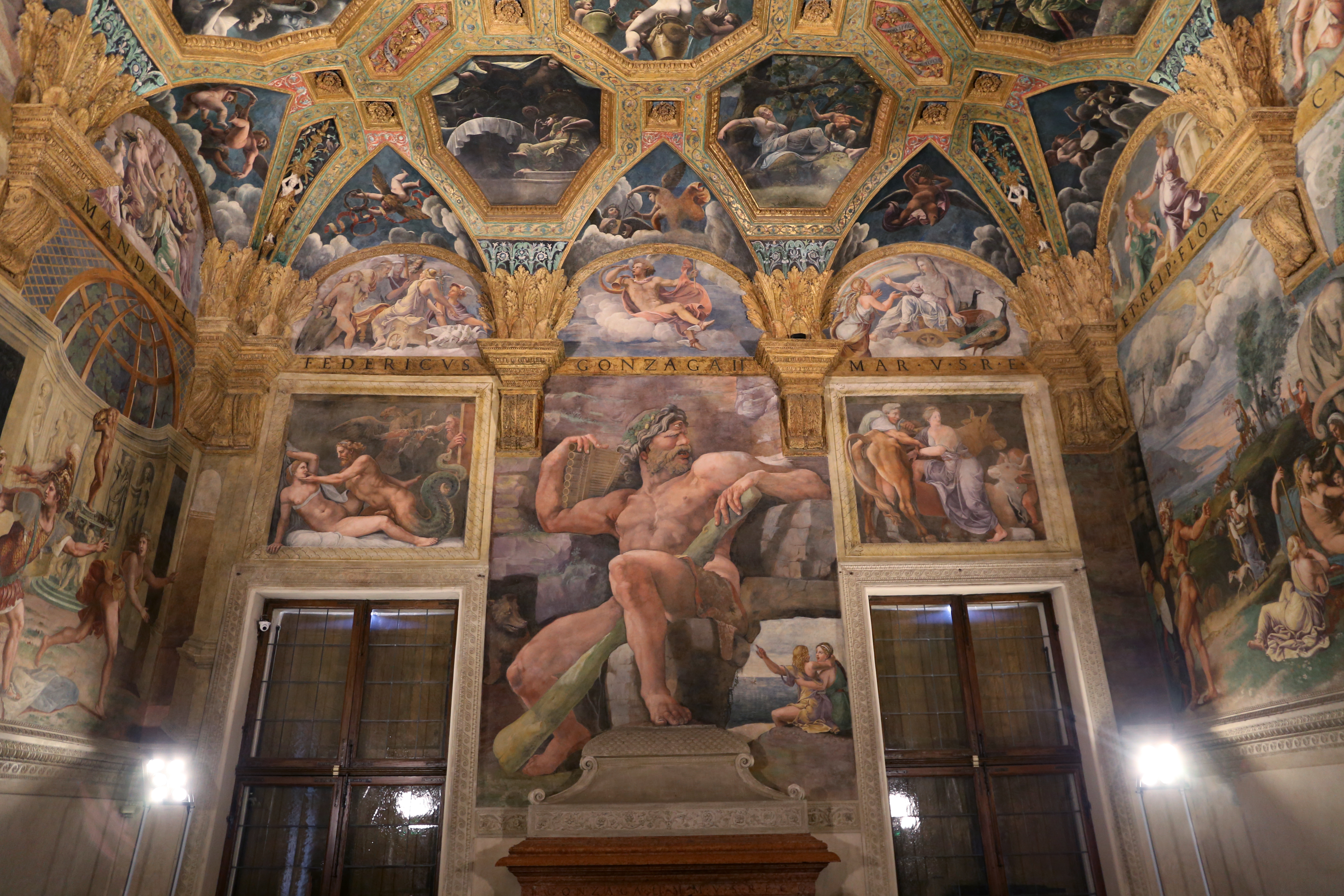
inscription of “HONESTO OCIO POST LABORES AD REPARANDAM VIRT[utem] QVIETI CONSTRVI MANDAVIT”

Palazzo de Te was built to honor and receive royal guests. In the Chamber of Psyche on the walls bordering the room it clearly states in “HONESTO OCIO POST LABORES AD REPARANDAM VIRT[utem] QVIETI CONSTRVI MANDAVIT” meaning “ordered this construction for his honest leisure after hard labours, to regain his strength in peace”). Sala dei Giganti is traditionally seen by art historians as an allegory of Giulio Romano’s criticism of the Roman Emperor Charles V and his global imperial rule. The high tension that followed the Italians Wars (1494–1559) and the limitation church and state put on political dialog, gave no safe space to critique the imperial empire at the time. This theory holds weight some weight, but for Gonzaga, the political commentary was seen by Charles V as a way of praising his imperial rule over Italy. This helped Gonzaga build a rapport with the emperor. Along with Gonzaga's military influence, the emperor made Gonzaga the Duke of Mantua. Researchers now speculate that the fresco was meant to show the patron's authority over Mantua. The room is so grand it is meant to make visitors feel small and overwhelmed by the scenes and movement that are on the surrounding walls. This created a perspective of Gonzaga as an authoritative character. Freud notes that looking deeper into the psychological aspects of Sala dei Giganti and its patron, it is easy to assume that Gonzaga wanted to prove his authority over Mantua and its people by displaying this fantastical panorama, showing his narcissistic insecurity. The need to prove himself all powerful and dedicate an entire Palazzo to his own gloriousness pushed Freud's interpretation of Gonzaga and the Sala dei Giganti.

== Mannerism ==
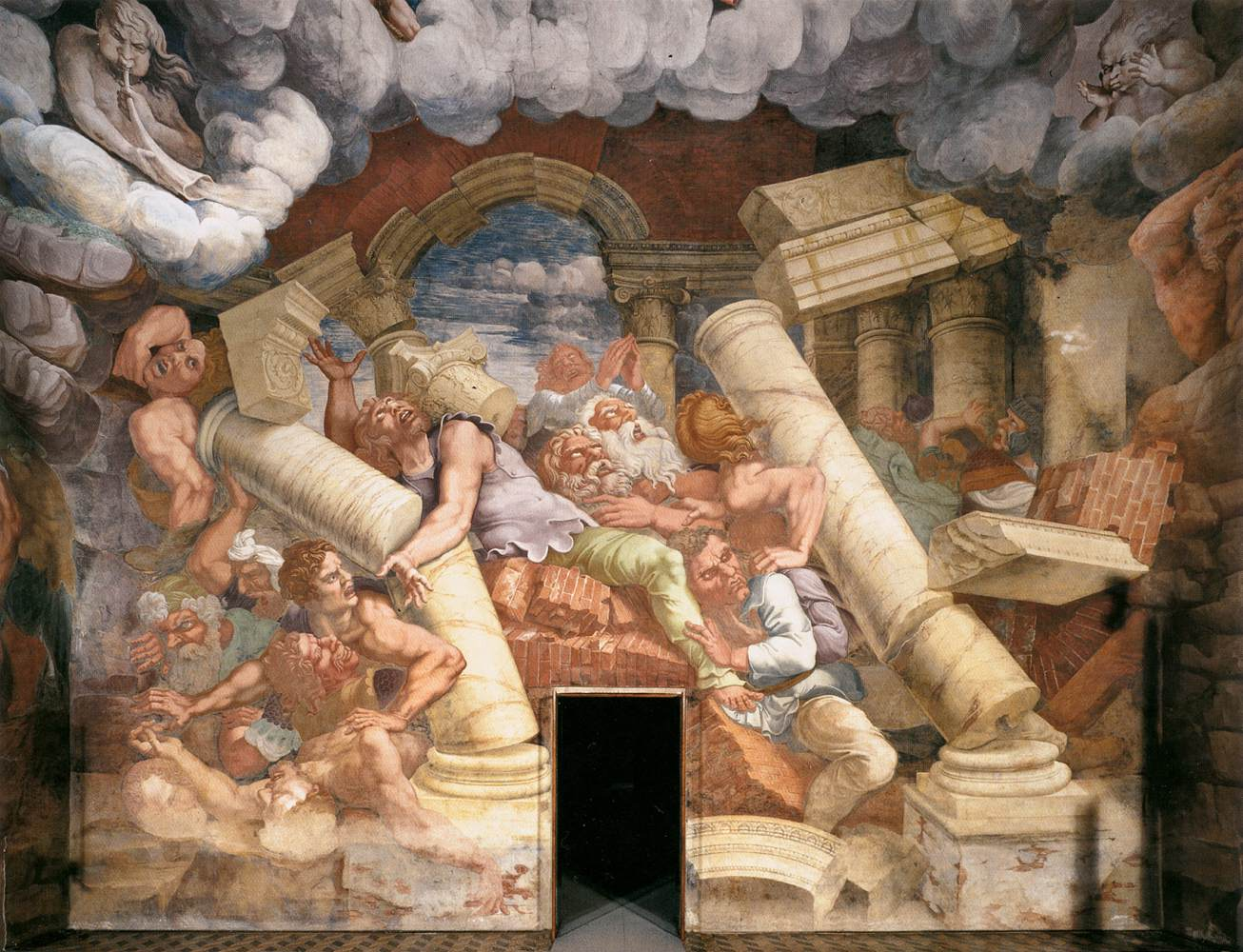

Giulio Romano's mannerist style used in his frescoes was a way to dramatize the scene depicted on the walls of Sala dei Giganti. This decision was both architectural and artistic. Mannerism is meant to blur the lines between architecture and fresco, giving the viewer the illusion of architecture that isn’t there, further embedding them into the surrounding scene. When Romano saw a flat room, he took it upon himself to create an illusionistic space to not only surprise its viewers, but to also create a space of tension and uneasiness. This style was forward thinking for many Renaissance artists. It was seen as distasteful to some. With no known classical training in this style, Romano honed it as his own. The idea of illusion was not a new concept, but Visari considered Romanos take on it as one that pushed the limits of its architecture. Without allowing the viewer to escape to reality once they entered the room, the viewer no longer is given the line between picture and frame. This made the room and Palazzo de Te unique in its own right.

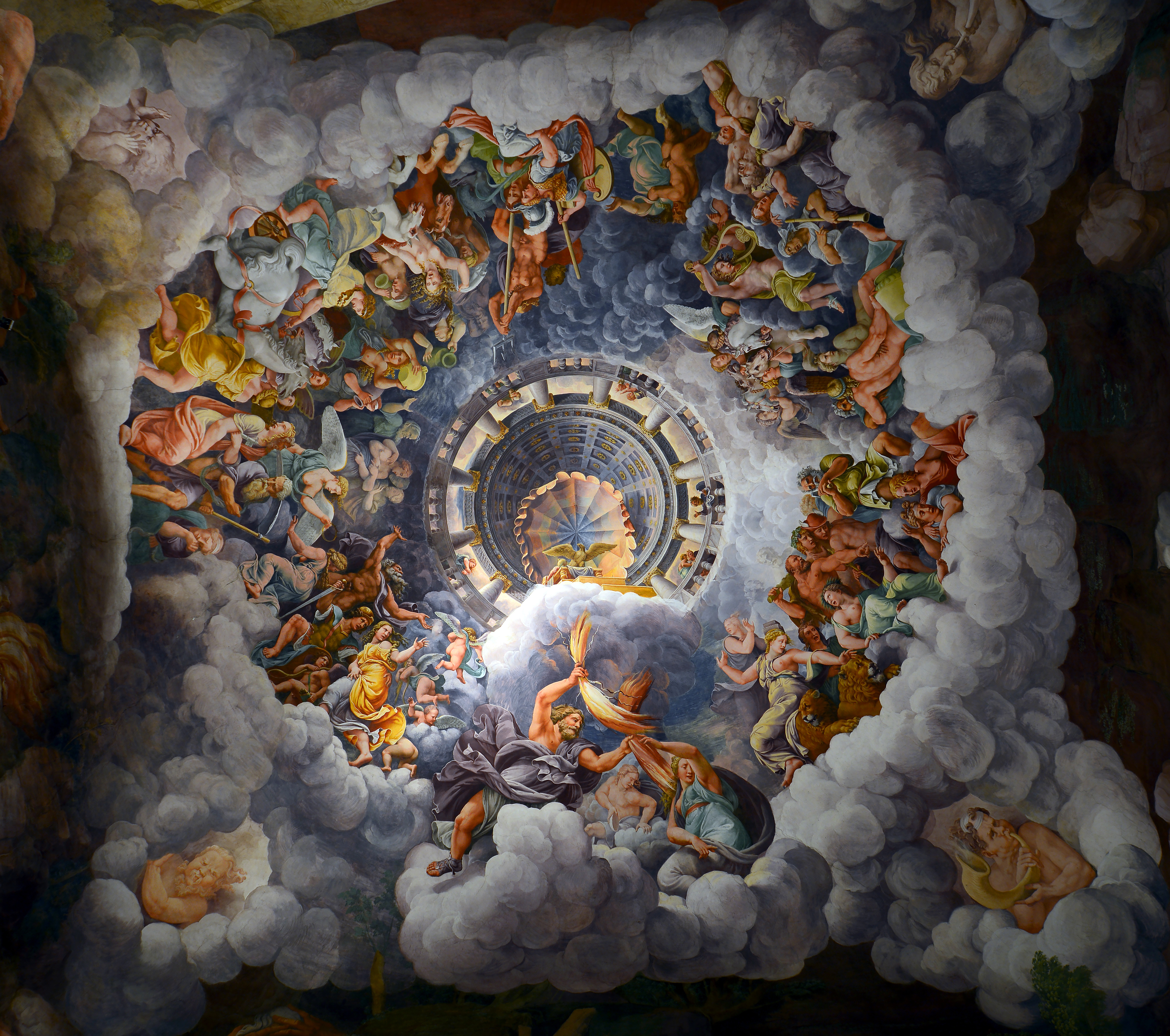

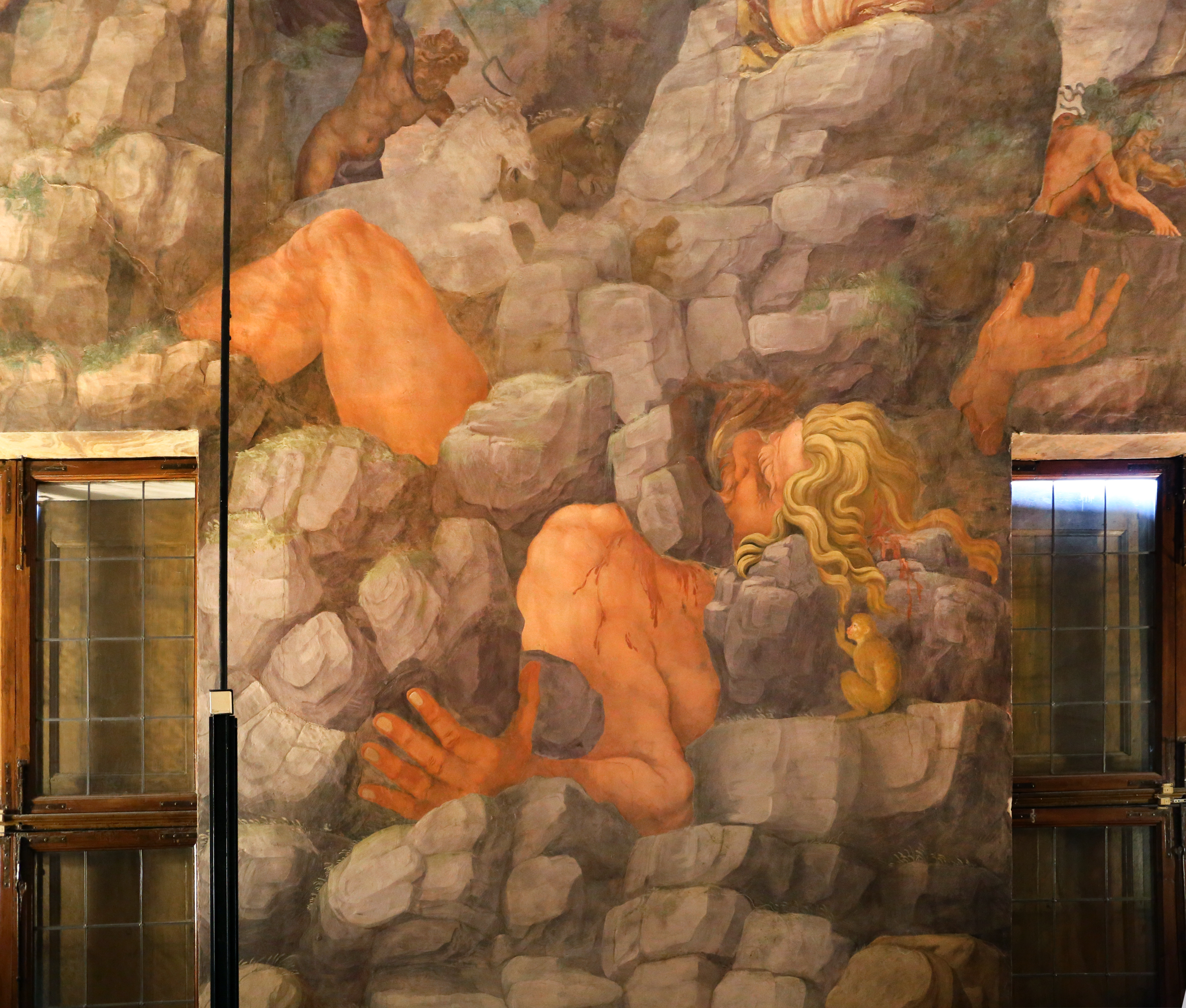

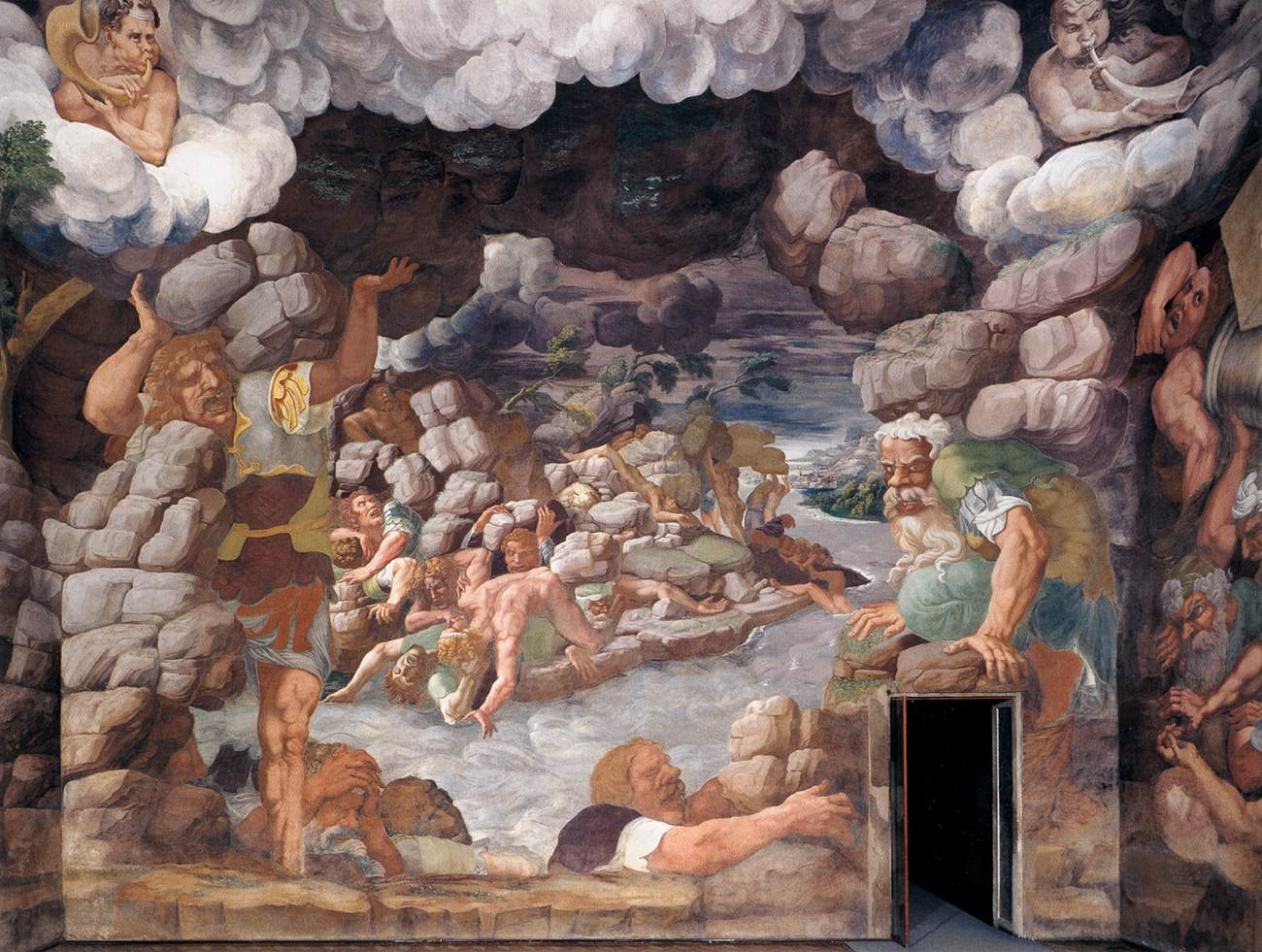

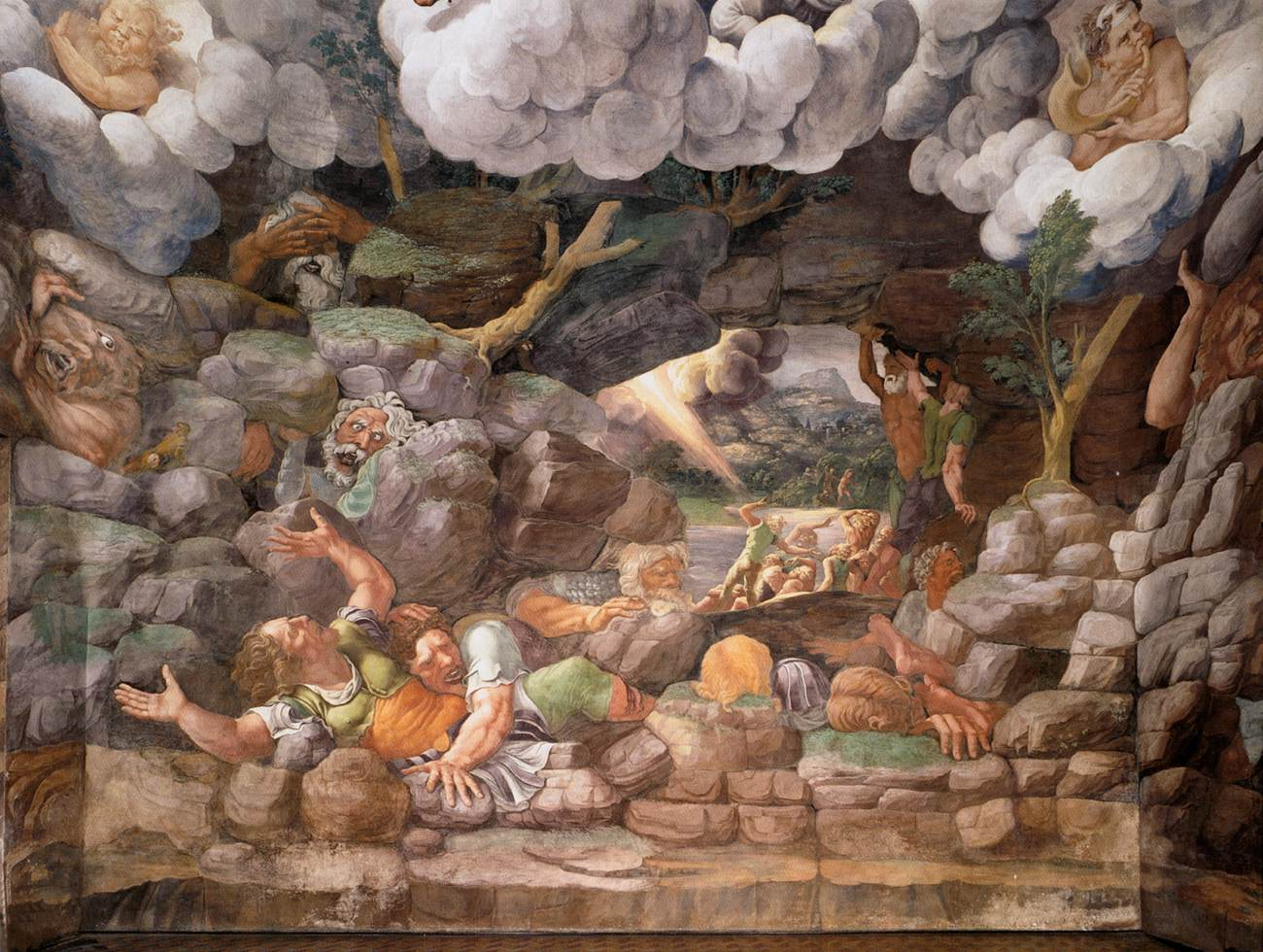

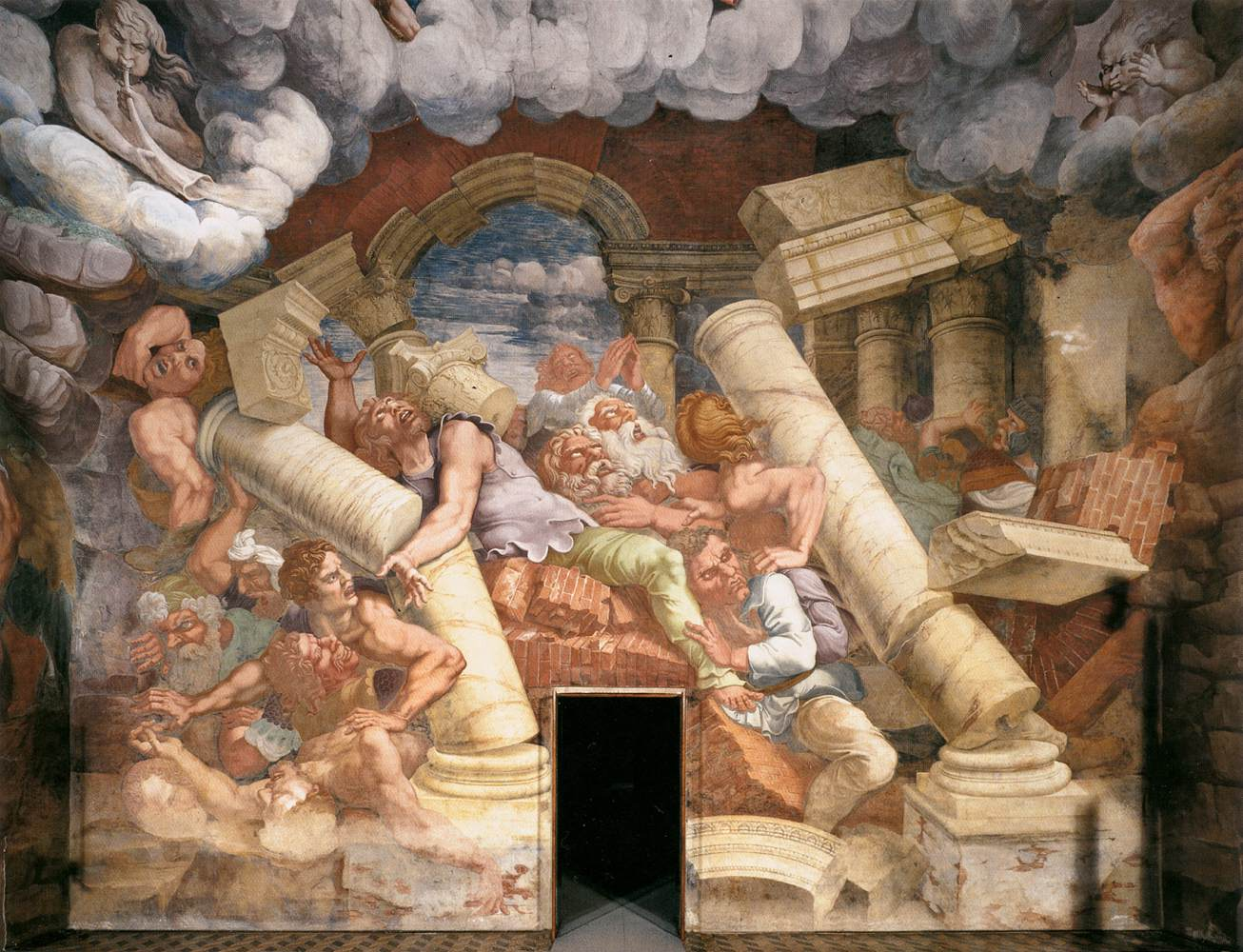

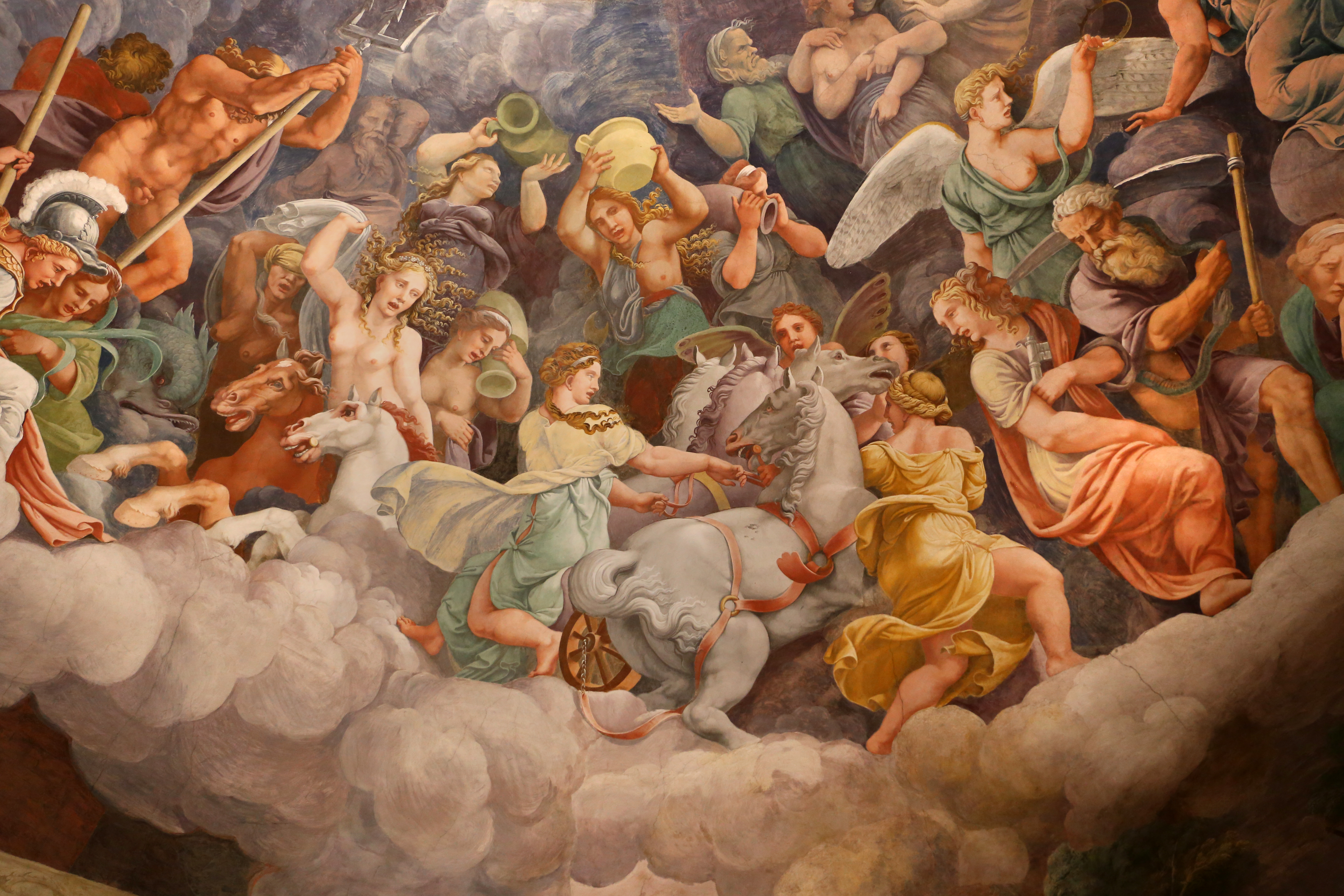

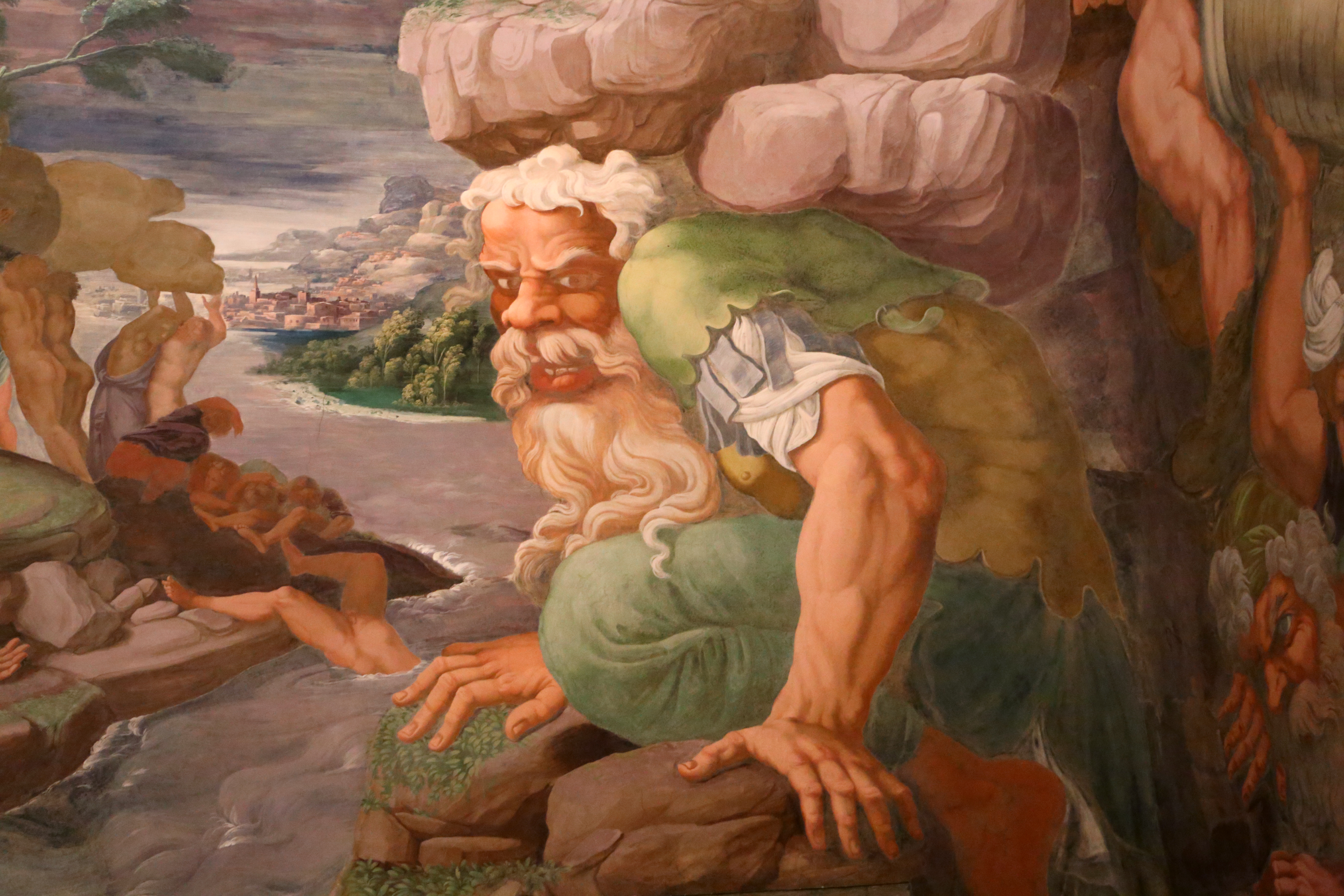

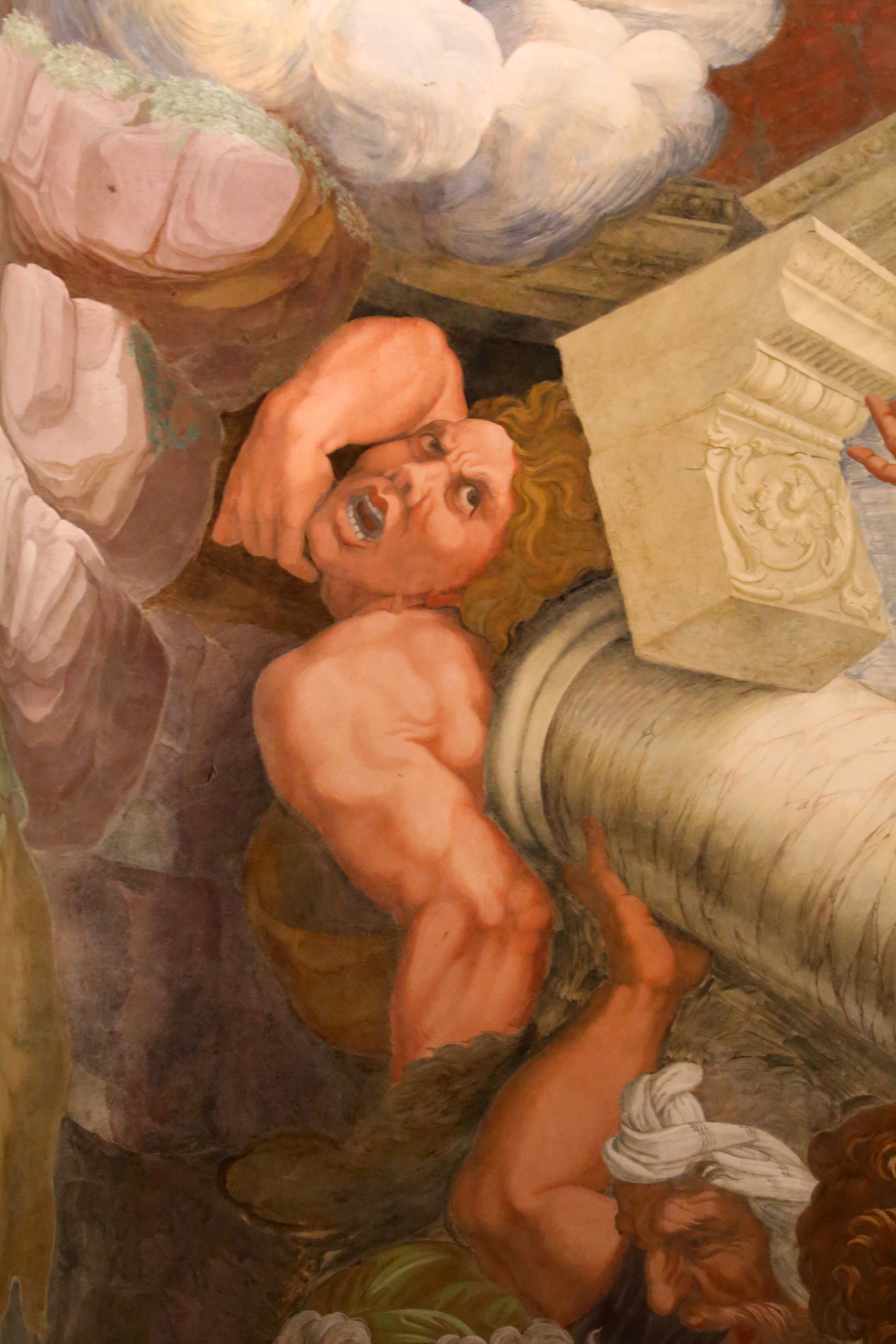

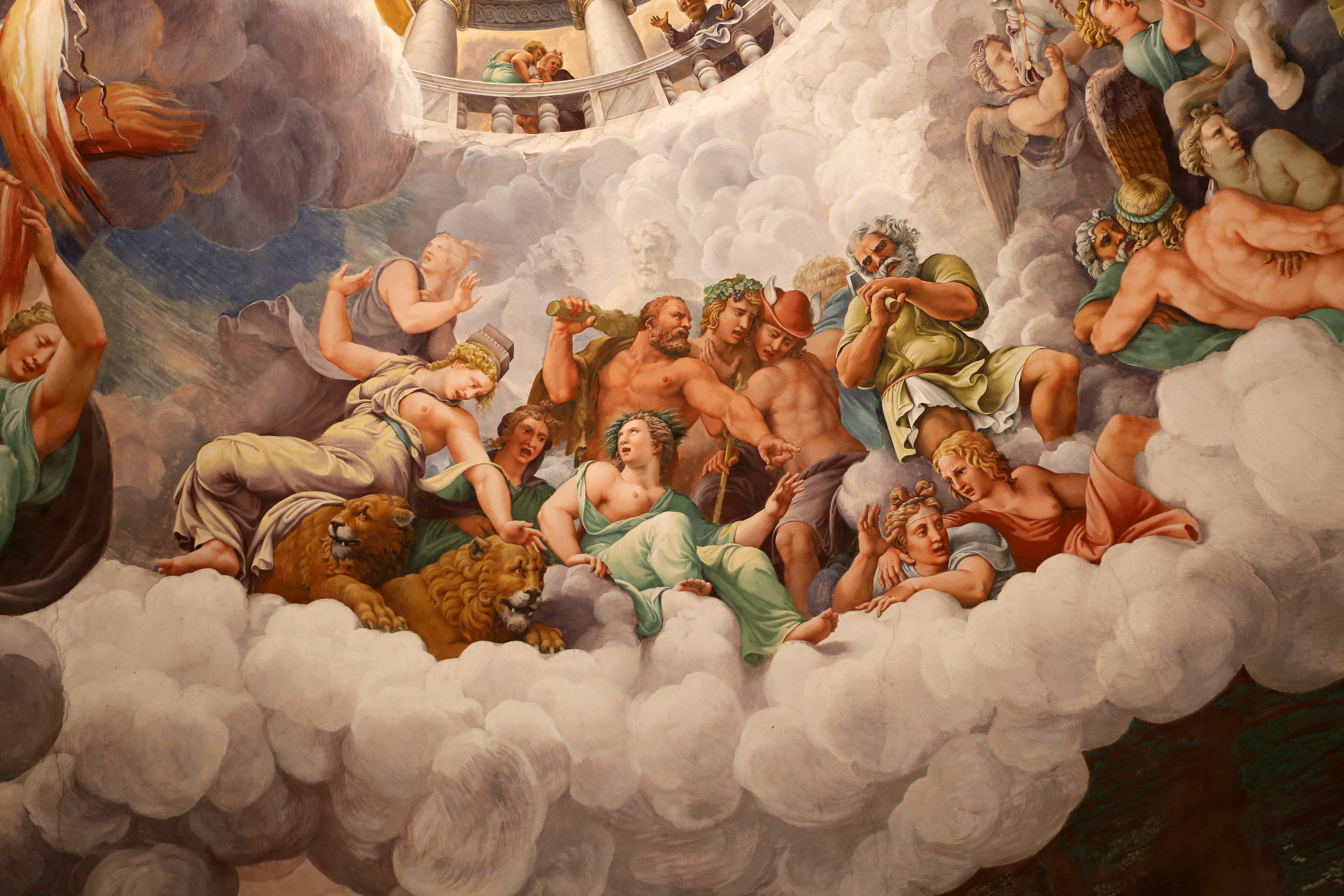

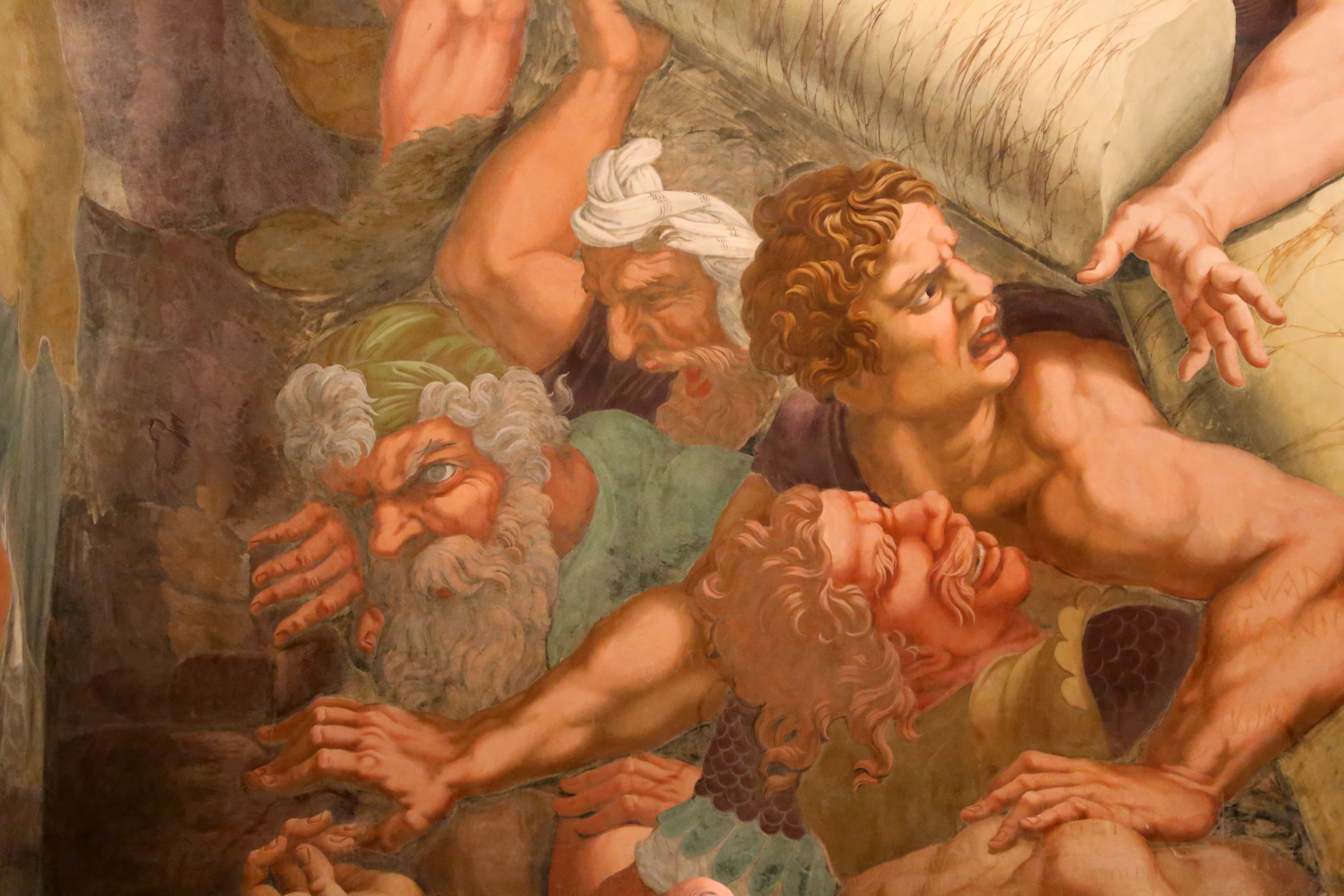

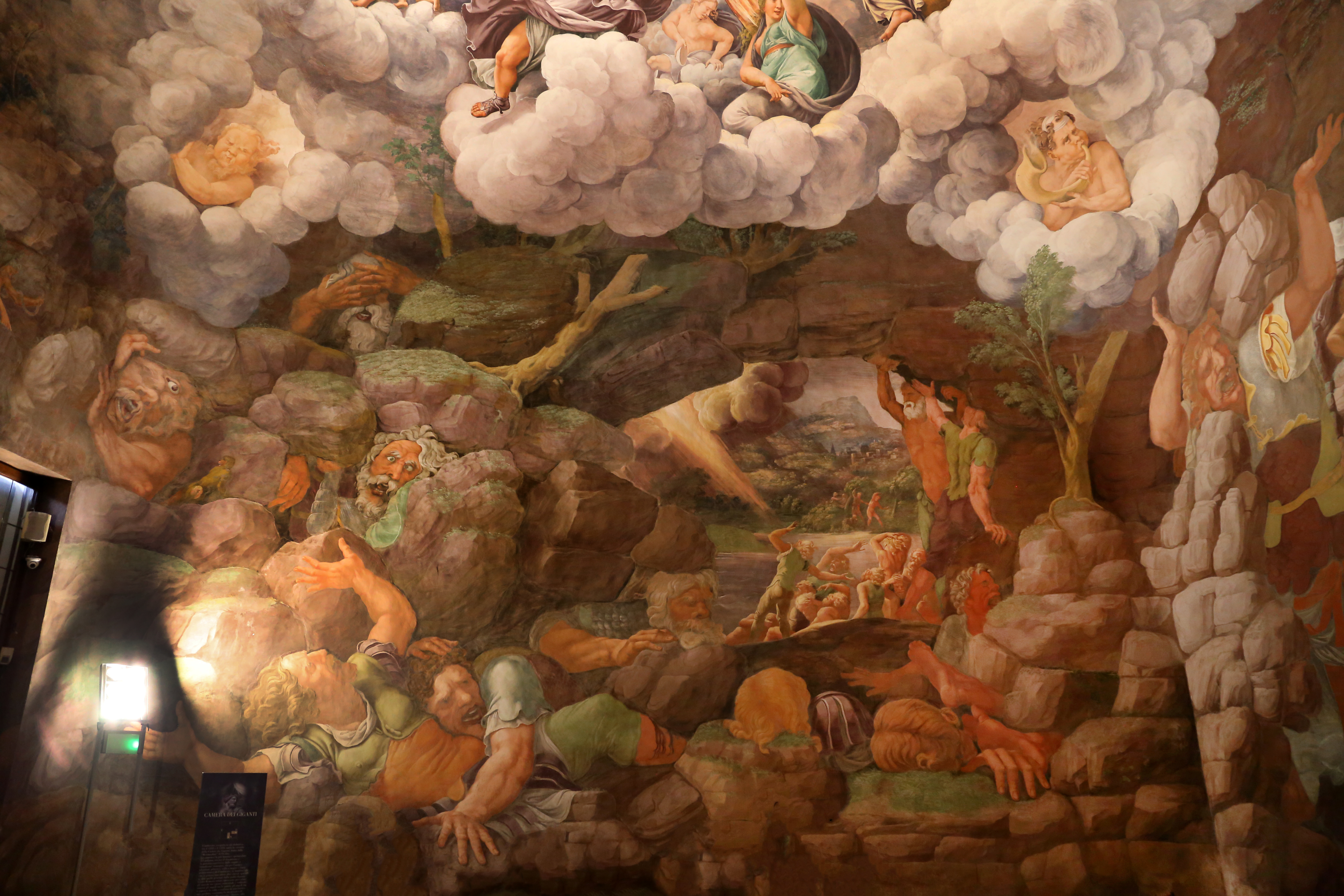

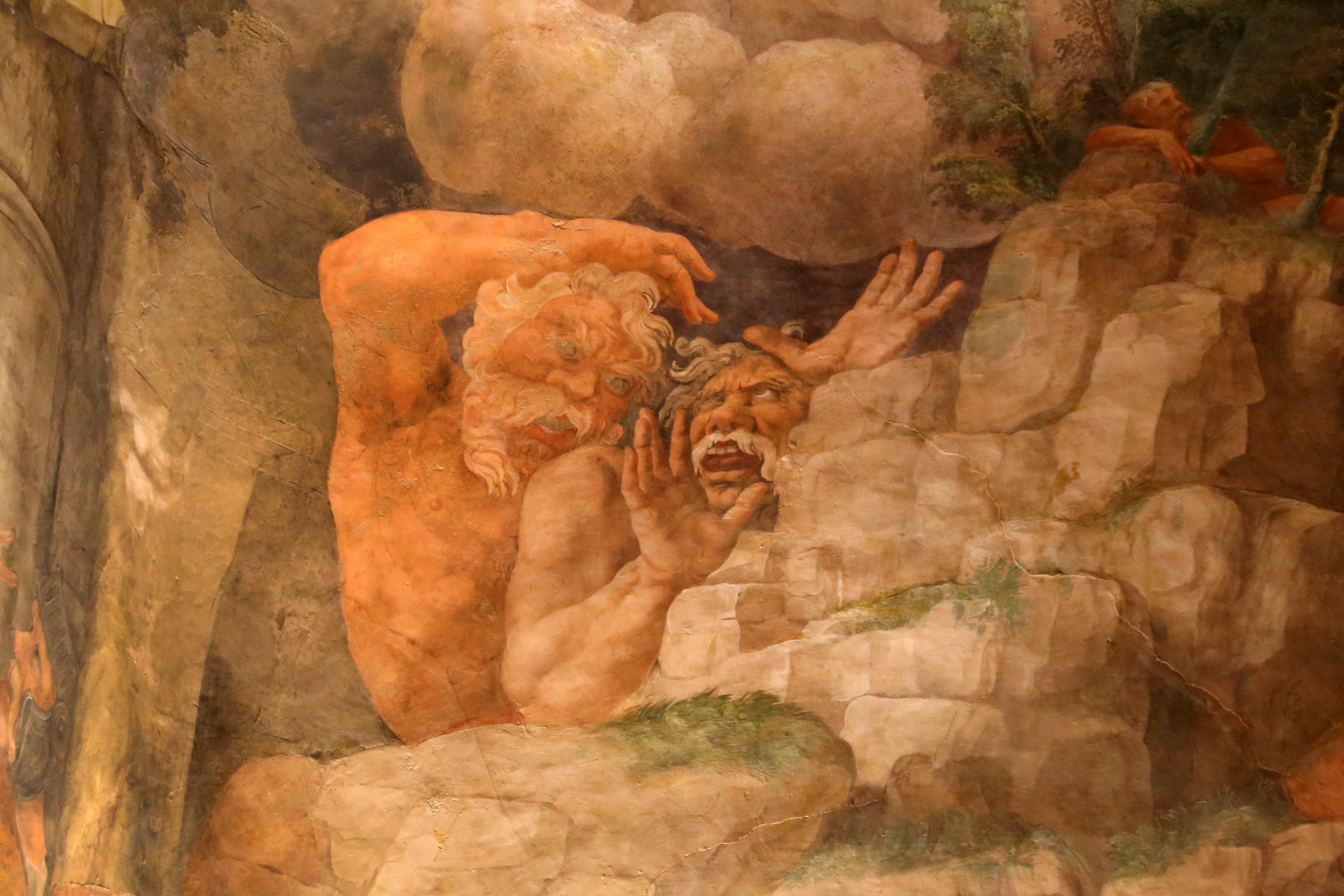

== See also ==
- 16th-century Western domes
