= William Sale Jr. =

William Merritt Sale Jr. (16 February 1899, Louisville, Kentucky — 7 January 1981, Ithaca, N. Y.) was a professor of English at Cornell University, considered an authority on 18th-century English literature.

After studying at Yale, where Chauncey Brewster Tinker directed his thesis, Sale went on to join the faculty at Cornell in 1936. Named Goldwin Smith Professor of English in 1959, he was named professor emeritus upon retirement in 1968.

From 1944 to 1960 Sale was the chief reader in English composition for the College Entrance Examination Board (CEEB).

His students at Cornell included Louis Auchincloss, Kurt Vonnegut Jr., Harold Bloom, Whitney Balliett, and Helen Vendler.

Sale had three sons: William M. 3d of St. Louis, Roger of Seattle and Kirkpatrick of New York.

== Publications ==
- 1936: Samuel Richardson: A Bibliographical Record
- 1950: Samuel Richardson, Master Printer
- 1972: Wuthering Heights by Emily Brontë; William Sale (editor). New York: Norton Critical Editions
