= Eumelus of Corinth =

Ancient Greek poet

Eumelus of Corinth (Greek: Εὔμηλος ὁ Κορίνθιος Eumelos ho Korinthios), of the clan of the Bacchiadae, is a semi-legendary 8th century BC Greek poet to whom were attributed several epic poems as well as a celebrated prosodion, the treasured processional anthem of Messenian independence that was performed on Delos. One small fragment of it survives in a quote by Pausanias. To Eumelus was also attributed authorship of several antiquarian epics composed in the Corinthian-Sicyonian cultural sphere, notably Corinthiaca, an epic narrating the legends and early history of his home city Corinth. The Corinthiaca is now lost, but a written version of it was used by Pausanias in his survey of the antiquities of Corinth.

The epics Europia, Bougonia (perhaps the same as Europia), Titanomachy, and Return from Troy (one of the Nostoi) were also ascribed to Eumelus by various later authors. Eumelus was traditionally dated between 760 and 740 BC. According to Martin West the epics appear to have been composed in the late seventh or sixth century BC, later than the date traditionally ascribed to Eumelus in the Greek chronographic tradition used, for instance, by Eusebius of Caesarea.

== Sources ==
- West, M. L. (2002), "'Eumelos': A Corinthian Epic Cycle?" in The Journal of Hellenic Studies, vol. 122, pp. 109–133. JSTOR 3246207.
- West, M. L. (2003), Greek Epic Fragments: From the Seventh to the Fifth Centuries BC, edited and translated by Martin L. West, Loeb Classical Library No. 497, Cambridge, Massachusetts, Harvard University Press, 2003. ISBN 978-0-674-99605-2. Online version at Harvard University Press.
