= Titanomachy (epic poem) =

Lost epic poem

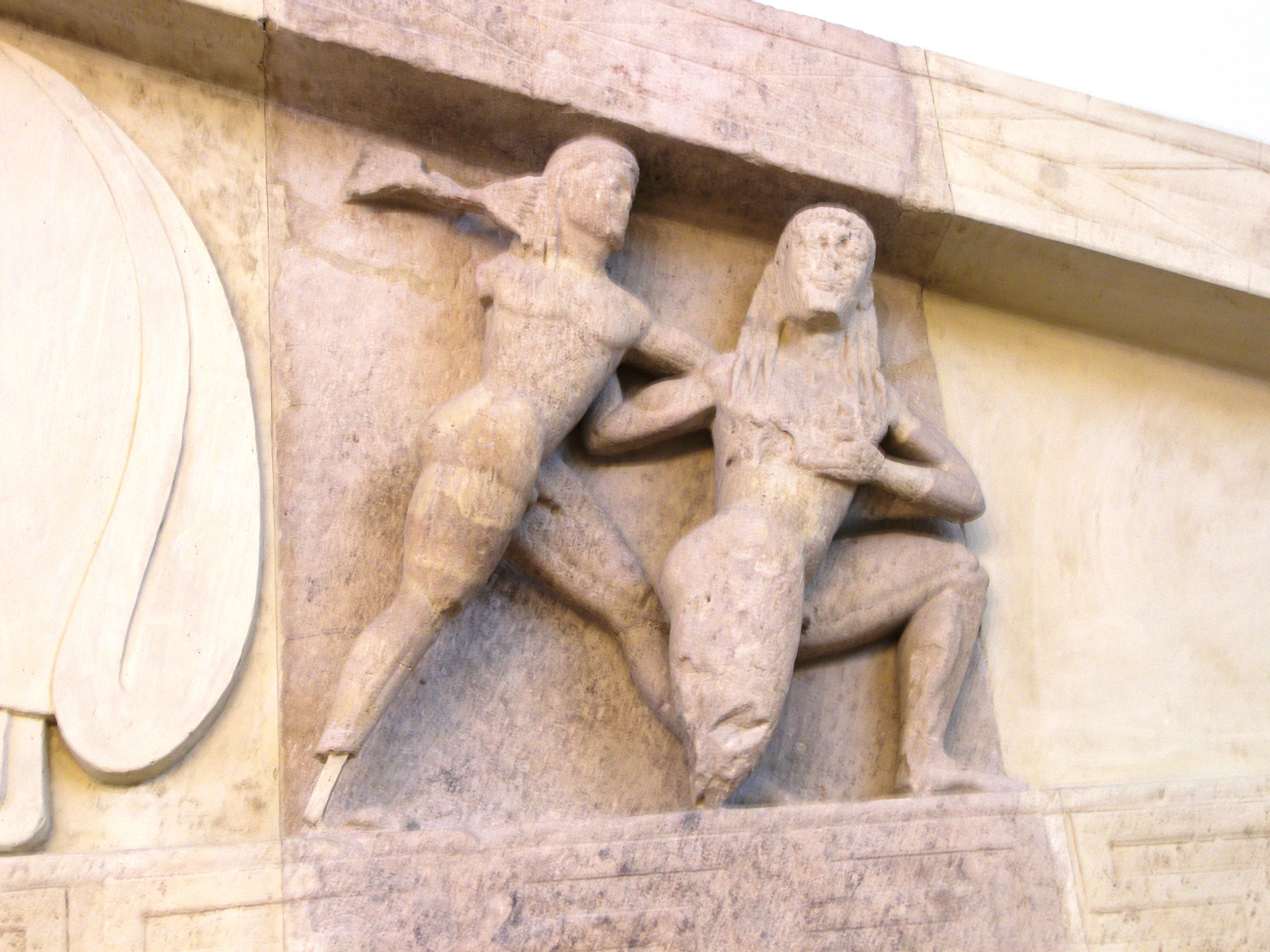
A possible depiction of the Titanomachy, in which a beardless Zeus launches a thunderbolt at a kneeling Titan or Giant at the Gorgon pediment of the Temple of Artemis in Corfu

The Titanomachy (Ancient Greek: Τιτανομαχία, romanized: Titanomakhía, lit. 'Titan-battle', Latin: Titanomachia) is a lost epic poem, which is a part of Greek mythology. It deals with the struggle that Zeus and his siblings, the Olympian Gods, had in overthrowing their father Cronus and his divine generation, the Titans.

The poem was traditionally ascribed to Eumelos of Corinth (8th century BC), a semi-legendary bard of the Bacchiad ruling family in archaic Corinth, who was venerated as the traditional composer of the Prosodion, the processional anthem of Messenian independence that was performed on Delos.

Even in antiquity many authors cited Titanomachia without an author's name. M. L. West argues that the epic was likely composed in the late 7th or early 6th century BC, much too late for Eumelos to have authored it. The attribution to Eumelos was likely pseudepigraphical and a reflection of his status as Corinth's generic eminent poet. From the sparse available evidence, it seems that Eumelos's account of the Titanomachy differed from the surviving account of Hesiod's Theogony at salient points.

The Titanomachy was divided into at least two books. The battle of Olympians and Titans was preceded by some sort of theogony, or genealogy of the primal gods, in which, the Byzantine writer Lydus remarked, the author of Titanomachy placed the birth of Zeus, not in Crete, but in Lydia, which should signify on Mount Sipylus.
