= List of Greek mythological creatures =

A host of legendary creatures, animals, and mythic humanoids occur in ancient Greek mythology. A mythological creature (also mythical or fictional entity) is a type of fictional entity, typically a hybrid, that has not been proven and that is described in folklore (including myths and legends), but may be featured in historical accounts before modernity. Something mythological can also be described as mythic, mythical, or mythologic.

== Mythological creatures ==
- Aeternae: Giants who use bones as tools. Their most notable feature is the saw-toothed protuberances sprouting from their heads.
- Amphisbaena: A serpent born from Medusa's blood over the Libyan Desert, famous for having two heads one on either end of its body. The Amphisbaena also has dragon wings and chicken feet.
- Arae: A female demon that personifies curses usually placed by the dead upon their murderers. They would leave the underworld to fulfill the curse.
- Basilisk: A serpent often called the king of snakes whose gaze could petrify or kill and its toxic breath could break stones.
- Catoblepas: A buffalo-like creature with shaggy fur, large horns, and a heavy head whose toxic breath and ugly looks could kill.
- Centaur and Centauride: Creatures with a head and the torso of a human, and the body of a horse.
  - Cyprian centaurs: bull-horned centaurs native to the island of Cyprus.
  - Ichthyocentaurs: a pair of marine centaurs with the upper bodies of men, the lower fronts of horses, and the tails of fish.
  - Lamian centaurs or Lamian Pheres: twelve rustic spirits of the Lamos river. They were instructed by Zeus to guard the infant Dionysus, protecting him from the machinations of Hera, but the enraged goddess transformed them into ox-horned centaurs. They accompanied Dionysus in his campaign against the Indians.
  - Onocentaur: part human, part donkey. It had the head and torso of a human with the body of a donkey.
- Cerastes: spineless serpents with a set of ram-like horns on their heads.
- Cerberus: a three headed dog, pet of Hades
- Cetus or Ceto: sea monsters.
- Ceuthonymus: daemon of the underworld. Father of Menoetius.
- Charybdis: a sea monster whose inhalations formed a deadly whirlpool or a huge water mouth.
- Chimera: a fire-breathing, three-headed monster with one head of a lion, one of a snake, and another of a goat, lion claws in front and goat legs behind, and a long snake tail.
- Crocotta or Cynolycus: a creature with the body of a stag, a lion's neck, cloven hooves, and a wide mouth with a sharp, bony ridge in place of teeth. It imitates the human voice, calls men by name at night, and devours those who approach it.
- Derceto: a half-woman half-fish goddess.
- Diomedes of Thrace: the son of Ares and Cyrene, known for his man-eating horses.
- Dryad: tree spirits who look similar to women.
- Echidna: Mate of Typhon and mother of many monsters.
- Eidolon: spirit-image of a living or dead person; a shade or phantom look-alike of the human form.
- Empousa, a ghostly female being who is able to shapeshift
- Eurynomos: the netherworld daemon of rotting corpses dwelling in the Underworld.
- Gello: a female demon or revenant who threatens the reproductive cycle by causing infertility, miscarriage, and infant mortality.
- Ghosts, Shades, Spirits.
- Gorgons: female monsters depicted with snakes on their head instead of hair, and sometimes described as having tusks, wings, and brazen claws. Their names were Euryale, Medusa, and Stheno.
- Graeae: three old women with one tooth and one eye among them. Also known as the Graeae sisters. Their names were Deino, Enyo, and Pemphredo.
- Griffin or Gryphon or Gryps or Grypes: a creature that combines a lion's body and an eagle's head and wings.
- Harpies: a creature with the torso, head, and arms of a woman, and the talons, tail, and wings (mixed with the arms) of a bird. Very small but can be vicious when provoked. Their names were Aello, Celaeno, and Ocypete.
- Hippalectryon: a creature with the fore parts of a horse and the hind parts of a cockerel/rooster.
- Hippocampus: a creature with the upper body of a horse and the lower body of a fish. Created by Poseidon when he offered them to Athens.
- Hydras
  - Lernaean Hydra: a many-headed, serpent-like creature that guarded an Underworld entrance beneath Lake Lerna. It was destroyed by Heracles, in his second Labour. Son of Typhon and Echidna.
- Ipotane: a race of half-horse, half-humans. The Ipotanes are considered the original version of the centaurs.
- Keres: the spirits of violent or cruel death.
- Kobaloi: a mischievous creature fond of tricking and frightening mortals.
- Lamia: a vampiric demon who by voluptuous artifices attracted young men, to enjoy their fresh, youthful, and pure flesh and blood.
  - Corinthian Lamia: a vampiric demon who seduced the handsome youth Menippos in the guise of a beautiful woman to consume his flesh and blood.
- Leontophonos (meaning "lion-killer"): a small animal whose urine was said to be fatal to lions.
- Leopanther: a mythical creature with the head of a lion and the body of a panther. Two leopanthers are depicted on the west pediment of the Temple of Artemis in Corfu.
- Manticore or Androphagos: having the body of a red lion, a human face with three rows of sharp teeth, and the wings of a bat or dragon. The manticore can shoot spikes out of its tail, making it a deadly foe.
- Merpeople: humans with fish tail after torso (Mermaid as female, Merman as male). They lure adventurers to drown them.
- Minotaur: a monster with the head of a bull and the body of a man; slain by Theseus in the Labyrinth created by Daedelus.
- Mormo, a vampiric creature that preyed on children.
- Multi-headed Dogs
  - Cerberus (Hellhound): the three-headed giant hound that guarded the gates of the Underworld.
  - Orthrus: a two-headed dog, brother of Cerberus, slain by Heracles.
- Nymph
- Odontotyrannos: a beast with a black, horse-like head, with three horns protruding from its forehead, and exceeded the size of an elephant.
- Ophiotaurus (Bull-Serpent): a creature part bull and part serpent.
- Ouroboros: an immortal self-eating, circular being. The being is a serpent or a dragon curled into a circle or hoop, biting its tail.
- Panes: a tribe of nature spirits that had the heads and torsos of men, the legs and tails of goats, goatish faces, and goat-horns.
- Panther: a big cat with a multicoloured hide, similar to a Leopard.
- Philinnion: an unwed maiden who died prematurely and returned from the tomb as the living dead to consort with a handsome youth named Makhates. When her mother discovered the girl she collapsed back into death and was burned by the terrified townsfolk beyond the town boundaries.
- Phoenix: a golden-red firebird of which only one could live at a time, but would burst into flames to rebirth from ashes as a new phoenix.
- Satyrs and Satyresses: creatures with upper human bodies, and the horns and hindquarters of a goat. Some were companions of Pan and Dionysus.
- Scylla: once a nereid, transformed by Circe into a many-headed, tentacled monster who fed on passing sailors in the straits between herself and Charybdis by plucking them off the ship and eating them.
- Scythian Dracanae: upper body of a woman, lower body composed of two snake tails.
- Sea goats: creatures having the back end of a fish and the front parts of a goat.
- Sirens: bird-like women whose irresistible song lured sailors to their deaths.
- Skolopendra: a giant sea monster said to be the size of a Greek trireme. It has a crayfish-like tail, numerous legs along its body which it uses like oars to move, and extremely long hairs that protrude from its nostrils. Child of Phorcys and Keto.
- Spartae: a malevolent spirit born from violence. Argo crew member Jason fought alongside these creatures after discovering the dragon teeth could create these violent spirits. Spartae is generally depicted as skeletal beings with some form of weapon and military attire.
- Sphinx
  - Androsphinx or simply Sphinx: a creature with the head of a human and the body of a lion.
  - Criosphinx: a creature with the head of a ram and the body of a lion.
  - Hieracosphinx: a creature with the head of a hawk and the body of a lion.
- Stymphalian birds: man-eating birds with beaks of bronze and sharp metallic feathers they could launch at their victims.
- Tarandos: a rare animal with the size of an ox and the head of a deer. It could change the color of its hair according to the environment that it was, like a chameleon. It was living at the land of the Scythians. Solinus, wrote about a similar creature in Aethiopia and called it Parandrus.
- Taraxippi: ghosts that frightened horses.
- Triton: son of Poseidon and Amphitrite, half-man and half-fish.
- Typhon or Typhoeus: a humongous savage monster with snake coils instead of limbs; father of several other monsters with his mate Echidna. Almost destroyed the gods but was foiled by Hermes and Zeus.
- Unicorns or Monocerata: creatures as large or larger than horses with a large, pointed, spiraling horn projecting from their forehead.
- Vrykolakas: shares similarities with numerous other legendary creatures, but is generally equated with the vampire of the folklore of the neighbouring Slavic countries. While the two are very similar, a vrykolakas eats flesh, particularly livers, rather than drinking blood, which combined with other factors such as its appearance bring it more in line with the modern concept of a zombie or ghoul.
- Werewolf or Lycanthrope.
  - Agriopas: he tasted the viscera of a human child and was turned into a wolf for ten years.
  - Damarchus: a boxer from Parrhasia (Arcadia) who is said to have changed his shape into that of a wolf at the festival of Lykaia, became a man again after ten years.
  - Lycaon: turned into a wolf by the gods as punishment for serving them his murdered son Nyctimus' flesh at a feast.
  - Lykos (Λύκος) of Athens: a wolf-shaped herο whose shrine stood by the jury court, and the first jurors were named after him.
- Winged Horses, or Pterippi.
  - Pegasus: a divine winged stallion that is pure white, son of Medusa and Poseidon, brother of Chrysaor, and father of winged horses.
  - Ethiopian Pegasus: winged, horned horses native to Ethiopia.

== Giants ==
=== Gigantes ===
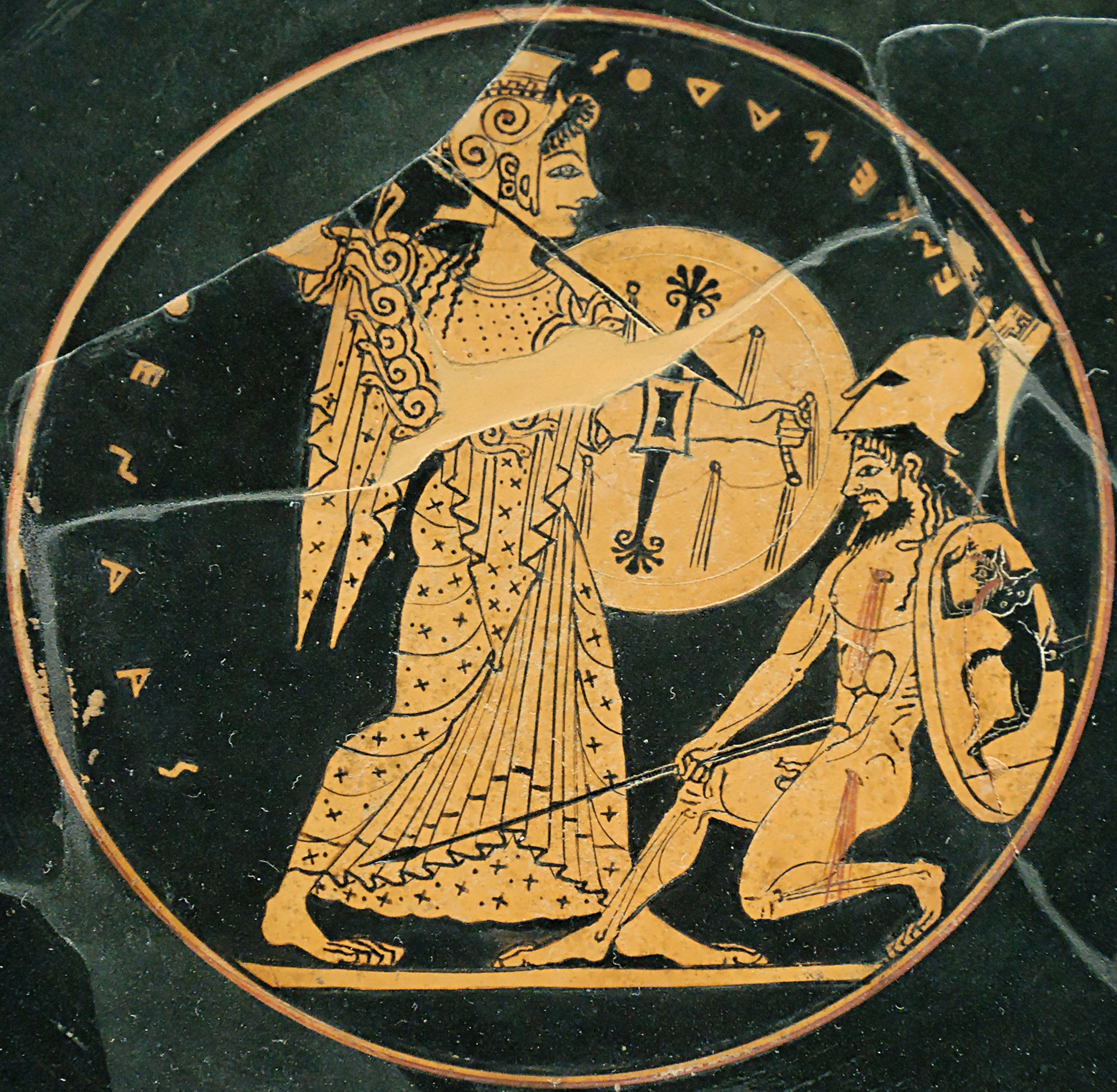
Athena (left) fighting Enceladus (inscribed retrograde) on an Attic red-figure dish, c. 550–500 BC (Louvre CA3662).

The Gigantes were a race of great strength and aggression. They were the offspring of Gaia (Earth), born from the blood that fell when Uranus (Sky) was castrated by their Titan son Cronus, who fought the Gigantomachy, their war with the Olympian gods for supremacy of the cosmos. Archaic and Classical representations show Gigantes as human in form, while later representations show Gigantes with snakes for legs.

=== Other giants ===
- Almops a giant son of the god Poseidon and the half-nymph Helle.
- Aloadae (Ἀλῳάδαι), twin giants who attempted to climb to Olympus by piling mountains on top of each other. Their names were Otus and Ephialtes.
- Anax (Αναξ) was a giant of the island of Lade near Miletos in Lydia, Anatolia.
- Antaeus (Ἀνταῖος), a Libyan giant who wrestled all visitors to the death until he was slain by Heracles.
- Antiphates (Ἀντιφάτης), the king of the man-eating giants known as Laestrygones which were encountered by Odysseus on his travels.
- Argus Panoptes (Ἄργος Πανόπτης), a hundred-eyed giant tasked with guarding Io.
- Athos: an enemy of Poseidon, best known for the creation of Mount Athos in Chalcidice.
- Cacus (Κακος), a fire-breathing Latin giant slain by Heracles.
- Chthonius
- Cyclopes: three one-eyed giants who forged the lightning bolts of Zeus and Helmet and Bident of Hades. Some assisted the god Hephaestus at his workshops. Children of Gaia and Uranus, who were locked by Uranus in Tartarus. According to Hesiod, their names were Arges, Brontes, and Steropes. According to Homer, were a tribe of one-eyed, man-eating giants who herded flocks of sheep on the island of Sicily, who included Polyphemus.
- Echion: known for great strength (though not necessarily great size) and having an ability to change the course or direction of winds.
- The Gegenees (Γηγενέες), a tribe of six-armed giants fought by the Argonauts on Bear Mountain in Mysia.
- Geryon (Γηρυων): according to Hesiod, Geryon was a giant with one body and three heads, whereas the tradition followed by Aeschylus gave him three bodies. A lost description by Stesichorus said that he has six hands and six feet and is winged; there are some mid-sixth-century Chalcidian vases portraying Geryon as winged. Some accounts state that he had six legs as well, while others state that the three bodies were joined to one pair of legs.
- The Hekatoncheires (Ἑκατόγχειρες), or Centimanes (Latin), the Hundred-Handed Ones, giant gods of violent storms and hurricanes. Three sons of Uranus and Gaia, each with his own distinct characters. Their names were Briareus (or Aigaion), Cottus, and Gyges.
- The Laestrygonians (Λαιστρυγόνες), a tribe of man-eating giants encountered by Odysseus on his travels.
  - Antiphates: King of the Laestrygonians.
- Lion-Headed Giants
  - Leon or Lion: killed by Herakles in the war against the gods.
- Orion (Ὠρίων), a giant huntsman whom Zeus placed among the stars as the constellation of Orion.
- Periboea: a Giantess, daughter of the king of the giants.
- Talos (Τάλως), a giant forged from bronze by Hephaestus, and given by Zeus to his lover Europa as her personal protector.
- Tityos (Τίτυος), a giant slain by Apollo and Artemis when he attempted to violate their mother Leto.
- Typhon (Τυφῶν), a monstrous immortal storm-giant who attempted to launch an attack on Mount Olympus but was defeated by the Olympians and imprisoned in the pits of Tartarus.

== Animals ==
- Birds
  - Acanthis (Carduelis)
  - Alectryon (Rooster). Alectryon was a youth, charged by Ares to stand guard outside his door while the god indulged in illicit love with Aphrodite. He fell asleep, and Helios, the sun god, walked in on the couple. Ares turned Alectryon into a rooster, which never forgets to announce the arrival of the sun in the morning.
  - Autonous (Stone-curlew)
  - Birds of Ares or Ornithes Areioi were a flock of birds that guarded the Amazons' shrine of the god on a coastal island in the Black Sea. The Argonauts encountered them in their quest for the Golden Fleece.
  - Cranes
    - Gerana, a queen of the Pygmy who was transformed by the goddess Hera into a crane.
    - Oenoe.
  - Diomedes Birds, the Diomedes companions were transformed into seabirds
  - Eagles
    - Aethon or Caucasian Eagle, a giant eagle, offspring of Typhon and Echidna. Zeus condemned Prometheus to having his liver eaten by the Caucasian Eagle for giving the Flames of Olympus to the mortals.
    - Aetos Dios, giant golden eagle of Zeus.
  - Hippodamia (Lark)
  - Kingfisher
    - Alcyone transformed by gods into halcyon birds, the Halcyon genus and Halcyonidae birds took the name from Alcyone.
    - Alkyonides, the seven daughters of Alcyoneus. When their father was slain by Heracles, they threw themselves into the sea, and were transformed into halcyons by Amphitrite.
    - Ceyx transformed by gods into halcyon birds, the Ceyx birds took their name from Ceyx.
  - Nightingale
    - Aëdon
    - Procne
  - Owls
    - Little Owl, bird of goddess Athena.
    - Nyctimene
    - Screech Owl (Ascalaphus), bird of god Hades.
  - Philomela (Swallow)
  - Ravens/Crows
    - Corone, a woman transformed into a crow by Athena.
    - Corvus, a crow or raven which served Apollo. Apollo was about to make a sacrifice on the altar and he needs some water to perform the ritual. The god sends the raven to fetch some water in his cup, but the bird gets distracted by a fig tree and spends a few days lazily resting and waiting for the figs to ripen. After feasting on the figs, the raven finally brings Apollo the cup filled with water and he also brings a water snake (Hydra) as an excuse for being so late. Apollo sees through the raven's lies and angrily casts all three – the cup (Crater, Crater (constellation)), the water snake (Hydra, Hydra (constellation)), and the raven (Corvus, Corvus (constellation)) into the sky. Apollo also casts a curse on the raven, scorching its feathers and making the bird eternally thirsty and unable to do anything about it. According to the myth, this is how crows and ravens came to have black feathers and why they have such raspy voices.
    - Lycius, a man transformed by Apollo into a raven.
  - Swans
    - Cycnus (Swan), Cycnus, was a good friend of Phaethon, when Phaethon died, he sat by the river Eridanos mourning his death. The gods turned him into a swan to relieve him of his pity.
    - Swans of Apollo, the swans drawing the chariot of Apollo.
  - Strix, birds of ill omen, a product of metamorphosis, that fed on human flesh and blood.
  - Tereus (Hoopoe)
- Boars
  - Calydonian Boar, a gigantic boar sent by Artemis to ravage Calydon. Was slain in the Calydonian Boar Hunt.
  - Clazomenae Boar, gigantic winged sow which terrorized the Greek town of Klazomenai in Ionia, Asia Minor.
  - Crommyonian Sow, the Crommyonian Sow was a wild pig that ravaged the region around the village of Crommyon between Megara and Corinth and was eventually slain by Theseus in his early adventures.
  - Erymanthian Boar, a gigantic boar that Heracles was sent to retrieve as one of his labors.
- Bugs
  - Gadflies, mythical insects sent by the gods to sting wicked mortals for their cruel acts.
  - Myrmekes, large ants that can range in size from small dogs to giant bears which guarded a hill that had rich deposits of gold.
  - Myrmidons, ants which transformed into humans.
- Cattle
  - The Cattle of Geryon, magnificent cattle guarded by Orthrus.
  - The Cattle of Helios, immortal cattle of oxen and sheep owned by the sun titan Helios.
  - The black-skinned cattle of Hades, the cattle owned by Hades and guarded by Menoetes.
- Cercopes, monkeys.
- Cretan Bull/Marathonian Bull, was the bull Pasiphaë fell in love with, giving birth to the Minotaur.
- Deer
  - Actaeon, Artemis turned him into a deer for spying on her while bathing. He was promptly eaten by his own hunting dogs.
  - Ceryneian Hind, an enormous deer which was sacred to Artemis; Heracles was sent to retrieve it as one of his labours
  - Elaphoi Khrysokeroi, four immortal golden-horned deer sacred to the goddess Artemis.
- Dionysus' Panthers, the panthers that draw the chariot of Dionysus.
- Dogs/Hounds
  - Actaeon's dogs
  - Argos, Odysseus' faithful dog, known for his speed, strength and his superior tracking skills.
  - Golden Dog, a dog that guarded the infant god Zeus.
  - Guard Dogs of Hephaestus Temple, a pack of sacred dogs that guarded the temple of Hephaestus at Mount Etna.
  - Laelaps, a female dog destined always to catch her prey.
  - Maera, the hound of Erigone, daughter of Icarius of Athens.
  - Artemis's pack of 14 exquisite hunting dogs, given to her as a child by Pan.
  - The golden dog that guarded Zeus and his she-goat nurse during his infancy in Crete and was later stolen by Pandareus.
- Dolphins
  - Delphin, a dolphin who found Amphitrite, when Poseidon was looking for her. For his service, Poseidon placed him in the sky as the constellation Delphinus.
  - Dolphin that saved Arion.
  - Dolphins of Taras. A dolphin saved Taras, who is often depicted mounted on a dolphin.
- Donkeys
  - Donkey of Hephaestus, Hephaestus was often shown riding a donkey.
  - Donkey of Silenus, Silenus rode a donkey.
  - Scythian horned donkeys, in Scythia there were donkeys with horns, and these horns were holding water from the river Styx.
- Goats
  - Amalthea, golden-haired female goat, foster-mother of Zeus.
- Horses
  - Anemoi, the gods of the four directional winds in horse-shape drawing the chariot of Zeus.
    - Boreas
    - Eurus
    - Notos
    - Zephyrus or Zephyr
  - Arion, the immortal horse of Adrastus, which could run at fantastic speeds. Was said to eat gold.
  - Horses of Achilles, immortal horses.
    - Balius
    - Xanthus
  - Horses of Ares, immortal fire-breathing horses of the god Ares.
    - Aethon
    - Konabos
    - Phlogeous
    - Phobos
  - Horses of Autonous,
  - Horses of Eos, a pair of immortal horses owned by the dawn-goddess, Eos.
    - Lampus
    - Phaethon
  - Horses of Erechtheus, a pair of immortal horses owned by the king of Athens, Erechtheus.
    - Podarkes
    - Xanthos
  - Horses of Dioskouroi, the immortal horses of the Dioskouroi.
    - Harpagos
    - Kyllaros
    - Phlogeus
    - Xanthos
  - Horses of Hector
    - Aethon
    - Lampus
    - Podargus
    - Xanthus
  - Horses of Helios, immortal horses of the sun-god Helios.
    - Abraxas
    - Aethon
    - Bronte
    - Euos
    - Phlegon
    - Pyrois
    - Sterope
    - Therbeeo
  - Horses of Poseidon, immortal horses of the god Poseidon.
  - Mares of Diomedes, four man-eating horses belonging to the giant Diomedes.
    - Dinus
    - Lampus
    - Podargus
    - Xanthus
  - Ocyrhoe, daughter of Chiron and Chariclo. She was transformed into a horse.
  - Trojan Horses or Trojan Hippoi, twelve immortal horses owned by the Trojan king Laomedon.
- Karkinos or Carcinus, a giant crab that fought Heracles alongside the Lernaean Hydra.
- Leopards
  - Ampelus, Claudius Aelianus in the "Characteristics of Animals" writes that there is a leopard called the Ampelus, it is not like the other leopards and has no tail. If it is seen by women it afflicts them with an unexpected ailment.
  - Dionysus' Leopard: Dionysus is often shown riding a leopard.
- Lions
  - Nemean Lion, a gigantic lion whose skin was impervious to weapons; was strangled by Heracles.
  - Lion of Cithaeron, a lion that was killed by Heracles or by Alcathous.
  - Rhea's Lions, the lions drawing the chariot of Rhea.
- Snakes
  - Gigantic snakes of Libya, according to Diodorus, Amazons used the skins of large snakes for protective devices, since Libya had such animals of incredible size.
  - Snakes of Hera, Hera sent two big snakes to kill Herakles when he was an infant.
  - Water-snake, god Apollo was about to make a sacrifice on the altar and he needs some water to perform the ritual. The god sends the raven to fetch some water in his cup, but the bird gets distracted by a fig tree and spends a few days lazily resting and waiting for the figs to ripen. After feasting on the figs, the raven finally brings Apollo the cup filled with water and he also brings a water snake (Hydra) as an excuse for being so late. Apollo sees through the raven's lies and angrily casts all three – the cup (Crater, Crater (constellation)), the water snake (Hydra, Hydra (constellation)), and the raven (Corvus, Corvus (constellation)) into the sky.
- Teumessian fox, a gigantic fox destined never to be hunted down.
- Tortoises/Turtles
  - Giant turtle: Sciron robbed travelers passing the Sceironian Rocks and forced them to wash his feet. When they knelt before him, he kicked them over the cliff into the sea, where they were eaten by the giant sea turtle. Theseus killed him in the same way.
  - Tortoise from which Hermes created his tortoiseshell lyre, when Hermes was a mere babe, found a tortoise, which he killed, and, stretching seven strings across the empty shell, invented a lyre.
  - Zeus and the Tortoise
- Libyan beast (Λιβυκὸν θηρίον), was a term which referred to a kind of degenerate creature. It is said that while Libya is home to many animals, it is dry and lacks water. When various animals gather at a single water source, they intermingle and mate with each other, resulting in offspring that are deformed or hybrid creatures.
- Libyan bird (Λιβυκὸν ὄρνεον), was a term used for ostrich, but sometimes it was used to describe a big bird (according to Suda because in Libya there were many unusual birds).

== Dragons ==
The dragons of Greek mythology were serpentine monsters. They include the serpent-like Drakons, the marine-dwelling Cetea, and the she-monster Dracaenae. Homer describes the dragons with wings and legs.

- The Colchian Dragon, an unsleeping dragon that guarded the Golden Fleece.
- Cychreides, a dragon that terrorized Salamis before being slain, tamed, or driven out by Cychreus.
- Delphyne, female dragon.
- Demeter's dragons, a pair of winged dragons that drew Demeter's chariot and, after having been given as a gift, that of Triptolemus.
- Giantomachian dragon, a dragon that was thrown at Athena during the Giant war. She threw it into the sky where it became the constellation Draco.
- The Ismenian Dragon, a dragon which guarded the sacred spring of Ares near Thebes; it was slain by Cadmus.
- Ladon, a serpent-like dragon that guarded the golden apples of the immortality of the Hesperides.
- Lernaean Hydra, also known as King Hydra, is a many-headed, serpent-like creature that guarded an Underworld entrance beneath Lake Lerna. It was destroyed by Heracles, in his second Labour. Son of Typhon and Echidna.
- Maeonian Drakon, a dragon that lived in the kingdom of Lydia and was killed by Damasen.
- Medea's dragons, a pair of flying dragons that pulled Medea's chariot. Born from the blood of the Titans.
- Nemean dragon, a dragon that guarded Zeus' sacred grove in Nemea.
- Ophiogenean dragon, a dragon that guarded Artemis' sacred grove in Mysia.
- Pitanian dragon, a dragon in Pitane, Aeolis, that was turned to stone by the gods.
- Pyrausta, a four-legged insect with filmy wings and a dragon's head.
- Python, a dragon that guarded the oracle of Delphi; it was slain by Apollo.
- Rhodian dragons, serpents that inhabited the island of Rhodes; they were killed by Phorbus.
- Thespian dragon, a dragon that terrorized the city of Thespiae in Boeotia.
- Trojan dragons, a pair of dragons or giant serpents from Tenedos sent by various gods to kill Laocoön and his sons in order to stop him from telling his people that the Wooden Horse was a trap.

=== Drakons ===
Drakons ("δράκους" in Greek, "dracones" in Latin) were giant serpents, sometimes possessing multiple heads or able to breathe fire (or even both), but most just spit deadly poison. They are usually depicted without wings.

- The Ethiopian Dragon was a breed of giant serpent native to the lands of Ethiopia. They killed elephants and rivaled the longest-lived animals. They are mentioned in the work of Aelian, On The Characteristics Of Animals (Greek: Περί ζώων ιδιότητος)
- The Indian Dragon was a breed of the giant serpent which could fight and strangle the elephants of India.

=== Cetea ===
Cetea were sea monsters. They were usually featured in myths of a hero rescuing a sacrificial princess.

- The Ethiopian Cetus was a sea monster sent by Poseidon to ravage Ethiopia and devour Andromeda. It was slain by Perseus.
- The Trojan Cetus was a sea monster that plagued Troy before being slain by Heracles.
- Cetea at Taprobana were sea monsters at Taprobana (modern Sri Lanka).

=== Dracaenae ===
The Dracaenae were monsters that had the upper body of a beautiful woman and the lower body of any sort of dragon. Echidna, the mother of monsters, and Ceto, the mother of sea monsters, are two famous dracaenae. Some Dracaenae were even known to have had in place two legs, and one (or two) serpent tails.

- Ceto (or Keto), a marine goddess who was the mother of all sea monsters as well as Echidna and other dragons and monsters.
- Echidna, wife of Typhon and mother of monsters.
- Kampê, a dracaena that was charged by Cronus with the job of guarding the gates of Tartarus; she was slain by Zeus when he rescued the Cyclopes and Hecatoncheires from their prison.
- Poena, a dracaena sent by Apollo to ravage the kingdom of Argos as punishment for the death of his infant son Linos; killed by Coraebus.
- Scylla, a dracaena that was the lover of Poseidon, transformed by Circe into a multi-headed monster that fed on sailors on vessels passing between her and Charybdis.
- Scythian Dracaena, the Dracaena queen of Scythia; she stole Geryon's cattle that Heracles was herding through the region and agreed to return them on condition he mate with her.
- Sybaris, a dracaena that lived on a mountain near Delphi, eating shepherds and passing travelers; she was pushed off the cliff by Eurybarus.

== Automatons ==
Automatons, or Colossi, were men/women, animals and monsters crafted out of metal and made animate in order to perform various tasks. They were created by the divine smith, Hephaestus. The Athenian inventor Daedalus also manufactured automatons.

- The Hippoi Kabeirikoi, four bronze horse-shaped automatons crafted by Hephaestus to draw the chariot of the Cabeiri.
- The Keledones (Χρυσεαι Κηληδονες, lit. "Golden Charmers"), singing maidens sculpted out of gold by Hephaestus.
- The Khalkotauroi also known as the Colchis Bulls, fire-breathing bulls created by Hephaestus as a gift for Aeëtes.
- In the Iliad, mechanical golden handmaidens are created by the god Hephaestus.
- Talos, a giant man made out of bronze to protect Europa.

== Mythic humanoids ==
- Acephali/Headless men (Greek ἀκέφαλος akephalos, plural ἀκέφαλοι akephaloi, from ἀ- a-, "without", and κεφαλή kephalé, "head") are humans without a head, with their mouths and eyes being in their breasts.
- Anthropophage, mythical race of cannibals.
- Arimaspi, a tribe of one-eyed men.
- Astomi, race of people who had no need to eat or drink anything at all.
- Atlantians, people of Atlantis.
- Bebryces, a tribe of people who lived in Bithynia
- Curetes, legendary people who took part in the quarrel over the Calydonian Boar.
- Cynocephaly, dog-headed people.
- Dactyls, mythical race of small phallic male beings.
  - Acmon
- Gargareans, were an all-male tribe.
- Halizones, people that appear in Homer's Iliad as allies of Troy during the Trojan War.
- Hemicynes, half-dog people.
- Hyperboreans, mythical people who lived "beyond the North Wind".
- Lotus-eaters, people living on an island dominated by lotus plants. The lotus fruits and flowers were the primary food of the island and were narcotic, causing the people to sleep in peaceful apathy.
- Machlyes, hermaphrodites whose bodies were male on one side and female on the other.
- Monopodes or Skiapodes, a tribe of one-legged Libyan men who used their gigantic foot as shade against the midday sun.
- Panotii, a tribe of northern men with gigantic, body-length ears.
- Pygmies, a tribe of one and a half foot tall African men who rode goats into battle against migrating cranes.
  - Gerana
  - Oenoe
- Spartoi, mythical warriors who sprang up from the dragon's teeth.
- Troglodytae

== See also ==
- Lists of legendary creatures
- List of legendary creatures by type
- List of Greek deities
- List of mortals in Greek mythology

== Sources ==
- Burkert, Walter (1982). Structure and History in Greek Mythology and Ritual. University of California Press. ISBN 978-0-520-04770-9.
- Morford, Mark; Robert Lenardon (2003). Classical Mythology (7 ed.). New York: Oxford University Press.
