= List of legendary creatures (P) =

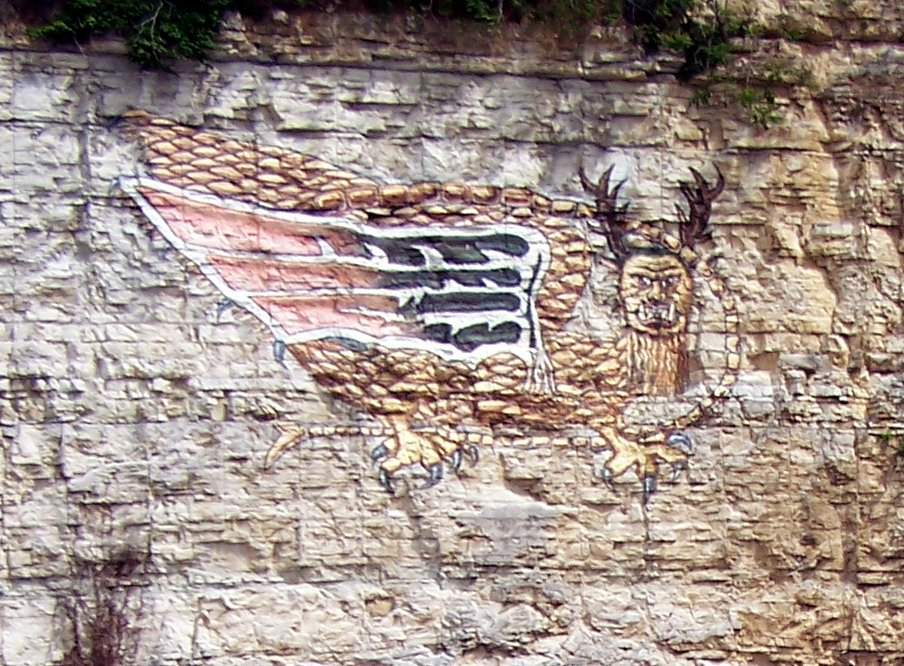
A modern painting of the "Piasa Bird", on the bluffs of the Mississippi River in Alton, Illinois. Wings were not present in the original painting.

1. Paasselkä devils (Finnish) – Spectral fire
2. Pakhangba (Meitei mythology and Sanamahism) – Serpentine dragon, ruler of the universe
3. Pamola (Abenaki) – Weather spirit
4. Panes (Greek) – Human-goat hybrids descended from the god Pan
5. Pandi (Medieval Bestiary) – White-haired humanoid with giant ears and eight fingers and toes
6. Panis (Hindu) – Demons with herds of stolen cows
7. Panlong (Chinese) – Water dragon
8. Panotti (Medieval Bestiaries) – Humanoid with gigantic ears
9. Panther (Medieval Bestiaries) – Feline with sweet breath
10. Parandrus (Medieval Bestiaries) – Shapeshifting animal whose natural form was a large ruminant
11. Pard (Medieval Bestiaries) – Fast, spotted feline believed to mate with lions to produce leopards
12. Pardalokampoi (Etruscan) – Fish-tailed leopard
13. Patagon (Medieval folklore) – Giant race reputed to live in the area of Patagonia
14. Patasola (Latin America) – Anthropophagous, one-legged humanoid
15. Patupairehe (Māori) – White-skinned nature spirits
16. Pech (Scottish) – Strong little people
17. Pegaeae (Greek) – Spring nymph
18. Pegasus (Greek) – Winged horse
19. Pegacorn – Pegasus-unicorn hybrid
20. Pelesit (Malay) – Servant spirit
21. Peluda (French) – Dragon
22. Penanggalan (Malay) – Vampires that sever their heads from their bodies to fly around, usually with their intestines or other internal organs trailing behind
23. Peng (Chinese) – Giant bird
24. Penghou (Chinese) – Tree spirit
25. Perchta
26. Peri (Persian) – Winged humanoid
27. Peryton (Allegedly Medieval folklore) – Deer-bird hybrid
28. Pesanta (Catalan) – Nightmare demon in the form of a cat or dog
29. Peuchen (Chilota and Mapuche) – Vampiric, flying, shapeshifting serpent
30. Phi Tai Hong (Thai) – Ghost of a person who has died suddenly of a violent or cruel death
31. Phoenix (Phoenician) – Regenerative bird reborn from its own ashes
32. Piasa (Native American mythology) – Winged, antlered feline-like dragon
33. Piatek (Armenian) – Large land animal
34. Pictish Beast (Pictish stones) – Stylistic animal, possibly a dragon
35. Pillan (Mapuche) – Nature spirit
36. Pim-skwa-wagen-owad (Abenaki) – Water spirit
37. Piru (Finnish) – Minor demon
38. Pishacha (Hindu) – Carrion-eating demon
39. Pishtaco (Peru) – Monster man that steals its victim's body fat for cannibalistic purposes
40. Pita-skog (Abenaki) – Serpentine rain spirit
41. Pixie (Cornish) – Little people and nature spirits
42. Pixiu (Chinese) – Winged lion
43. Pi yao (Chinese) – Horned, dragon-lion hybrid
44. Plague Maiden
45. Plakavac (Slavic) – Vampire created when a mother strangles her child
46. Pok-wejee-men (Abenaki) – Tree spirit
47. Polevik (Polish) – Little people and field spirits
48. Pollo Maligno (Colombian) – Man-eating chicken spirit
49. Polong (Malay) – Invisible servant spirit
50. Poltergeist (German) – Ghost that moves objects
51. Pombero (Guaraní) – Wild man and nature spirit
52. Ponaturi (Māori) – Grotesque, malevolent humanoid
53. Pontianak (Malay) – Undead, vampiric women who died in childbirth
54. Pop (Thai) – Cannibalistic spirit
55. Pope Lick Monster (American Folklore) Kentucky Urban Legend – Cryptid, a murderous creature that is part man, sheep, and goat
56. Popobawa (Africa) – One-eyed creatures bat-like
57. Poubi Lai (Meitei mythology) – Evil dragon python from the Loktak lake
58. Pouākai (Māori) – Giant bird
59. Poroniec
60. Povitrulya
61. Pražnec (Bohemia) – Malevolent field spirit
62. Preta (Buddhist, Hindu, and Jain) – Ghosts of especially greedy people
63. Pricolici (Romanian – Roman) – Undead wolf
64. Psoglav (Serbia) – Dog-headed monster
65. Psotnik (Slavic) – Mischievous spirit
66. Psychai (Greek) – Butterfly-winged nymphs, daughters of Psyche
67. Psychic vampire
68. Psychopomp (Greek) – Creatures, spirits, angels, or deities in many religions who escort newly deceased souls from Earth to the afterlife
69. Púca (Welsh) – Shapeshifting animal spirit
70. Púki (Icelandic) – Malevolent little person
71. Puck (English) – House spirit
72. Putz (German) – House spirit
73. Pugot (Philippine) – Headless humanoid
74. Puk (Frisian) – House spirit
75. Pūķis (Latvian) – Dragon
76. Puckwudgie (Native American mythology) – Troll-like gray-skinned being
77. Pygmy (Greek) – Little people
78. Pyrausta (Greek) – Insect-dragon hybrid
79. Python (Greek) – Serpentine dragon
