= Hilleviones =

Germanic People in Scandinavia

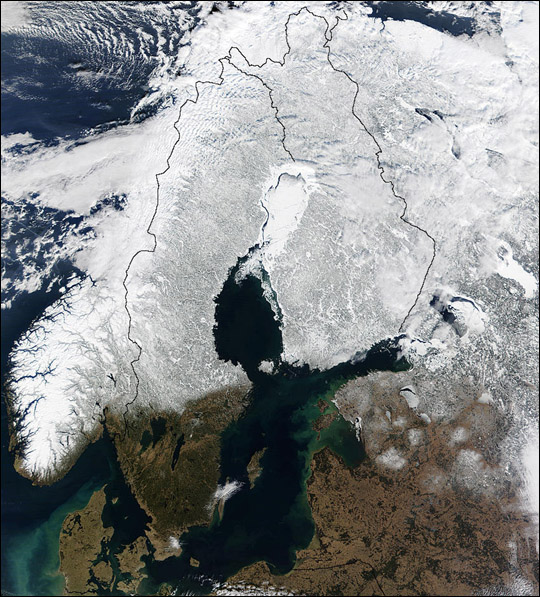
Scandinavia, satellite picture from March 2002

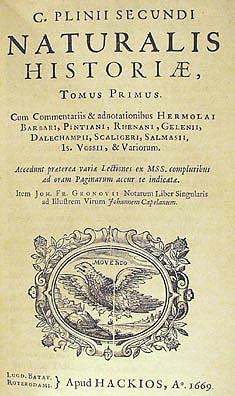
Front page of a 1669 edition of Pliny's Naturalis Historia.

The Hilleviones were a Germanic people occupying an island called Scatinavia in the 1st century AD, according to the Roman geographer Pliny the Elder in Naturalis Historia (Book 4, Chapter 13 resp. 27), written circa 77 AD. Pliny's Scatinavia is generally believed to have referred to the Scandinavian Peninsula, which in the 1st century AD had not yet been fully explored by the Romans and was therefore described as an island. Pliny wrote that it was an island "of a magnitude as yet unascertained". The Hilleviones lived in the only part of the island that was known, and according to Pliny, they thought of their 500 villages as a separate (alterum) world.

== Pliny's description ==
Along the route to Scatinavia, as described by Pliny, were unexplored islands (named Oeonae by Pliny) with people who were rumoured to have "ears of such extraordinary size as to cover the rest of the body, which is otherwise left naked" (see Panotii). On neighboring islands, "human beings are produced with the feet of horses" (see Hippopodes), Pliny wrote. Leaving these unfamiliar lands behind, a traveller will enter the nation of the Ingaevones in Germania, where, according to Pliny, "we begin to have some information upon which more implicit reliance can be placed". In this more familiar territory is a mountain range called Saevo, which stretches all the way to a large promontory called "of the Cimbri" (Cimbrorum), which ends in a gulf called Codanus. It is here, in this gulf, that the island of Scatinavia can be found.

The section that mentions the Hilleviones is short:

"Incipit deinde clarior aperiri fama ab gente Inguaeonum, quae est prima in Germania. mons Saevo ibi, inmensus nec Ripaeis iugis minor, inmanem ad Cimbrorum usque promunturium efficit sinum, qui Codanus vocatur, refertus insulis, quarum clarissima est Scatinavia, inconpertae magnitudinis, portionem tantum eius, quod notum sit, Hillevionum gente quingentis incolente pagis: quare alterum orbem terrarum eam appellant. nec minor est opinione Aeningia."

(Leaving these however, we come to the nation of the Ingævones, the first in Germany .... In their country is an immense mountain called Sevo, not less than those of the Riphæan range, and which forms an immense gulf along the shore as far as the Promontory of the Cimbri. This gulf, which has the name of the 'Codanian,' is filled with islands; the most famous among which is Scandinavia, of a magnitude as yet unascertained: the only portion of it at all known is inhabited by the nation of the Hilleviones, who dwell in 500 villages, and call it a second world: it is generally supposed that the island of Eningia is of not less magnitude.)

In another chapter of Naturalis Historia, Pliny mentions an island called Tyle (Book 4, Chapter 104)

== Scandinavian tribes in other sources ==
All the classical geographers who wrote about this region during the first six centuries AD name different tribes as the inhabitants of the main Scandinavian "island". Shortly before Pliny, Pomponius Mela wrote about Codannovia (also assumed to be Scandinavia) where a tribe called the Teutoni could be found. In Tacitus's Germania from around 98 AD, tribes called the Sitones and the Suiones are mentioned as inhabitants in neighboring lands. The Suiones are described as living "in the sea", which has generally been interpreted as meaning "living on an island". The area described by Tacitus has therefore sometimes been treated as being the equivalent of Pliny's island Scatinavia, although variants on Scandiae and Scandinavia are not names used by Tacitus for this region.

In the 2nd century AD, Ptolemy mentions four islands of Skandiai in his Geographia. On the largest island, Skandia, can be found seven different tribes, including the Geats (Goutai) and the Daukiones, but none of the other five tribes mentioned by Ptolemy occur in the writings of the two earlier geographers as inhabitants of the island.

Some 20th-century scholars, including the American etymologist Kemp Malone (1889–1971), have argued that the reason for the differences between Pliny, Tacitus and Ptolemy when it comes to names and tribes is that their informants came from different regions, mainly familiar with the parts of Scandinavia closest to their own location: "The name Scadinavia (with its variant forms) reached the classical world through western sources, and ... Tacitus, whose information about the North came from the east, knows nothing of the name, in contradistinction to Pliny, who got his information from the west." Malone goes on to argue that Ptolemy also based his account about the island Skandia and its Scandinavian tribes on western sources, and that this is the reason that Ptolemy does not have any Suiones or "Swedes" among the tribes on Skandia, but may instead have placed them among the tribes on the southeastern Baltic coast.

In the 6th century AD, Jordanes wrote that among the many tribes inhabiting the island of Scandza were the Suehans and the Hallins. By the early 9th century AD the name Suehans was being used for Swedes, although, according to the scholar James Boykin Rives, "it is very difficult to assess the degree of ethnic continuity here, since it was a common practice in Carolingian times as well as earlier to apply old names to new people."

== Interpretations of the name ==
Since the name Hilleviones only appears in Pliny, several attempts have been made to connect the name with different tribes mentioned in other classical texts and with different ethnic groups of the modern era. A solution offered by some late 19th century and early 20th century scholars is that Hilleviones is a corruption of the phrase ille and (S)uiones, but this approach requires an alteration of the original text. (Similar references to "textual errors" or "corruption of the archetype manuscript" were also used by early 20th century scholars in order to equate Ptolemy's Leuonoi with the Suiones mentioned by Tacitus.)

Another idea is that the Hilleviones were an early population of Halland in Sweden. This idea is based on discussions about a common root in the two names and suggestions that the tribe name has been preserved in the name of the province. If so, the Hilleviones could be the same as the Hallin, of Scandza, who are mentioned by Jordanes. Hilleviones could be segmented Hill-eviones, where the -eviones would have the same etymology as for the Auiones. The Hil- or Hal- therefore would represent the name of the people. Other scholars have suggested a possible connection to the Helveconae of the southern Baltic coast.

Finding ways to equate Pliny's Hilleviones, Tacitus' Suiones and Jordanes' Suehans was a goal pursued with special vigor in the 17th century by the Rudbeckians of the Swedish Hyperborean School, who hoped to show that Sweden was not only the home of the original Goths, but also the "womb of mankind". In the center of this movement was Uppsala professor and poly-scientist Olaus Rudbeck (1630–1702), whose work is described by Flemming Lundgreen-Nielsen, professor, Department of Scandinavian Studies and Linguistics, University of Copenhagen as follows: "By means of fantastical etymologies and bold combinations of historical and scientific facts, Olaus Rudbeck showed that Sweden was the cradle of mankind and all early civilization, identifiable with Plato's lost continent of Atlantis. He considered the Swedish language to be the mother of all other tongues and saw Greek and Roman mythology as distorted versions of now-lost Swedish proto-myths." The efforts to construct a long, glorious history for Sweden became a political aim at the time of the Thirty Years War and culminated with the era of Swedish Empire expansionism.

== Linguistic Grouping ==
In early Germanic linguistics and ethnography (such as the work of 20th-century scholar Gudmund Schütte), "Hillevionic" or Scandic-Hillevionic was sometimes used to categorize the earliest recorded North Germanic tribal groups or dialects of the Scandinavian Peninsula, distinguishing them from the Gothic-Vandalic (East Germanic) and West Germanic groups (Ingaevones, Irminones, and Istvaeones).

== See also ==
- Germanic peoples
- History of Scandinavia
