= Mount Lykaion Hippodrome =

Ancient Greek hippodrome

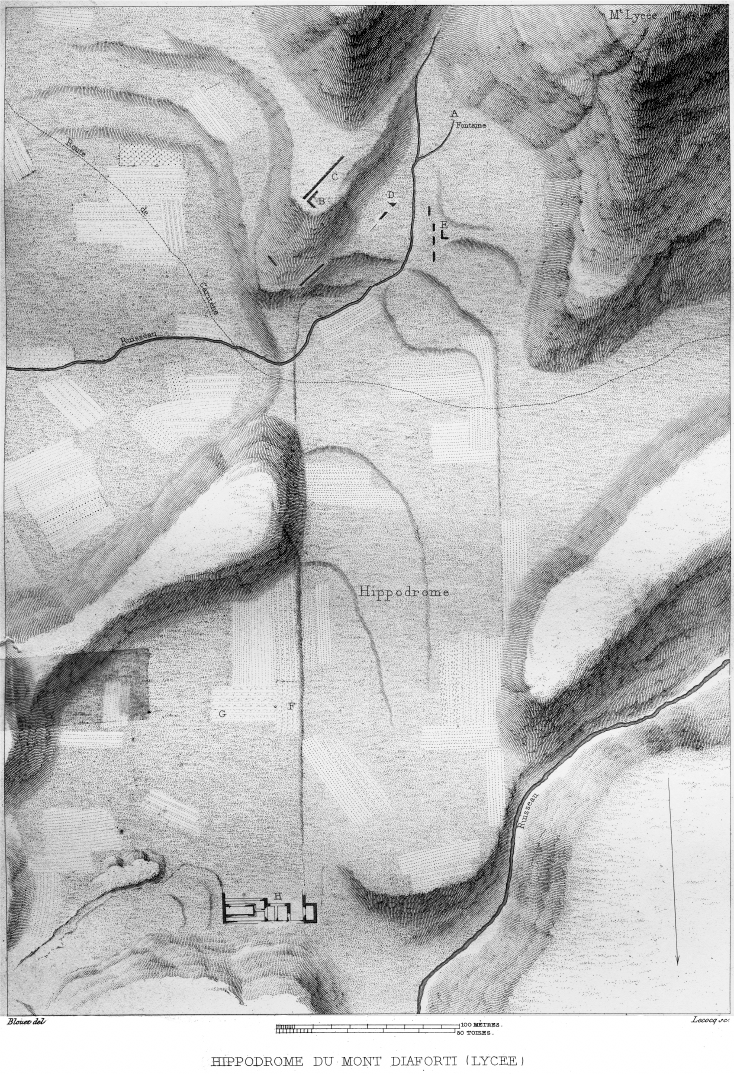
- A sketch of Mt Lykaion Hippodrome from 1833
- Interactive map of Mount Lykaion Hippodrome
- 37°27′02.54″N 21°59′41.03″E
- Type: Circus
- Location: Mount Lykaion in Arcadia, Greece

The Hippodrome of Mount Lykaion is an ancient Greek circus located on Mount Lykaion in Arcadia, Greece.

== History ==
Built sometime after the 7th century BC, the Hippodrome held Pan-Arcadian and Pan-Hellenic horse races as part of the Lykaia games every four years to honour Zeus.

=== Mount Lykaion Games ===
According to Pausanias, the Lykaia were older than the Panathenaic Games. According to two late 4th-century BC inscriptions, the hippodrome held two-horse chariot races, four-foal chariot races, four-horse chariot races, and horseback races. Races held at the hippodrome peaked around the 4th century BC.

Around 308–304 BC, Ptolemy I’s son, Lagos participated and won a two-horse chariot race. Activity in the hippodrome ceased sometime in the 3rd century BC.

== Re-discovery ==
Pausanias mentioned a hippodrome while talking about the sanctuary of Pan:

There is on Mt. Lykaion a sanctuary of Pan and around it a grove of trees, and a hippodrome and in front of it is a stadium. In the old days they used to hold here the Lykaion Games. Here there are also bases of statues, with now no statues on them. On one of the bases an elegiac inscription declares that the statue was a portrait of Astyanax, and that Astyanax was of the race of Arceas.

=== Archeology ===
The first excavations were made by the Archaeology Society of Athens run by K. Kontopoulos in 1897, and K. Kourouniotis in 1902. He found circular bases, presumed where the turning posts may have been. Recently the two turning posts have been confirmed by excavations, made of three unfluted tapering limestone drums.

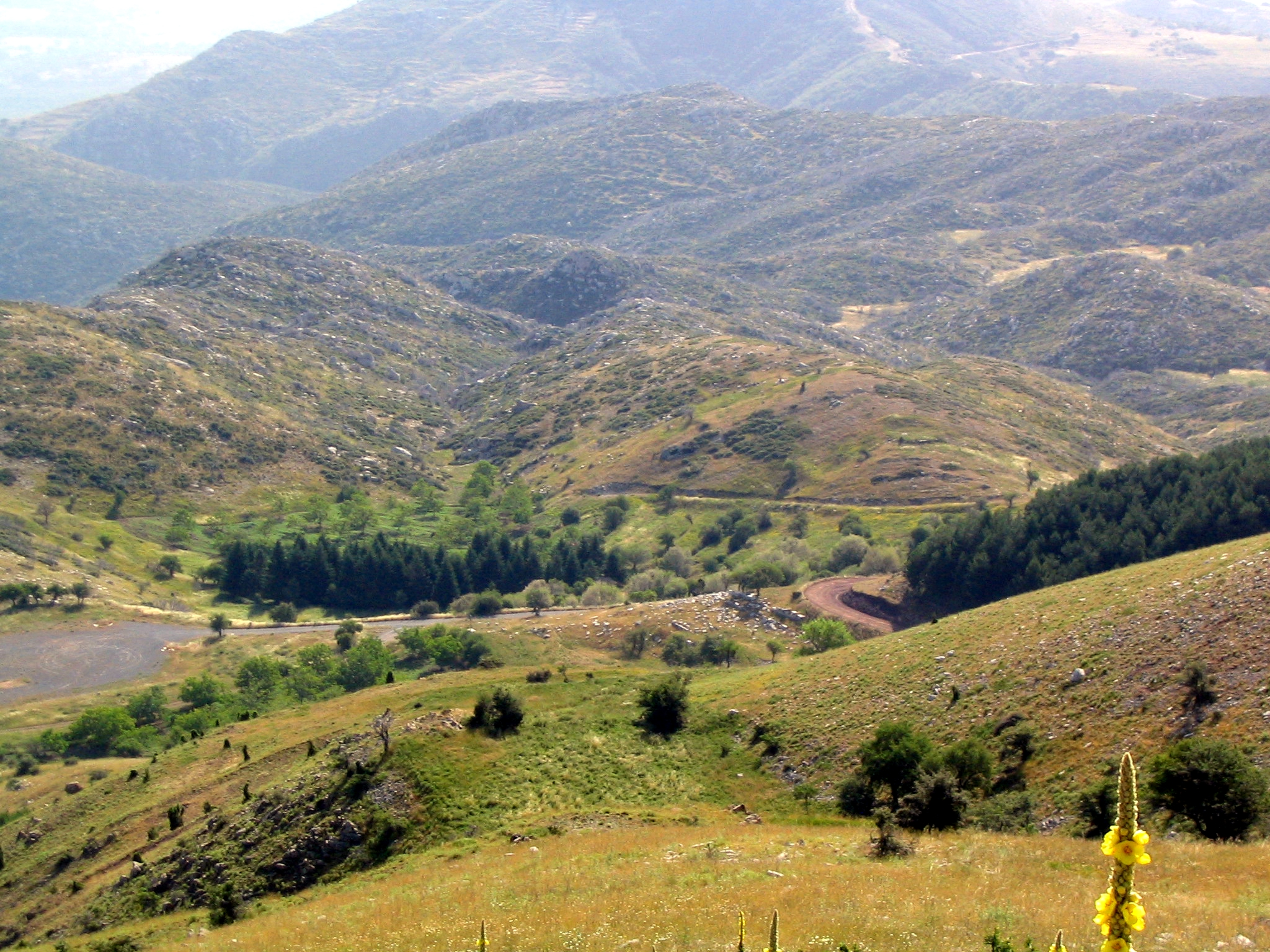
A view from the summit of Mt. Lykaion, Arkadia, Greece, looking east toward the lower site of the sanctuary of Zeus, including the stoa and hippodrome.

Between 2006 and 2015, excavations showed that the floor of the hippodrome was hard clay and the southern end had a foundation of cobblestone and tiles. It measured 250 x 50 m and is located on a terrace immediately adjacent to, and lower than, the stadium where its outline can still be seen in the lower meadow.

=== Modern Lykaion Games ===
Since 1973 every summer the modern Mount Lykaion games have been held every four years as a nine-day regional and cultural festival. At dawn, nine modern priestesses carry a flame from the Temenos of Zeus to the hippodrome. Runners from first to third place win a bronze tripod and a crown.
