= Martellus =

Martellus is a given name. Notable people with the name include:

- Henricus Martellus Germanus (fl. 1480–1496), German geographer and cartographer
- Martellus Bennett (born 1987), American football player
