= Lycaea =

Town in the northwest of ancient Arcadia

Lycaea or Lykaia (Ancient Greek: Λύκαια), also known as Lycoa or Lykoa (Λυκόα), was an ancient town in the northwest of ancient Arcadia not far from the river Alpheius, near its junction with the Lusius or Gortynius, at the foot of Mount Lycaeus, the sanctuary where the Lykaia ganes were held.

Pausanias writes of the Lycaeatae (Λυκαιᾶται) as a people in the district of Cynuria, and Stephanus of Byzantium mentions the town.

Its site is unlocated.
