= Agriopas =

Ancient Greek writer

Agriopas (Ancient Greek: Αγριόπας) (Note: Although some of the extant manuscripts of Pliny have this name as "Acopas" or "Copas"; other works give us the possible names of "Scopas" or "Apollas".) was a writer of ancient Greece mentioned by Pliny the Elder. He was the author of an account of the Olympic victors, called the Olympionicae. His exact date of birth is unknown.

Agriopas is also sometimes cited by writers on werewolf mythology. These writers have handed down Agriopas' tale of Demaenetus of Parrhasia who, during the Arcadian sacrifices for the festival of Zeus Lycaeus, tasted the viscera of a human child, and was turned into a wolf for ten years. At the end of those ten years he supposedly became a man again and competed in the ancient Olympic Games.

Agriopas was also in some manuscripts of Pliny given as the name of the father of Cinyras, rather than Apollo. Whether this is genuine or an error remains a matter of some debate.
