= Gadfly (mythology) =

Type of fly in Greek mythology

The gadfly (Ancient Greek: μύωψ or Ancient Greek: οἶστρος) a type of fly known for plaguing cattle, appears in Greek mythology as a tormenting force, often associated with the gods.

== Mythological appearances ==
When Io, a human lover of Zeus, was turned into a white heifer so that Zeus could hide her from his jealous wife, Hera, she was not fooled, and demanded Io as a gift from Zeus. She assigned Argus, the 100-eyed giant, the job of guarding Io but Hermes, following orders of Zeus, killed Argus and freed Io. When Hera found out, she sent a gadfly to torment and sting Io, forcing her to wander further and further away from home.

The gadfly plays a role in the myth of how Bellerophon loses Pegasus and the gods' favor. Bellerophon attempts to ride Pegasus to the top of Mt. Olympus, believing himself worthy of entering the realm of the gods. Zeus is enraged and sends a gadfly to sting Pegasus. The winged horse is startled and he rears backward. Bellerophon loses his grip and falls back to Earth. Athena spares his life by causing him to land on soft ground, but he becomes blind and wanders the earth alone until he dies.

== Metaphorical usages ==
The Odyssey tells a simile in Book 22 in which the suitors run like a herd faced with a gadfly as Athena holds up her aegis during the slaughter of the suitors.

The term οἶστρος in particular has a metaphorical link to pain, madness, strong desire, and frenzy.

Plato's Apology may use the image of the gadfly to display Socrates as someone who challenges the status quo.

== See also ==
- List of Greek mythological creatures
