= Aeternae =

Legendary creatures described in the travels of Alexander the Great

The Aeternae were a race of legendary creatures described in the travels of Alexander the Great. As Alexander's army passed northern Indian plains, they supposedly encountered the Aeternae, who killed some of Alexander's men after the men angered them. The Aeternae were described as killing and wounding enemies with "bony, saw-toothed protuberances sprouting from their heads."

== See also ==
- List of Greek mythological creatures
