= Tikbalang =

Philippine mythical creature

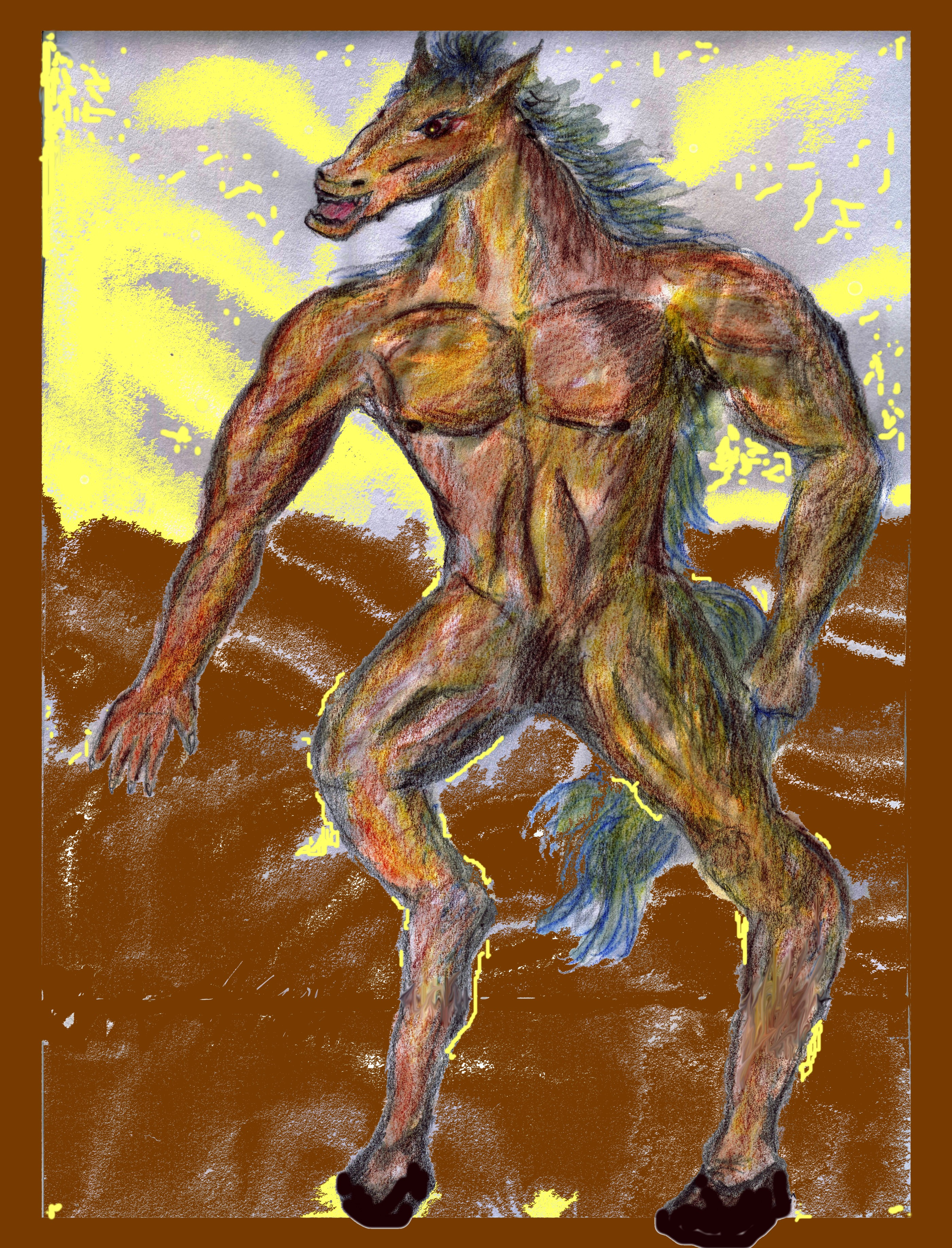

Creature information
- Grouping: Legendary creature
- Sub grouping: Hybrid beast
- Folklore: Philippine folklore

Origin
- Country: Philippines
- Habitat: Forests

The Tikbalang (/ˈtikbaˌlaŋ/) (also Tigbalang, Tigbalan, Tikbalan, Tigbolan, or Werehorse) is a creature of Philippine folklore said to lurk in the mountains and rainforests of the Philippines. It is a tall, bony humanoid creature with the head and hooves of a horse and disproportionately long limbs, to the point that its knees reach above its head when it squats down. In some versions, it is a transformation of an aborted fetus sent to earth from limbo.

== Descriptions ==
=== Early descriptions ===
As horses weren't native to the Philippines in the pre-Spanish era, the earliest written records about the tikbalang did not specify horse or animal morphology.

Documents from Spanish friars such as Juan de Plasencia's Customs of the Tagalogs (1589) describe the tikbalang as ghosts and spirits of the forests, associated with the terms multo and bibit.

Entries in early Spanish-Tagalog dictionaries defined tigbalang as "fantasma de montes" (phantoms of the mountains/wilds), linking them strongly as nature spirits.

Among the early Tagalogs, the derogatory expression “Tigbalang ca mandin!”, literally translated as “You are a wild beast!”, was used to describe a person whose behavior was considered improper or socially unacceptable. The expression conveyed disapproval toward individuals perceived as rude, uncivilized, uncultured, or lacking the manners and refinement expected within the community. Rather than simply referring to someone’s character, the phrase reflected how early Tagalog society viewed proper conduct and respectful behavior as important qualities in dealing with others.

There were also ghosts, which they called vibit; and phantoms, which they called 'Tigbalaang'.

— Customs of the Tagalogs (1589), Juan de Plasencia

The tigbalang is another object of which they stand in great awe. It is described as a phantom, which assumes a variety of uncouth and monstrous shapes, and interposes its authority, to prevent their performing the duties, prescribed by our religion.

— Estadismo (1803), Martinez de Zuniga

In historical dictionaries (San Buenaventura's 1613 Vocabulario spelled as "tigbalang"), they were likened to the tiyanac, while in some entries they were given the definition as "satyrs" (satiro), "gnomes" (duendes) or "goblins" (trasgo).

=== Horse-like appearance ===
Later on, as horses were brought from China and Japan through the Spanish colonial government, accounts of the tikbalang appearing horse-like slowly became the norm.

Juan Francisco de San Antonio's Cronicas(1738-1744) describes the tikbalang as a malevolent entity living in the mountains, able to shapeshift into a variety of forms, including horses.

450. They greatly fear and reverence the tigbàlang or bibit. This is a ghost, goblin, or devil; and as it knows the cowardice of these Indians, it has been wont to appear to them in the mountains—now in the guise of an old man, telling them that he is their nono; now as a horse; and now as a monster. Consequently, the Indians in their terror make various pacts with it, and trade their rosaries for various articles of superstitious value, such as hairs, grass, stones, and other things, in order to obtain all their intents and free themselves from all the dangers. Thus do they live in delusion until God wills that the evangelical ministers undeceive them, which costs no little [effort], because of the very great fear with which they are filled.

— Cronicas (1738–44), Juan Francisco de San Antonio

However, the very first document to actually describe the tikbalang as specifically having the appearance of a werehorse as it is more commonly known is Juan José Delgado's Biblioteca Histórica Filipina (orig. c. 1750).

Delgado recounts an alleged incident wherein a young boy from the town of San Mateo, after having escaped an attempted abduction by the tikbalang, described the creature as follows:

a very tall and skinny black man, with a long face like a horse, the shins of his legs reaching above his head when squatting down...(he had) very long ears and nose and somewhat short horns on his forehead, very large and frightening eyes, and the mouth of a horse.

Delgado also mentions the name "unglo" being used by the Visayans to refer to the same creature as the tikbalang.

== Behaviors ==
=== Association with trees ===
Individual tikbalangs, even today among superstitious Filipinos, are thought to inhabit trees as guardians (sometimes depicted as if the very soul of these trees). Specific trees (and nature in general) in pre-colonial Philippines were considered sacred (often used as shrines), esp. the large ficus trees (known locally as balete).

Tikbalang is generally associated with dark, sparsely populated, foliage-overgrown areas, with legends variously identifying their habitat as being beneath bridges, in bamboo clumps or banana groves, and atop Kalumpang (Sterculia foetida) or Balite (Ficus indica) trees.

=== Leading travellers astray ===
Tikbalangs or Tigbolan scare travelers, lead them astray and play tricks on them such as making them return to an arbitrary path no matter how far they go or turn. Wearing one’s shirt inside out is believed to counteract this. Another countermeasure is to ask permission aloud to pass by or, not to produce too much noise while in the woods in order not to offend or disturb the tikbalang. The "tigbolan" is a ghost which assumes a variety of forms, and sometimes confers a similar gift upon a certain favored individual. A superstition popular with the Tagalogs of Rizal Province is that Tikbalangs are benevolent guardians of elemental kingdoms. They are usually found standing at the foot of large trees watching around for anyone who dares to bestow malignancy on their kingdom's territory.

=== Shapeshifting ===
In some versions, the tikbalang can also transform itself into human form or turn invisible to humans. They like to lead travelers astray.

=== Getting married (sunshowers) ===
A common saying has it that rain from a clear sky means "may kinakasal na tikbalang." (Filipino, "a tikbalang is getting married".) This was potentially connected with a similar Spanish proverb that claimed a witch was getting married when there was rain on a sunny day, although many cultures have such sayings in which a trickster figure gets married (cp. fox's wedding, bear's wedding, monkey's birthday/wedding).

== Taming a tikbalang ==
By one account a tikbalang has a mane of sharp spines, with the three thickest of these being of particular importance. A person who obtains one of these spines can use them as an anting-anting (talisman) to keep the tikbalang as his servant. The tikbalang must first be restrained, however, by leaping onto it and tying it with a specially-prepared cord. The would-be-tamer must then hold on while the creature flies through the air, fighting madly to dislodge its unwelcome rider until it is exhausted and acknowledges its defeat. Or you can look on his mane and you will see 3 golden hairs and if you pluck three of them before he/she eats you, they will serve you until you die.

== In modern culture ==
In the 1880s, Filipino propagandist Mariano Ponce used the pen name "Tikbalang", among others, for his writings published in the Spanish-language newspaper La Solidaridad, which he co-founded with other propagandists.

In the early 1970s, sculptor Solomon Saprid made a series of expressionistic sculptures inspired by the tikbalang legend, highlighting more of its playful nature than the fearsome qualities it has often evoked in folklore.

Tame the Tikbalang, a Filipino punk rock band, emerged during the 1990s and became part of the country’s underground punk and metal music scene.

- In the 2015 documentary series, The Creatures of Philippine Mythology, the spread of Hinduism and the imagery of Hayagriva is tracked through Southeast Asia. It is speculated that Hayagriva influenced the present imagery of the horse-headed Philippine mythological spirit, the Tikbalang.
- A tikbalang named Lusyo features prominently in The Mythology Class, a graphic novel written and illustrated by Filipino comic creator Arnold Arre.
- Tikbalang Kung Kabilugan ng Buwan is a child-friendly telling of the Tikbalang mythos – written by Victoria Añonuevo, illustrated by Kora Dandan-Albano and released by Adarna House – intended to familiarize young Filipino audiences with Philippine Mythological creatures. In the story, a Tikbalang becomes lonely for isolated of a playmate during the full moon, a time when Filipino children of generations past traditionally went out to play in the moonlight. In a search for a playmate, the Tikbalang leaves his home in the Kalumpang tree and encounters first a Kapre, then a Nuno, an Aswang, and a Tiyanak before he finally meets another Tikbalang as a suitable playmate.
- A Tikbalang features as a fae in series 3, episode 10 ("Delinquents") of the SyFy supernatural drama Lost Girl.
- A Tikbalang was featured as the deity itself, another as a racecar driver, and more as the fighters in the fighting scene in the Netflix's Singaporean anime-influenced streaming television series based on the Filipino comic series, Trese, that was released the day before the Philippine Independence Day.
- Tikbalang is the name of a unit in the wargame Infinity, where many of the war machines are given mythological names.
- Tikbalang, along with other creatures, appeared in 1978 animated television film, Tadhana (lit. 'Destiny').
- Mobile Suit Gundam: The Witch from Mercury features a flight system called 'Tickbalang' that the series' mecha use for aerial transport.
- Tikbalang is depicted in an adult animated short film Fly Aswang, directed by Mark Galvez and produced by Imee Marcos.

== See also ==
- Ipotane
- Asura
- Andhaka
- Centaur
- List of fictional horses
- Sihuanaba
- Hippopodes
