= Hippopodes =

Mythological race of humanoids

Hippopodes, meaning "horse-footed," is an allegorical creature in Greek mythology that is often associated with greed. According to the myth, the Hippopodes were a tribe of beings with the lower bodies of horses and the upper bodies of men. They were said to have guarded a fabulous treasure, but their insatiable greed made them unwilling to share it with anyone. This greed ultimately led to their downfall. The allegory of the Hippopodes serves as a cautionary tale against the dangers of greed and avarice.

== Ancient sources ==
According to some ancient geographers, the Hippopodes shared an island with two other legendary races: the Panotti and Oeonae. Pliny the Elder's Natural History locates this island near the Scythian coast; Pomponius Mela's De situ orbis places it in or around the North Sea, mentioning it alongside Denmark and the Orkney Islands (Mela iii. § 56).

Adam of Bremen wrote in the 11th century that the Scritofinni could run faster than wild animals. Olaus Magnus addresses this in his work Historia de Gentibus Septentrionalibus, where he explains that the Scritofinni gets their name from the jumping motion they perform while hunting on skis. The same connection can also be seen in Abraham Ortelius's map Europam, Sive Celticam Veterem from 1595 where he places Hippopodes and Scricofinni in the same area of northern Scandinavia.

== Later accounts ==
The Travels of Sir John Mandeville places the Hippopodes in Maritime Southeast Asia, and adds that they are particularly fleet-footed and hunt by running down their prey.

A 2014 multispectral imaging project led by Chet van Duzer revealed that a c. 1491 map created by Henricus Martellus Germanus and likely used by Christopher Columbus located the Hippopodes in Central Asia.

== See also ==
- Ipotane
- Centaur
- Tikbalang
- Sihuanaba
