= Cretea =

Place at Mt. Lykaion in Greek mythology

Cretea (/ˈkriːti.ə/; Greek: Κρητέα) was the name of a place on the top of Mount Lycaeus, in Arcadia, on the left side of the grove of Apollo. The Arcadians called the mountain Olympus and "holy mountain". The mountain lies between the Alfeios River and the coast of Kyparissia. The Arcadians claimed that the Crete where the Cretan story has it that Zeus was reared was this place and not the island. Rhea went to Cretea in order to escape from her husband, Cronus, who ate their children, and she gave birth to Zeus there.
