= Khalkotauroi =

Creatures in Greek mythology

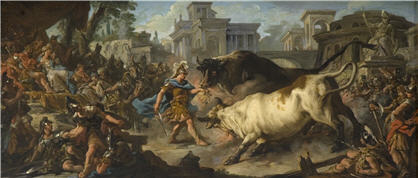
Jason taming the Khalkotauri in a painting by Jean François de Troy

Khalkotauroi (Greek: Χαλκόταυροι, romanized: khalkótauroi, from Ancient Greek: Ταύροι Χαλκαίοι, romanized: tauroi khalkeoi, lit. 'bronze bulls'), also known as the Colchis Bulls, are mythical creatures that appear in the Greek myth of Jason and the Golden Fleece.

== Mythology ==
The Khalkotauroi are two immense bulls with bronze hooves and bronze mouths through which they breathe fire. In the Argonautica, Jason is promised the prized fleece by King Aeetes if he can first yoke the Khalkotauroi and use them to plough a field. The field is then to be sown with dragon's teeth.

Jason survives the burning flames of the bronze bulls by rubbing on his body a magical potion that protects him from the heat. The potion has been provided by Medea, King Aeetes' own daughter, who has fallen in love with Jason.

The Khalkotauroi were a gift to King Aeetes from the Greek gods' blacksmith, Hephaestus.

He Hephaistos had also made for him Aeetes king of Kolkhis Bulls with feet of bronze the Khalkotauroi and bronze mouths from which the breath came out in flame, blazing and terrible. And he had forged a plough of indurated steel, all in one piece.

—Apollonius Rhodius, Argonautica 3.215

== See also ==
- List of Greek mythological creatures

== Bibliography ==
- Apollonius Rhodius, Argonautica translated by Robert Cooper Seaton (1853–1915), R. C. Loeb Classical Library Volume 001. London, William Heinemann Ltd, 1912. Online version at the Topos Text Project.
- Apollonius Rhodius, Argonautica. George W. Mooney. London. Longmans, Green. 1912. Greek text available at the Perseus Digital Library.
