= Henricus Martellus Germanus =

German cartographer (fl. 1480–1496)

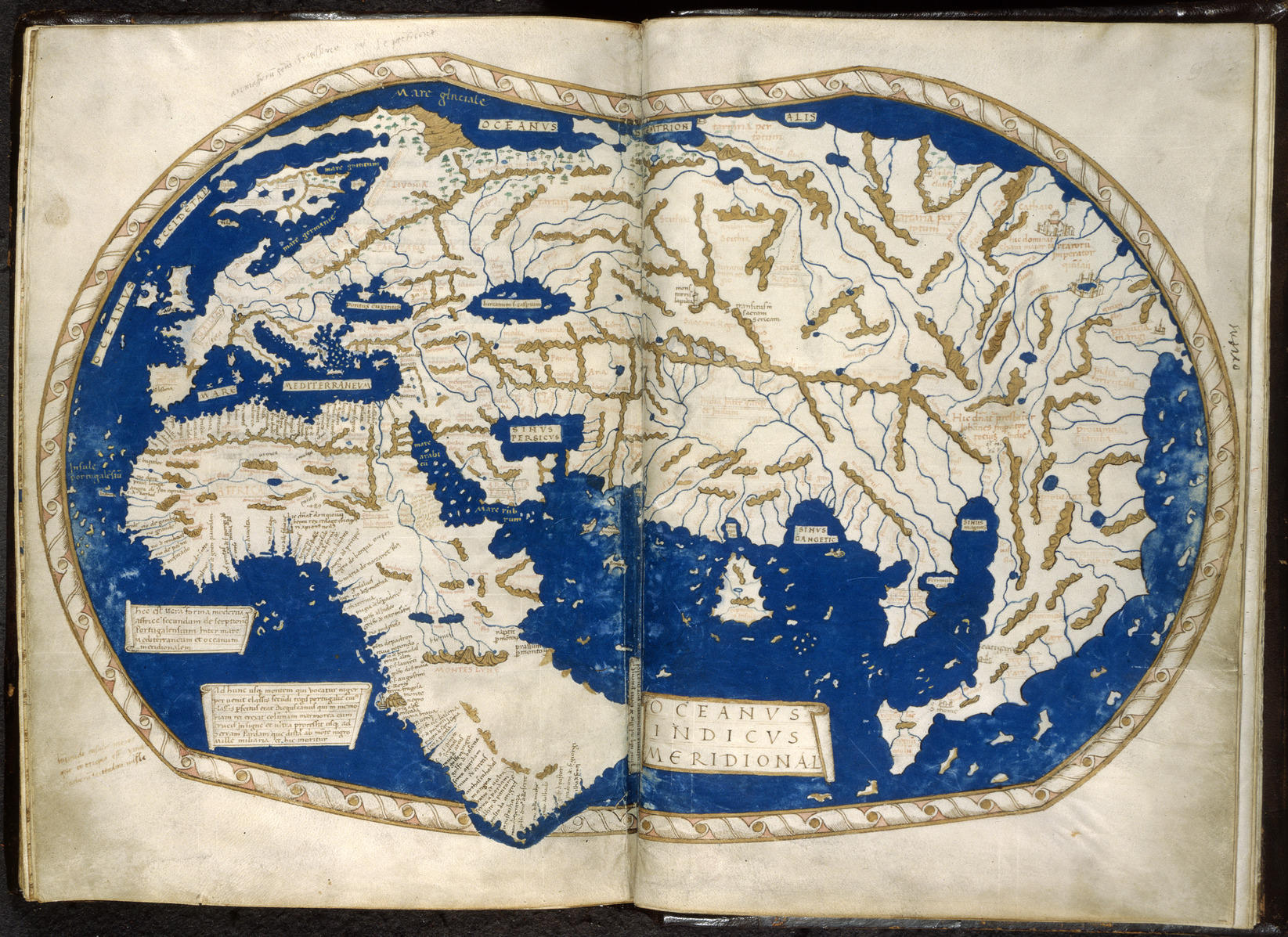
Map of the world by Henricus Martellus Germanus, preserved in the British Library

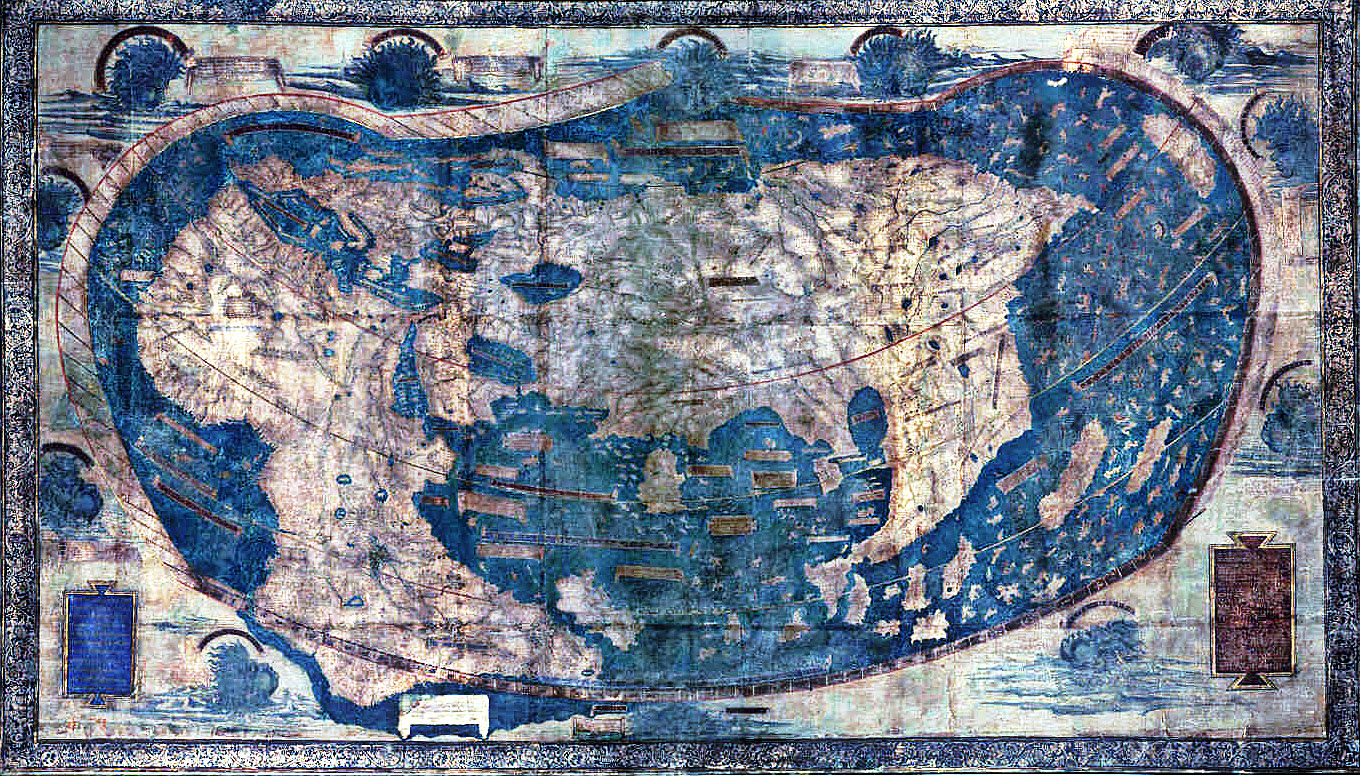
Map of the world by Henricus Martellus Germanus, preserved at Yale University

Henricus Martellus Germanus (fl. 1480–1496) was a German cartographer active in Florence between 1480 and 1496. His surviving cartographic work includes manuscripts of Ptolemy's Geographia, manuscripts of Insularium illustratum (a descriptive atlas of island maps), and two world maps which were the first to show a passage around the southern tip of Africa into the Indian Ocean. His world maps summarize geographical knowledge at the outset of the Age of Discovery and "epitomize the best of European cartography at the end of the fifteenth century."

== Biography ==
Very little is known about the life of Henricus Martellus Germanus. Even his name and place of birth have been the subject of much speculation. In the 15th century, it was common for scholars and artisans to adopt a Latinized version of their birth name. This was the case with Martellus. Germanus is the Latin word for Germany and it is the clearest indication of his origin. Some authors have assumed his birth name must have been "Heinrich Hammer" (the German translation of Henricus Martellus), but there is no documentary proof. It is possible that he was from Nuremberg, a center of the German Renaissance but, again, no direct evidence.

At the time, Florence was home to a significant population of German immigrants working as craftsmen and artisans, so Martellus's presence in the city would not have been remarkable. He was active in Florence between 1480 and 1496, spending at least some of that time in the workshop of Francesco Rosselli.

Nothing is known of his education or experience, although his work shows some influence of Nicolaus Germanus, another German cartographer active in Florence. His own assertion that he traveled extensively suggests that perhaps he was a merchant.

== Works ==
The surviving cartographic works attributed to Martellus include two world maps, manuscripts of Ptolemy's Geographia, and manuscripts of Insularium illustratum (a descriptive atlas of island maps).

=== World maps ===
Between around 1489 and 1491, he produced at least one world map which is remarkably similar to the terrestrial globe produced by Martin Behaim around 1492, the Erdapfel. Both show novel adaptations of the existing Ptolemaic model, opening a passage south of Africa and creating an enormous new peninsula east of the Golden Chersonese (Malaysia). Both possibly derive from maps created around 1485 in Lisbon by Bartolomeo Columbus.

A manuscript world map, measuring 201 by 122 centimetres (79 in × 48 in) in size, was rediscovered in the 1960s and donated to Yale's Beinecke Rare Book and Manuscript Library. An inscription in the lower left corner states: "Although Strabo and Ptolemy and the majority of the ancients were most assiduous in describing the world we, however, bring together in this picture and carefully show in their true places the new knowledge that escaped their diligence and remained unknown to them". Another world map by Henricus Martellus Germanus is in the British Library's collection.

A 2014 multispectral imaging project led by Chet van Duzer revealed many previously illegible details of the map, including a depiction of a porcupine in northern Asia, references to mythological peoples such as the Hippopodes and the Panotti, and a surprising amount of information about the interior of Africa – knowledge that likely originated with the Ethiopian delegation to the 1441 Council of Florence.

=== Ptolemy's Geographia ===
Around 1480, Martellus produced his earliest known work, a manuscript of Ptolemy's Geographia. This first version followed the standard Ptolemaic model, a traditional world map and twenty-six regional maps using a trapezoidal projection. A later version was produced for his patron, Camillo Maria Vitelli. In addition to the traditional maps, Martellus added a number of new maps (tabulae modernae) including maps of Mediterranean islands, Asia Minor, northern Europe, the British Isles and a nautical map of the north African coast. In a preface he claims his maps contain all the ports and coasts newly discovered by the Portuguese.

=== Insularium illustratum ===
Martellus also produced an Insularium illustratum ("Illustrated Book of Islands") of which five manuscripts are extant, plus one working copy in the Biblioteca Laurentiana. It contains an illustrated description of islands of the Aegean Sea, mostly copied from a previous work by Cristoforo Buondelmonti. Buondelmonti's isolario (island book) had been copied many times during the 15th-century but Martellus added other Mediterranean islands such as Corsica, Sardinia and Sicily to his version, and he was the first to add islands outside of the Mediterranean, including Britain and Ireland. He was also the first to add several regional maps and a world map. In particular, the British Library manuscript contains his most important, detailed, and widely reproduced world map.

== Influence ==
Martellus' map served as one source for the Waldseemüller map of 1507. The overall layout was similar, and Martin Waldseemüller used the same projection as Martellus, the pseudo-cordiform projection. Both cartographers added decorative wind-heads in the borders of their maps, and both also took advantage of the extra space in the lower corners of the maps created by the swooping lines of the projection to add text blocks in those corners. The shape of northern Africa is the same on both maps; that is, it is Ptolemaic with a sharp northwestern corner. The shape of eastern Asia is also similar on the two maps, with a huge peninsula jutting southwestward into the Indian Ocean, and Japan is in precisely the same position on the two maps, at the eastern edge.

He has been identified with an Arrigho di Federigho who authored the first translation into German of Bocaccio's Decamerone. According to this theory, the surname Martellus comes from the Martelli family, to which Henricus/Arrigho was linked.

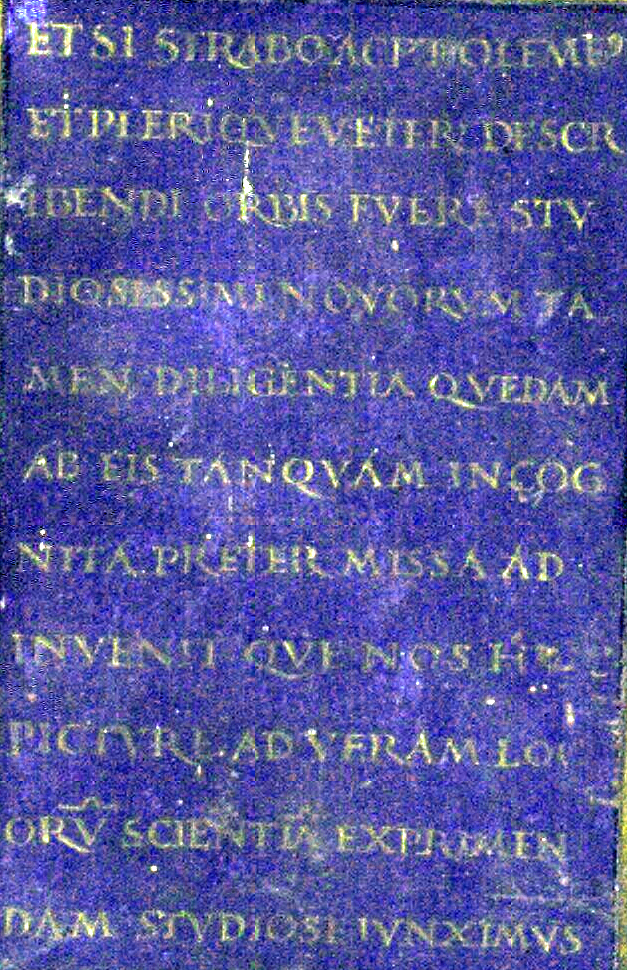
Henricus Martellus, explanatory inscription on his world map of 1491
