= Arae =

Greek divinities of curses, oath enforcement

In Greek mythology, the Arae (/ˈɛəriː/; Ancient Greek: Αραι) were female spirits of curses, particularly of the curses placed by the dead upon those guilty of their death; they were associated with the underworld. They can also curse men such that the cattle of the sun god Helios would have done if they were harmed by any man, as in Homer's Odyssey.

== Mythology ==
The Arae are sometimes identified with the Erinyes.

=== Bacchylides' account ===
"[She] is exceedingly angry with her father, and in her affliction she makes supplication to the nether-world Arai (Curses), poor wretch, that he complete a bitter and accursed old age for keeping his daughter alone indoors and preventing her from marrying, although the hair will turn white on her head."

=== Aeschylus's accounts ===
"We (the Erinyes) are the eternal children of Nyx (Night). We are called Arai (Arae, Curses) in our homes beneath the earth."

"Chorus: And it is the eternal rule that drops of blood spilled on the ground demand yet more blood. Murder cries out on the Erinys (Fury), which from those killed before brings one ruin in the wake of another.

Orestes: Alas, you sovereign powers of the world below, behold, you potent Arai (Curses—i.e. the Erinyes) of the slain, behold the remnants of the line of Atreus in their helpless plight, cast out from house and home in dishonor. Which way can we turn, O Zeus?"

"Klytaimnestra: 'O Ara (Curse—i.e. the Erinys) [Erinys] that haunts this house (of the Atreides), so hard to wrestle down: how far forward you look! Even what was laid well out of harm's way you bring down with your well-aimed shafts from far off, and you strip me of those I love (i.e. her lover and cohort in murder, Aigisthos), utterly wretched as I am.'"

"(Eteokles, King of Thebes, prays before the battle of the Seven Against Thebes:) 'O Zeus and Ge (Earth), and gods that guard our city, and Ara (Curse), potent agent of my father's Erinys (Vengeance), do not destroy my city, ripping it up from its foundations, captive of the enemy, a city that speaks in Greece's tongue, and do not destroy our hearths and homes.'"

"Ah, you (Oedipus) have wreathed your race with many troubles! In the final outcome the Arai (Curses—i.e. the Erinyes) have raised their piercing cry, now that the family is turned to flight in all directions."

=== Suda ===
"Arai kata oikhomenon (Curses on those who have passed away): Look under such [stones] of the black-hearted Styx (hold) you."

"([In Sophocles' Electra] Electra says:) 'O house of Haides and Persephone! O Hermes Khthonios (Of the Underworld) and holy Ara (Curse) and divine Erinnyes (Furies)! You who watch over those dying unjustly and those being robbed of a marriage bed: Come! Help avenge the murder of our father!"
