= Ethiopian pegasus =

Legendary creature from Medieval bestiaries

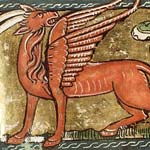
Ethiopian Pegasus, Der Naturen Bloeme manuscript (c. 1350), National Library of the Netherlands

An Ethiopian pegasus is an animal from medieval bestiaries. According to Pliny the Elder, they were a breed of two-horned, winged horses from Ethiopia. They reportedly lived on an island in the Red Sea off the coast of Eritrea.

In antiquity and the Middle Ages, authors used "Aithiopia/Ethiopia" broadly, often meaning areas south of Egypt where people had darker skin than the Greeks.

== See also ==
- Pegasus
- Winged Unicorn
