= Povitrulya =

Ukrainian mythological character

Origin
- Country: Ukraine
- Region: Carpathian Mountains

Povitrulya (Ukrainian: Повітруля) is a national Ukrainian mythological positive character.

== Description ==
They are associated with the element of wind (daughter of mountain winds); are light, able to move in the air without touching the ground, often depicted with wings and dressed in flowers from head to toe. Although mostly described as a fair-haired beauty, she can change her appearance from young to old and vice versa. They love to help lovers in love affairs. They come from the Carpathian region in Ukraine. It is believed that if someone dreams of a loved one for nine nights in a row, then on the tenth night, Povitrulya descends from the sky in her image. Shepherds, who refuse nothing to their aerial mistresses, never lose their sheep.

Povitruli can be attributed to the demonological characters of the so-called "lower mythology" (as well as rusalki, mavki), which is characterized by stability and has remained almost unchanged until now, because it was less influenced by Christianity than "higher" (belief in the main gods).

== Legends and beliefs ==
In the summer, the young shepherd returned to his hut at midnight. On the lake, he suddenly saw a bunch of girls of unusual beauty. One of them especially stunned him. The next time, on the advice of the old shepherd, he hid in the moss in the same place and stole the wings of his beloved. The povitruli could not catch up with him, but his beloved came to his cradle. He married her, a boy was born. One day the man was gone, and the povitrulya stole back her wings, although the old shepherd advised him to burn them on the pyre. She flew off to her friends - you can't change windy women. They, like wolves, always look into the forest, that is, for harm. The shepherd longed for her very much, he could not find a place for himself. Finally, he left his fellow shepherds and went into the woods to look for his wife. And found in the cave, with his son. "Get out of here, in a good way," she said, "or my sisters will fly back with our mother and tear you to shreds." But he burned her wings, forbade her to fly into harm's way and led her to the shepherd's hut.

=== In fiction ===
In his individual myth-making, V. Pachovsky depicts the Povitrulya as one of the types of Rusalka (mermaids). According to the poet himself, these are "airy mermaids with wings, hidden by superstition in Transcarpathia". But unlike traditional mermaids, who have a harmful influence, they are endowed with only positive traits. Since the Povitrulya has the ability to move through the air thanks to its wings, for the lyrical hero of Pachovsky's poem "Red rose, white lily..." it is the embodiment of the spirit of the native land. In the poem "My Lucy, the heart is sick" an antinomy between Rusalka and Povitrulya is created, where the Rusalka is the embodiment of female attractiveness, temptation that brings disappointment, and the air is a symbol of creativity, inspiration, one of the guises of the Muse:

Goldwing Povitrulya

She removed the haze from her eyes, I looked into her face - But you, my princess, In the summer, wings are equal to me,

My Muse, my world!

== See also ==
- Mavka
- Rusalka
- Motanka
- Swan maiden
