= Aethon =

Set of mythological Greek characters

The ancient Greek word aithōn (αἴθων) means "burning", "blazing" or "shining." Less strictly, it can denote the colour red-brown, or "tawny." It is an epithet sometimes applied to animals such as horses at Hom. Il. 2.839; oxen at Od.18.372; and an eagle at Il. 15.690 (cf. Hyginus' calling Aëtos, the eagle that tormented Prometheus, an aethonem aquilam at Fabulae 31.5.). In English, aithōn may be written Aethon, Aithon or Ethon. In Greek and Roman mythology there are a number of characters known as Aethon. Most are horses, variously belonging to:

- Helios
- Ares
- Hector
- Pallas
- Hades (Claudian)

The name is twice applied to humans. In Odyssey 19.183, it is the pseudonym a disguised Odysseus assumes during his interview with Penelope upon his return to Ithaca. According to fr. 43a.5 of Hesiod's Catalogue of Women, Erysichthon of Thessaly was also known as Aethon due to the "burning" hunger (aithōn limos) he was made to endure by Demeter.

== See also ==
- Chrysoritis aethon, a species of butterfly
