= Pech (mythology) =

The pech were a type of gnome-like creatures in Scottish mythology. They were of short height but extremely strong. They brewed heather ale and battled against the Scots.

== Mythology ==
In one fairy tale, an old blind pech is on his deathbed. He asks two young men if he can feel their arm muscles, to feel how strong they've grown. One of the youths plays a prank on him, giving him a metal cup instead of his arm. The pech elder snaps the metal cup with his fingers, shattering it, to the amazement of the youths. Even sick on his deathbed, he is stronger than them.

The Pech were thought to be one of the aboriginal builders of the stone megaliths of ancient Scotland, along with giants. They might be related to the Picts and pixies.
