= Ipotane =

Mythical Creature

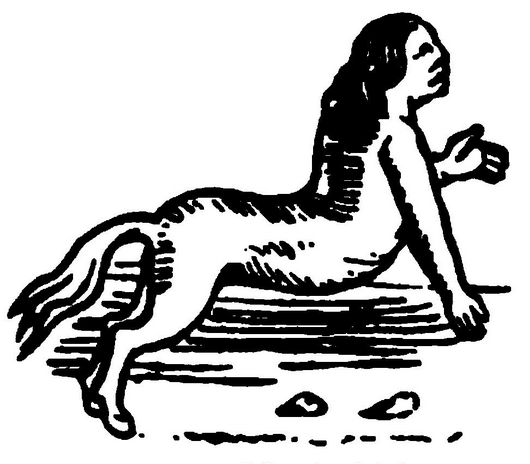
An ipotane as depicted in The Travels of Sir John Mandeville

Ipotanes or hippotaynes are mythical creatures. They are usually depicted as being half-human half-horse creatures much different from the centaurs. Although sometimes attributed to Greek mythology, the term appears to have originated at a much later date, and without a definite description; they are first mentioned in John de Mandeville's fourteenth-century Travels. Ipotanes appear in modern works of the fantasy genre.

== John de Mandeville ==
In his 1356 travelogue, The Travels of Sir John Mandeville, the author reports the existence of a violent race of ipotanes, found in Bacharie (Bactria).

...ben many Ipotanes that dwellen sometime in the water and sometime on the land; and thei ben half men and half hors and thei eten men when thei may take him

— Wyken and Worde, 1499.

More recent editions of Mandeville's work use various spellings; hippotaynes (Macmillan, 1900), hippopotami (Penguin, 1983).

== Description ==
The word "ipotane" appears to be derived from the Greek ιππότης (hippotes), "a knight", which itself is derived from ίππος (hippos), "a horse". Mandeville's description is not clearly distinguishable from that of a centaur, and some depictions use the term synonymously. Some depictions show ipotanes with a human body and a horse's head. Other depictions have them as humans with the hindquarters of a horse.

== Modern literature ==
Despite their similarity to centaurs, ipotanes are not mentioned in the corpus of Greek and Roman literature. However, they appear in modern works of fantasy literature, in which they are depicted with various combinations of horse-like and human features.

== See also ==
- Hippopodes, Greek myth
- Tikbalang, Philippine folklore
- BoJack Horseman, fictional character
- Glaistig, Scottish folklore
- Sihuanaba, Central American folklore
