= Leontophone =

Small animal from Medieval bestiaries that is deadly to lions

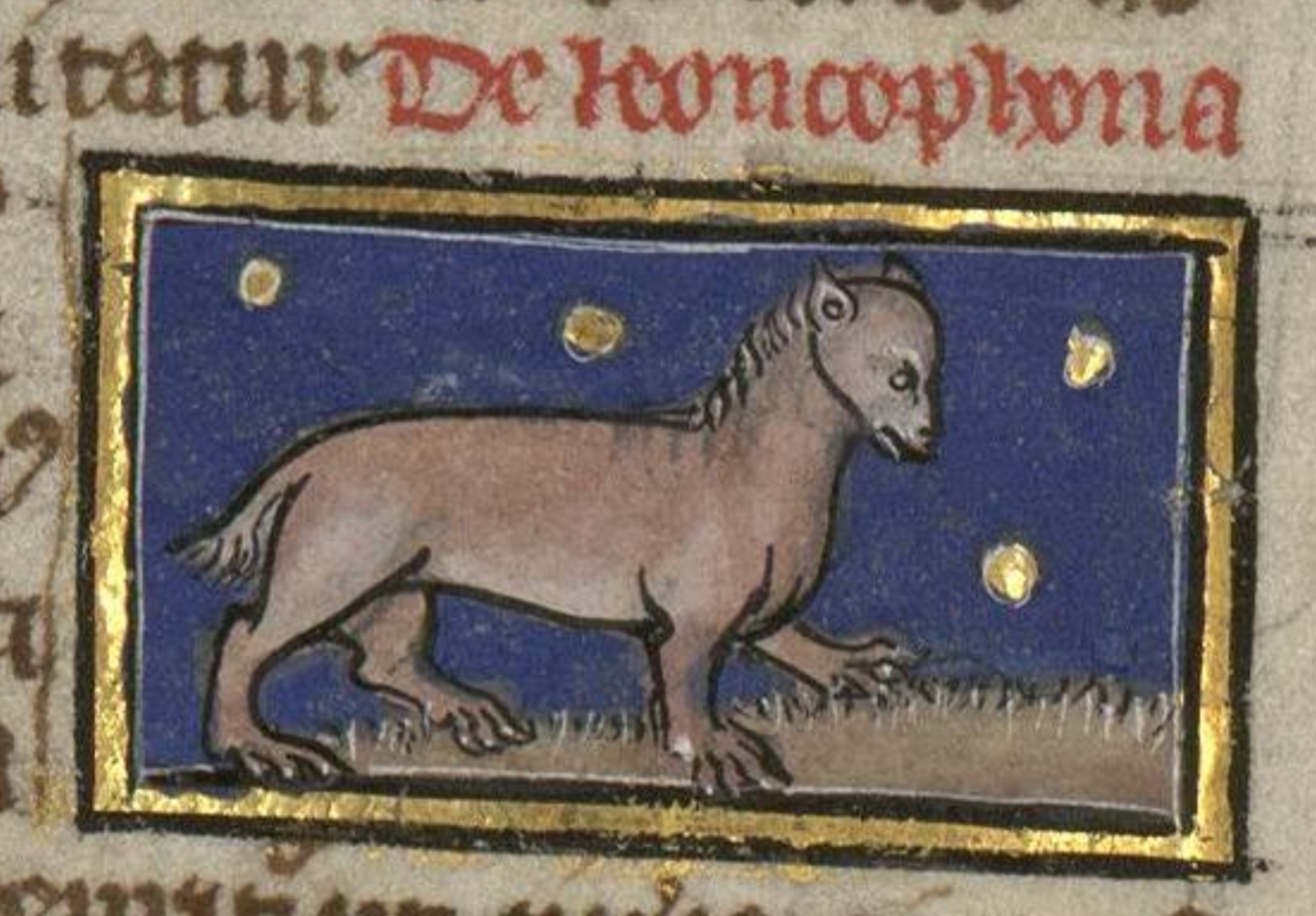
Leontophone appearance in a Medieval bestiary

Leontophone (Leontophonus, Leontophonos, Leophontes, from Ancient Greek: λεοντοφόνος, meaning "lion-killer") was a small animal, most probably legendary, that was deadly to lions. The first written record is from Greco-Roman writers, but it was also known later during the Medieval period, in Medieval bestiaries.

Leontophones are described as fatally poisonous to lions, such that a lion will die if it merely bites a leontophone. In a proper ritual, the leontophone's flesh is burned and its ashes are sprinkled on a piece of meat, which is placed at a crossroad; if a lion eats even a small amount of the tainted meat, it dies. The ancients considered this method a 'happy arrangement', since both lions and leontophones die in the process; from this, one can safely assume that not only were lions considered dangerous, but that leontophones may have been considered pests.

Likewise, due to the danger they pose to lions, lions instinctively hate leontophones. Confronted by a leontophone, they often hunt and kill them, tearing them apart with their claws rather than biting them. However, some sources state that the lion will instead flee from the small creature, only attacking and killing it when left with no option to flee (since attacking the leontophone may cause it to urinate, and the urine of the leontophone is also fatally poisonous to lions).

Though no sources give a definite depiction of the leontophone's appearance, some sources speculate that the creature looks like a small boar or a small bear, while others speculate that it is serpentine (with some referring to it even as a small 'worm', the medieval term for a dragon).
