= Psychai =

Psychai are the diminutive, winged shades of the dead in Greek mythology and some fifth century BC funerary lekythoi. Although commonly translated as "soul" today, in the epics of Homer, it meant "life" and did not have any connection to consciousness or psychological functions in the living. It is only later, at the end of the fifth century BC in the works of other poets such as Pindar, that the word acquires its meaning relating to being the principal seat of intellect, emotion, and will. From there, it became possible to translate psyche as "heart" or "soul".

== See also ==
- Soul
- Spirit
