= Pandi (legendary creature) =

The Pandi (or Pandae) in Medieval bestiaries and Greco-Roman geographic works were a race of giant-eared people with eight fingers and toes; further, they had white hair that turned black with age. In his Indica, the historian Ctesias located them in the mountains of India; he describes them as a warlike race of bowmen and spearmen and claims that they are born with a full set of teeth. Pliny the Elder, in his Natural History, adds that they live for 200 years.

== In popular culture ==
=== In literature ===
In The Burning Maze, they are depicted as loyal servants to the now god-emperor Caligula.

== See also ==
- Panotti
- Macrobians
