= Oeonae =

The Oeonae or Oönæ were a mythical human race appearing in works of classical geography such as Pomponius Mela's De situ orbis and Pliny the Elder's Natural History. They were said to subsist exclusively on oats and the eggs of marsh birds; further, they were reported to share an island with the Panotti and Hippopodes.(Mela iii. § 56).
