= Mount Lykaion =

Mountain in Greece

- Λύκαιος ορος Mons Lycaeus
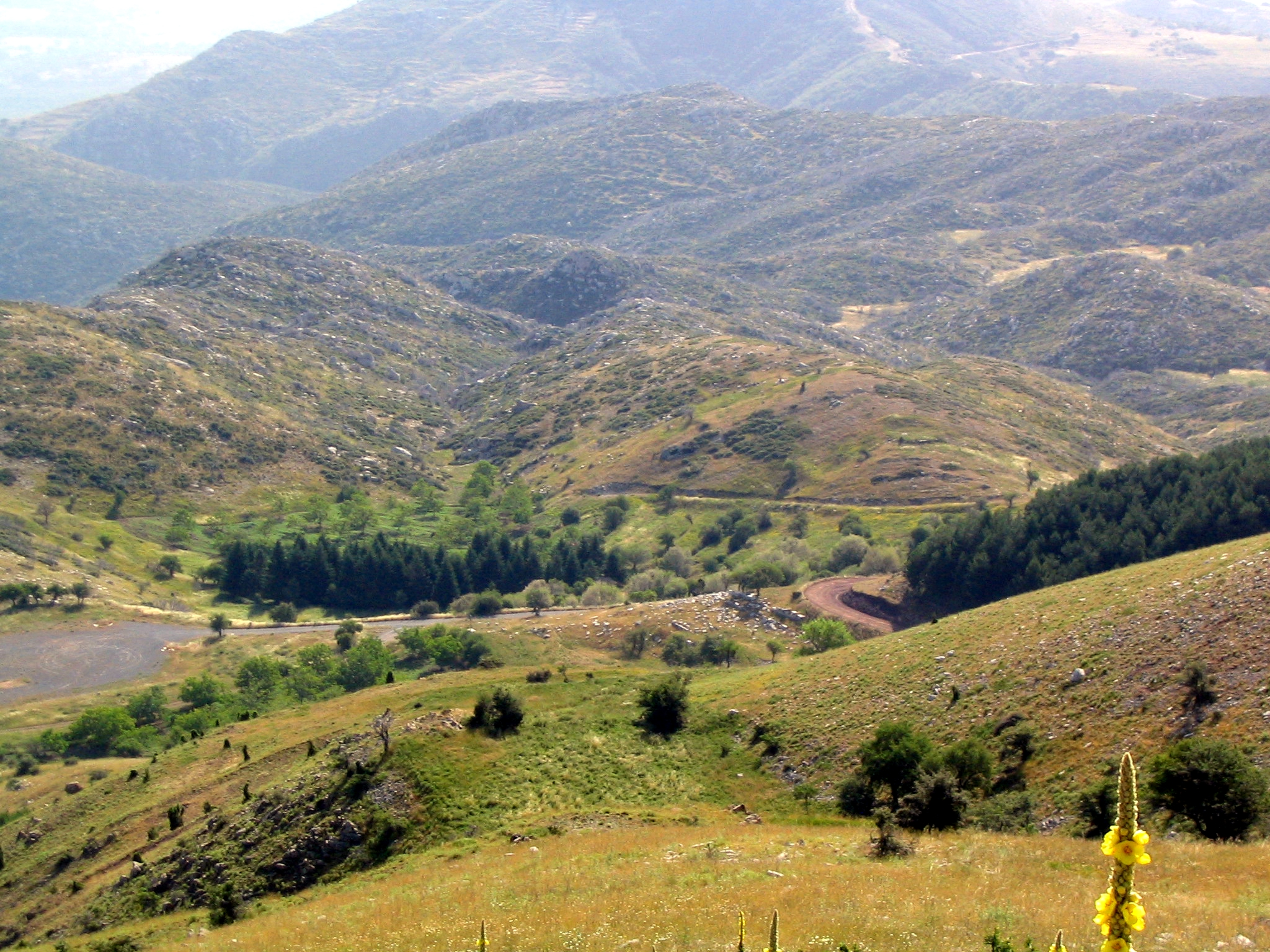
- A view from the summit of Mt. Lykaion, looking E toward the stoa and hippodrome.

Highest point
- Coordinates: 37°27′25″N 21°58′30″E

Geography
- Location within Greece
- Location: Arcadia, Greece

Mount Lykaion (Ancient Greek: Λύκαιον ὄρος, Lýkaion Óros; Latin: Mons Lycaeus) is a mountain in Arcadia, Greece. Lykaion has two peaks: Stefani to the north and St. Ilias (Άγιος Ηλίας, Agios Īlías) to the south where the ancient altar of Zeus is located. The northern peak is higher, 1,421 m, than the southern, 1,382 m (4,662 and 4,534 ft).

Mount Lykaion was sacred to the god Zeus Lykaios, who was said to have been born and raised there. The mountain was also thought to be the home of the mythical Pelasgus and his son Lycaon, who were said to have founded the ritual of Zeus practiced on its summit. In antiquity, it was alleged that this involved a human sacrifice and a feast in which the man who received the portion of a human victim was changed to a wolf, as Lycaon had been after sacrificing a child. The altar of Zeus on the upper sanctuary discovered there, which may have been called Cretea, consists of a great mound of ashes with a retaining wall. It was said that no shadows fell within the precincts and that any who entered it died within the year.

The extensive sanctuary lower down the mountain played host to athletic games held every four years, the Lykaia.

The town of Lycaea was probably at the foot of the mountain according to Polybius while Stephanus of Byzantium also mentions the town.

The Mt. Lykaion Excavation and Survey Project, a joint effort of the University of Pennsylvania and the University of Arizona began work at the site in 2004 continuing the topographical survey begun in 1996 and carrying out a full topographical and architectural analysis not only of the altar and temenos, but of the nearby valley where the Lykaian Games were held.

== History ==
Mt. Lykaion, its religious significance and its quadrennial athletic games (Lykaia) appear with some frequency in the ancient literary sources. In the 2nd-century AD Pausanias provided the greatest amount of information on Lykaion's mythological, historical, and physical characteristics. More isolated references occur, however, in sources ranging from Plato to Virgil.

Pausanias states that the Arcadians claimed Cretea Mt. Lykaion as the birthplace of Zeus, although tradition had handed down at least two other locations for Zeus’ birth.

Lycaon, son of Pelasgus, the mythical founder of the Greek race, is said to have instituted the worship of Zeus at Mt. Lykaion, giving the god the epithet Lykaios and establishing games in his honour. The Bibliotheca, a Roman-era mythological compendium, adds the story that Lycaon attempted to test Zeus’ omniscience by tricking him into eating a sacrifice mixed with human flesh. In punishment, Zeus slew Lycaon and his fifty sons. Other sources, including the Roman poet Ovid, claim instead that Lycaon's punishment was transformation into a wolf, an early example of lycanthropy.

According to Pausanias and Polybius, an inscribed pillar (stele) was erected near the altar of Zeus on Mt. Lykaion during the Second Messenian War, a revolt against the Spartans. The inscription supposedly commemorated the execution of Aristocrates of Arcadia, who had betrayed the Messenian hero Aristomenes at the battle of the Great Trench.

Thucydides, historian of the Peloponnesian War, writes that the Spartan king Pleistoanax lived on Mt. Lykaion while in exile from the mid-440s BC until 427, where he built a house straddling the sacred region (temenos) of Zeus to avoid further persecution.

In his Stratagems, the 2nd-century Macedonian rhetorician Polyaenus describes the Battle of Mount Lykion between the Spartans and Demetrius of Macedon in 294 BC. Mt. Lykaion extended between the camps of the two sides, causing some consternation among the Macedonians due to their unfamiliarity with the terrain. Nevertheless, Demetrius’ forces won the battle with relative ease.

Polybius and Plutarch cite a battle at Mt. Lykaion in 227 BC between the Achaean League under Aratus and the Spartans under Cleomenes III. Although the details are vague, both authors make it clear that the Achaeans were defeated and that Aratus was believed (mistakenly) to have been killed.

=== Religious worship ===
==== Zeus Lykaios ====
Pausanias records the presence of a mound of earth on the highest point of the mountain, an altar to Zeus Lykaios. He describes two pillars near the altar which had once been topped by golden eagles. Although Pausanias alludes to secret sacrifices which took place on this altar, he explains that he was reluctant to inquire into these rites due to their extreme antiquity. Pausanias also discusses the temenos of Zeus, a sacred precinct which humans were forbidden to enter. He notes the common belief that any person entering the temenos would die within a year, along with the legend that all creatures, human and animal alike, cast no shadow while inside the sacred area.

==== Pan ====
Pausanias also describes a sanctuary of Pan surrounded by a grove of trees. References to Lykaian Pan are especially abundant in Latin poetry, as for instance in Virgil's epic, the Aeneid: “Lupercal / Parrhasio dictum Panos de more Lycaei,” “...the Lupercal, named after the Parrhasian worship of Lykaian Pan,” and in Horace's Odes: “Velox amoenum saepe Lucretilem / mutat Lycaeo Faunus,” “Often swift Faunus [Pan] exchanges Lykaion for pleasant Lucretilis.”

=== Games ===
The Lykaia, held every four years, receive occasional mention in the literary record. Authors are in disagreement as to when exactly the games were first instituted: Aristotle is said to have ranked the Lykaia fourth after the Eleusinia, the Panathenaia, and the Argive games, while Pausanias argues for the Lykaian competition's priority to the Panathenaia. Pliny the Elder states that the Lykaia were the first to introduce gymnastic competition.

The games included footraces for men and for boys, various chariot races with teams of adult and juvenile horses, boxing, wrestling, and a pentathlon.

Pindar records the victories of several athletes in his Victory Odes, and two inscribed stelae recently excavated from the Lykaian stadium provide information about the events, participants, and winners at the games.

== The site ==
Recent excavations revealed the Ash Altar and temenos, two fountains including the Hagno fountain mentioned by Pausanias, the hippodrome, the stadium, a building that was probably a bathhouse, the xenon (hotel), a stoa, several rows of seats and a group of statue bases.

Many of these buildings seem to have been planned in relation to each other: the baths at the northern end of the stadium are on the same alignment and the stoa, the xenon, the lower fountain, and the rows of seats all appear to have been built in an intentionally similar alignment. Just to the north of the stoa four rows of seats were excavated, with the remains of a group of stelae and statue bases nearby. These would have bordered the stadium's southern edge, and correspond to an earlier excavated row of seats on the south-eastern edge of the racetrack. The majority of the spectators of events in the stadium, however, would have sat on the surrounding hills.

=== Stadium ===
Recent archaeology has shown that the stadium (for athletic events) is located on a terrace 2-3 m above and to the west of the hippodrome.

Seven stone starting line blocks were discovered at the northern edge of the dromos or racetrack.

The fountain building likely provided water for the athletes and a corridor southwest of the stadium probably linked the sanctuary to the stadium.

Two inscriptions were uncovered in the excavations of Kouriouniotis that give the names of winning athletes.

=== Hippodrome ===
The hippodrome at Mount Lykaion is located in a valley below and to the northeast of the altar, and is said to be the only extant hippodrome from Greek antiquity. It measured 250 x 50 m and was used for the equestrian events of the Lykaia. It is located on a terrace immediately adjacent to, and lower than, the stadium where its outline can still be seen in the lower meadow.

The hippodrome was constructed on roughly a north-south orientation with a retaining wall of about 140 m along the eastern side curving around the northern end. Modern excavations have discovered portions tapering column drums that may belonged to the turning posts at either end of the racecourse.

=== Ash altar ===
A circular altar of blackened earth about 1.5 m in height and 30 m in diameter is composed of the burned ash of the victims that have been dedicated to Zeus and seems to date from before the migration of Indo-European peoples into the area.

An excavation in 2007 revealed pottery fragments and signs of activity in the ash altar from as early as 3000 BC. Pottery and finds such as miniature tripods, knives, and statuettes of Zeus holding an eagle and a lightning bolt show that there appears to have been a continuous use of the altar from the Mycenaean period, approximately 1500 BC to the Hellenistic period, 323-31 BC.

A number of drinking vessels and bones of sheep and goats from the Late Helladic period indicates that the altar was the site of Mycenean drinking and feasting rituals, probably in honor of Zeus. An especially interesting discovery was a seal ring from the Late Minoan period (1500–1400 BC), which could indicate some interaction between Mt. Lykaion and Crete, both of which are given as the birthplace of Zeus by ancient sources.

Nearby Olympia (only 22 miles away) has a similar ash altar, and both settlements held ancient athletic games. The extremely early date of activity at Lykaion could suggest that these customs originated there.

It constitutes the first known example of a Mycenaean mountain-top altar and may correspond to a Linear B mention of an "open-fire altar"; Linear B (14th–13th centuries BC) inscriptions also give the first mentions of offerings to Zeus and of the sacred precinct (temenos) near an altar.

== Modern study ==
After 1832, when Greece had gained independence from the Ottoman Empire, European travelers and scholars began to systematically tour Sparta and the Peloponnese. Ernst Curtius, Charles Beulé, and Guillaume Blouet published scholarly studies of the area, and discussions of the region appeared in German and British travelogues as well. Many of these writers used Pausanias as their guide to the geography and sights of the region, but were also concerned to correlate modern Greek place-names with ancient evidence.

Beulé described the hippodrome and surrounding area, including large stones that he assumed formed had formed the seats of the judges and magistrates, and the remains of a building he called a temple to Pan, but which probably corresponds to the stoa of the modern excavations. The German writer Ross described the bathhouse and its ancient but still-visible cisterns, which site he noted the locals called the Skaphidia.

Mt. Lykaion was initially excavated by the Greek Archaeological Service, first in 1897 by archaeologist K. Kontopoulos and again in 1902 by K. Kourouniotes. Kontopoulos dug several trial trenches near the hippodrome and the altar. Kourouniotes's excavations of the altar and surrounding area (the temenos) were particularly informative; he learned that the altar consisted of a raised mound of blackened earth as described by Pausanias. Excavation of the earth of the altar yielded burnt stones, small animal (cow and pig) bones, tiny pottery fragments, iron knives, clay figures, coins from Aegina, a clay figure of a bird, and two small bronze tripods. Further trenches dug in the temenos produced several bronze figures, some iron objects, and roof tiles. In 1909 Kourouniotes excavated an area at the east of the mountain and beneath the summit, the site of the hippodrome, stadium, and bathhouse.

Since Kourouniotes's excavation, anthropologists and scholars of Arcadian religion have studied the site in terms of its development as a sanctuary, but there was no further systematic or scientific investigation until 1996, when Dr. David Gilman Romano of the University of Pennsylvania conducted a topographical and architectural survey of the site. Romano continued his work with the Mt. Lykaion Excavation and Survey Project under the auspices of the University of Pennsylvania and the University of Arizona. A preliminary planning phase of cleaning and surveying took place in 2004 and 2005, and was followed by a five-year excavation program beginning in June 2006.
