= Chet van Duzer =

American historian of cartography

Chet Van Duzer (born 1966) is an American historian of cartography.

== Life ==
He was born in 1966, and grew up in Northern California.

He graduated from UC Berkeley.

He is a member of the board of the Lazarus Project at the University of Rochester.

== Career ==
From 2011 to 2012, he was a scholar-in-residence at the John W. Kluge Center at the Library of Congress.

He has also received a Kislak Fellowship for the Study of the History and Cultures of the Early Americas.

== Bibliography ==
His notable books include:

- Sea Monsters on Medieval and Renaissance Maps ISBN 9780712357715
- The World for a King: Pierre Desceliers' Map of 1550 ISBN 9780712356183
- Apocalyptic Cartography: Thematic Maps and the End of the World in a Fifteenth-Century Manuscript ISBN 9789004304536
- Johann Schöner's Globe of 1515 : Transcription and Study ISBN 9781606180051
- Floating Islands: A Global Bibliography, With an Edition and Translation of G. C. Munz’s ‘Exercitatio academica de insulis natantibus’ (1711) ISBN 9780975542408
- Seeing the World Anew: The Radical Vision of Martin Waldseemüller's 1507 & 1516 World Maps ISBN 9781929154470
- Christopher Columbus: Book of Privileges: 1502 The Claiming of a New World ISBN 9781929154531
