= Damarchus =

Ancient Greek boxer

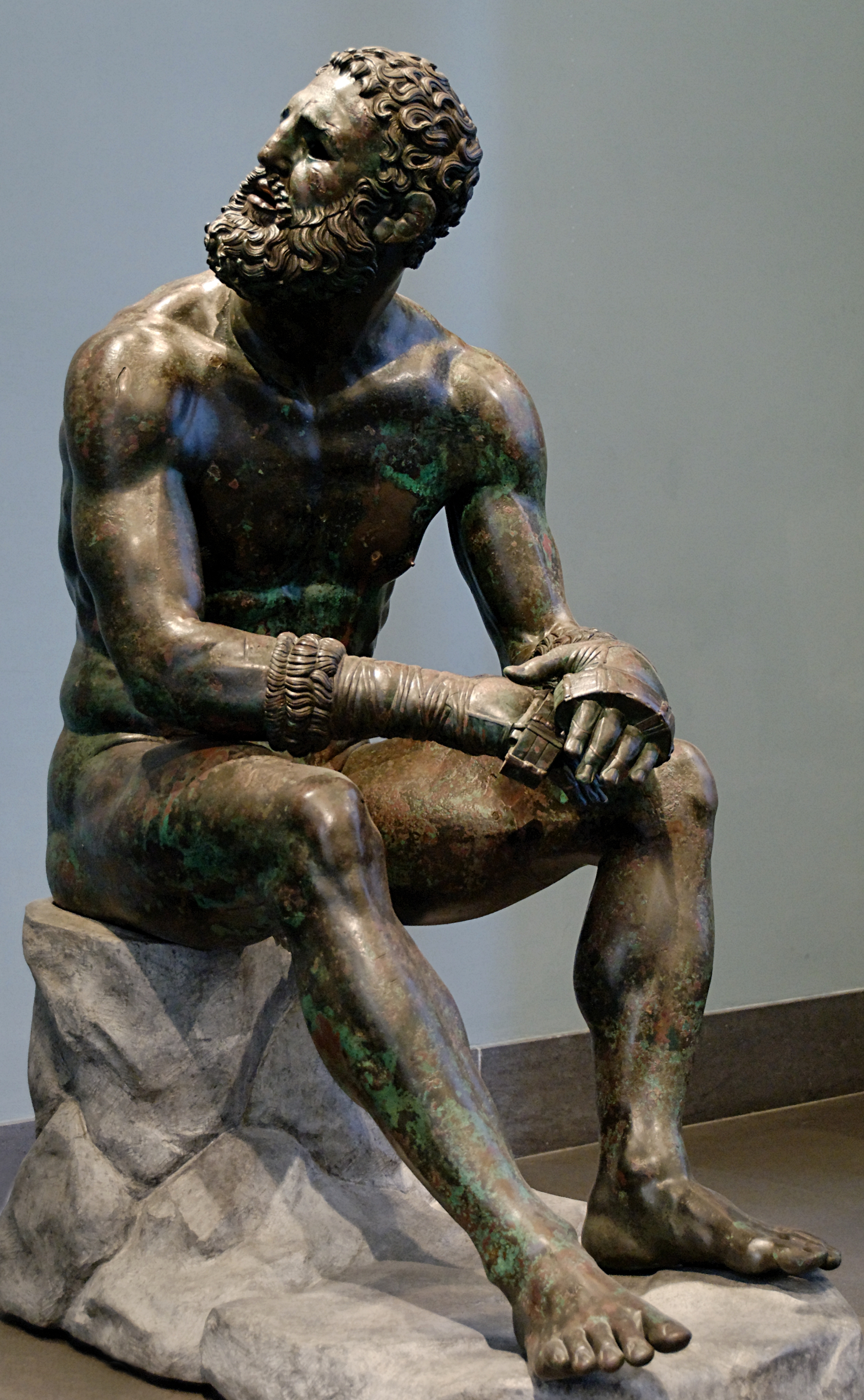
The Boxer of Quirinal (Museo delle Terme, Rome)

Damarchus (Greek: Δάμαρχος) or Demaenetus was a victorious Olympic boxer from Parrhasia (Arcadia) who is said to have changed his shape into that of a wolf at the festival of Lycaea, only to become a man again after ten years. Pausanias investigated the story for his famous work Description of Greece and, while he seems to believe that Damarchus the boxer did indeed exist, he notes that Damarchus' inscription at Olympia mentions nothing about his supposed metamorphosis to a wolf.

The festival of Lycaea involved human sacrifice to Zeus. A young boy was killed and then consumed by one of the participants, in this case by Damarchus, and as a result Zeus would transform the cannibal into a wolf. According to Pausanias, the werewolf could once again live as a man provided he abstained from human flesh for nine years; if, however, the wolf tasted the flesh of a man, he would remain a beast forever.

Augustine and Pliny agree with the main aspects of the story but claim the requisite waiting period was ten years, not nine. The story is briefly alluded to in Plato's masterpiece, The Republic, however in Plato's version there is no suggestion that the change could be undone.
