= Lykaia =

Ancient Greek festival in Arcadia

In Ancient Greece, the Lykaia (Greek: Λύκαια) was an archaic festival with a secret ritual on the slopes of Mount Lykaion ("Wolf Mountain") in Arcadia. The rituals and myths of this primitive rite of passage centered upon an ancient threat of cannibalism and the possibility of a werewolf transformation for the epheboi (adolescent males) who were the participants. The festival occurred yearly, probably at the beginning of May.

The epithet Lykaios ("wolf-Zeus") is assumed by Zeus only in connection with the Lykaia, which was the main Arcadian festival. Zeus had only a formal connection as patron of the ritual. In the founding myth, of Lycaon's banquet for the gods that included the flesh of a human sacrifice, perhaps one of his sons, Nyctimus or his grandson, Arcas, Zeus overturned the table and struck the house of Lycaon with a thunderbolt; his patronage at the Lykaia can have been little more than a formula. Long afterward, in the late 3rd century CE, the philosopher Porphyry reported that Theophrastus had compared the sacrifice "at the Lykaia in Arcadia" with Carthaginian sacrifices to Moloch.

The ritual was nocturnal, to judge from the name of Nyctimus (nyx, "night") that was given to the son of Lycaon who was killed and served up as part of the feast to Zeus. Rumors of the ceremony that circulated among other Greeks revolved around the theme of human sacrifice and cannibalism: according to Plato, a particular clan would gather on the mountain to make a sacrifice every nine years to Zeus Lykaios, and a single morsel of human entrails would be intermingled with the animal's. Whoever ate the human flesh was said to turn into a wolf, and could only regain human form if he did not eat again of human flesh until the next nine-year cycle had ended. The traveller Pausanias told of an Olympic boxing champion Damarchus of Parrhasia, who had "turned into a wolf at the sacrifice to Zeus Lykaios, and changed back into a man again in the ninth year thereafter", from which Walter Burkert affirms that, for Damarchus to have successfully participated at least nine years later, the participants in the ritual feast must have been ephebes.

There were several sites. At the summit on Mount Lykaion Pausanias saw the ash-pile altar to Zeus but, as attending the rite was impossible, he was obliged to "let it be as it is and as it was from the beginning".

Near the ancient ash-heap where the sacrifices took place was a forbidden precinct in which, allegedly, no shadows were ever cast. Anyone who entered would have to be sacrificed. There was the cave of Rhea, the Kretaia, where, according to local legend, Zeus was born and was cared for by the nymphs. There were games associated with the satisfactory completion of the Lykaia, which removed in the 4th century to Megalopolis; when it was founded in 371 BCE, Megalopolis was the first urbanization in rustic Arcadia; there the major temple was dedicated to Zeus Lykaios, though the Arcadians continued to sacrifice on the mountain-top to Pausanias' day (2nd century CE).

Modern archaeologists have found no trace of human remains among the sacrificial detritus, but recent discoveries at the mountain-top ash-heap altar that Pausanias saw but was reluctant to pry into, reveal that it was much older than the Classical Greeks themselves realised. Early 20th century excavations at the site had revealed nothing earlier than ca. 700 BCE, but the Greek-American interdisciplinary Mt. Lykaion Excavation and Survey Project excavated a trench and detected ritual presence at the site at the beginning of the third millennium BCE, a thousand years before Zeus was worshiped in Greece. A Late Minoan rock crystal seal bearing the image of a bull was a notable surprise.

== Apollo Lykaios ==
The god Apollo as worshipped in the cultic practices on Mount Lykaion was referred to as Apollo Lykaios. Much scholarly debate continues on the nature of the epithet "Lykaios" beyond its geographical and cultic significance. Assertions as to Apollo having an archaic wolf-form are speculative at best (and likely based on historically contested etymologies).

The figure of Apollo Lykaios should not be confused, however, with the famous Apollo Lyceus, the distinctive statue type of the god that was displayed in the Lyceum in Athens where Aristotle taught. This figure is completely unrelated to Apollo Lykaios. Likewise, Lycian Apollo refers to the Apollo cult in the Anatolian kingdom of Lycia, across the Aegean, and not Lykaia.

== Lykaian Pan ==
A sanctuary of Pan was also located upon the mountain. According to tradition, Evander of Pallantium, son of Hermes, led a colony from Pallantion in Arkadia into Italy, where he built a town Pallantion on the Palatine, and introduced the cult of Pan Lýkaios and the festival of the Lykaia, which later became the major Roman festival of Lupercalia.

== Modern Lykaia ==
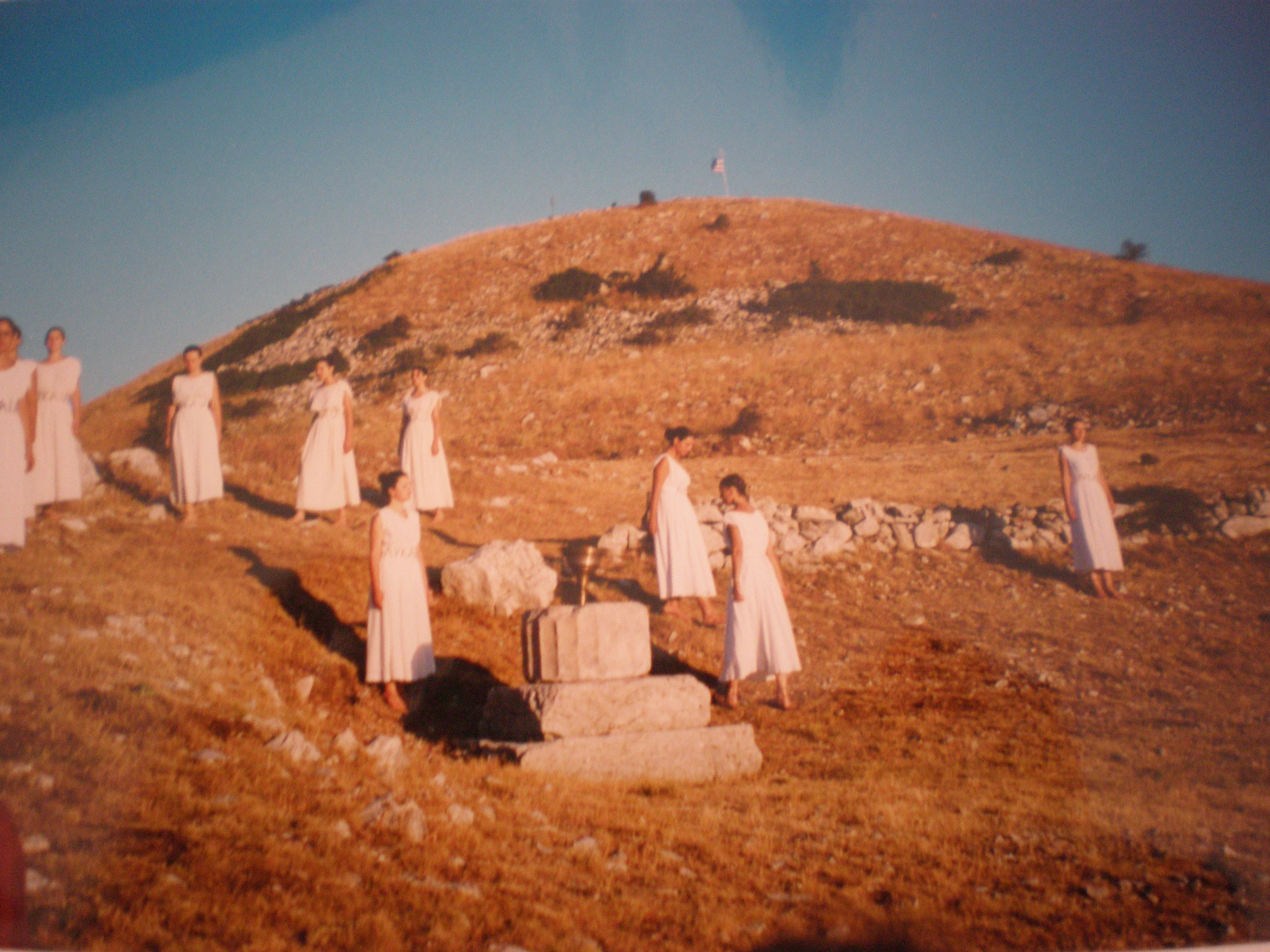
The lighting of the flame at Lykaia in August 2005

In 1973, the Ano Karyes (ΑΝΩ ΚΑΡΥΕΣ) Association "O Lykaios Dias (Ο Λύκαιος Δίας)" established the modern Lykaia, which are held every four years on the same place as the ancient games. The motto of these games is "Laurels, not prizes" (Greek: "Στεφανίτες" και όχι "Χρηματίτες"), meaning that the purpose of these games is solely the moral perfection of man and not rewarding the winners with pecuniary means. Modern Lykaia are usually held in the beginning of August. The games begin with the lighting of the flame on the Arcadian's sacred peak. The Estiades of Mount Lykaion, making their appearance from the north, bring the Arcadian's eternal flame. The first Estiada walks slowly towards the southern pillar base (where two golden eagles were placed in ancient times) and lights the torch. The head priestess recites the Lycean Ode by Pindarus and then gives the torch to an athlete named as torch-bearer. The torch-bearer then runs into the stadium and lights the altar which is placed there. The closing ceremony includes cultural events, the lowering of the flag and the playing of the Greece's national anthem. The winner of each athletic event is awarded with an olive branch, a cup, a tripod, a medal or a diploma. All the athletes who participated-regardless of their performance-receive a certificate of participation, thus justifying the Games' motto. The 9th Lykaia were held from 29 July to 7 August 2005. The 10th games took place in the summer of 2009. The 11th games took place from 27 July to 4 August 2013. On the last day (4 August) the athletic events of track and field took place at the mountain stadium. The 12th Lycae games were held in the summer of 2017. The 13th celebration was held from July 31 to August 7, 2022.

== Sources ==
- Potamianos, K. Mount Lykaion Throughout the Centuries. Edition of the Kotylio Association, Athens 2005.
- This year, the sacred flame of Lycaea. "Apodemon Epos" Magazine of European Art Center (EUARCE) 2st issue 1997 p. 1-2
- "Lykaea". '"EI" Magazine of European Art Center (EUARCE) of Greece, 3st issue 1993'

-Georgia Simopoulou, The revival of "Lykaea" - a historical route p. 52-54

-Ulrich Sinn, The Sanctuary of Zeus Lykaios. p. 55

- "Lykaea". '"EI" Magazine of European Art Center (EUARCE) of Greece, 13st issue 1996'

-"Lykaea", p. 15 -"The "Lykaea" for all Hellenismus", p. 39

-Amalia Chajianagnostou, "The Mt. Lykaeon, the Sanctuary Mount of Arcades", p. 40

-Plyxeni Kasda, "The strength of the little one", p. 41
