= Panotti =

Mythical race of people

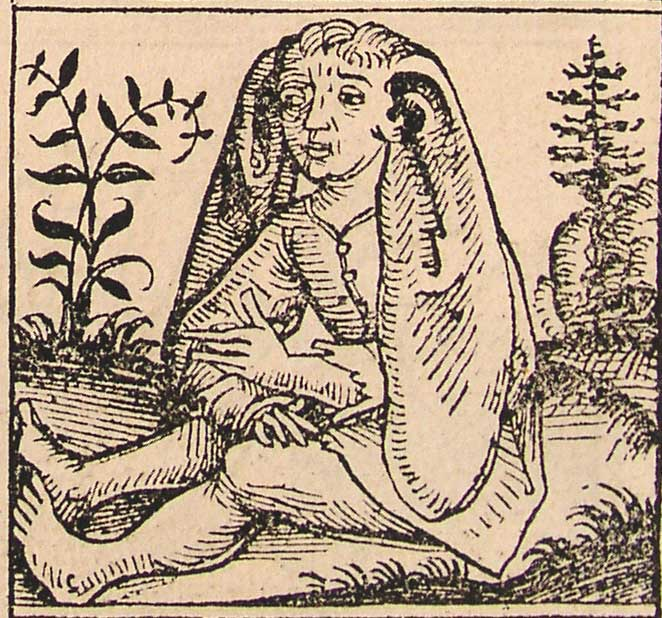
Depiction in the Nuremberg Chronicle (1493)

The Panotti (also called Phanesii, Panotii and Panotioi, from the Greek words πᾶν and οὖς for "all ears") were a mythical race of people, described as possessing large ears that covered their entire bodies.

== Pliny the Elder ==
In AD 77–79, the classical writer Pliny the Elder published his thirty-seven volumes of encyclopedic works known as the Natural History containing entries of both the real and the imaginative.

In the Natural History, Pliny writes about the strange race of people known as the Panotti who live in the "All-Ears Islands" off of Scythia. These people there have bizarrely large ears that are so huge that the Panotti use them as blankets to shield their body against the chills of the night. Their ears were used in lieu of clothing.

The map of the world drawn by Henricus Martellus Germanus in about 1491 describes the "Panotii" as living in southern Asia.

== Other mentions ==
- Pomponius Mela writes that they lived near the Orkney Islands, sharing an island with two other peoples: the Oeonae (who eat only oats and marsh bird eggs) and the Hippopodes (who possess the feet of horses).
- Isidore of Seville also mentions the Panotii.
- They appear in the novel Baudolino by Umberto Eco.
- One of the four narrators in the novel The Habitation of the Blessed by Catherynne M. Valente is a panotii by the name of Imtithal, a storyteller and nanny to three royal children.
- Antonio Pigafetta recorded that the Moluccan pilot of the ship Vittoria told a story about the people of Aracheto. The men and women were 1.5 feet high; their food was the pith of a tree; and they dwells in caverns under ground. Their ears were as long as their bodies; so that, when they lay down, one ear served as a mattress and the other as a blanket.
- A depiction of the Panotti appears on the cover of the self titled album (1996) by the polish avant-folk band Księżyc.

== See also ==
- Pandi (legendary creature)
- Stretching (body piercing)
