= List of Oceanids =

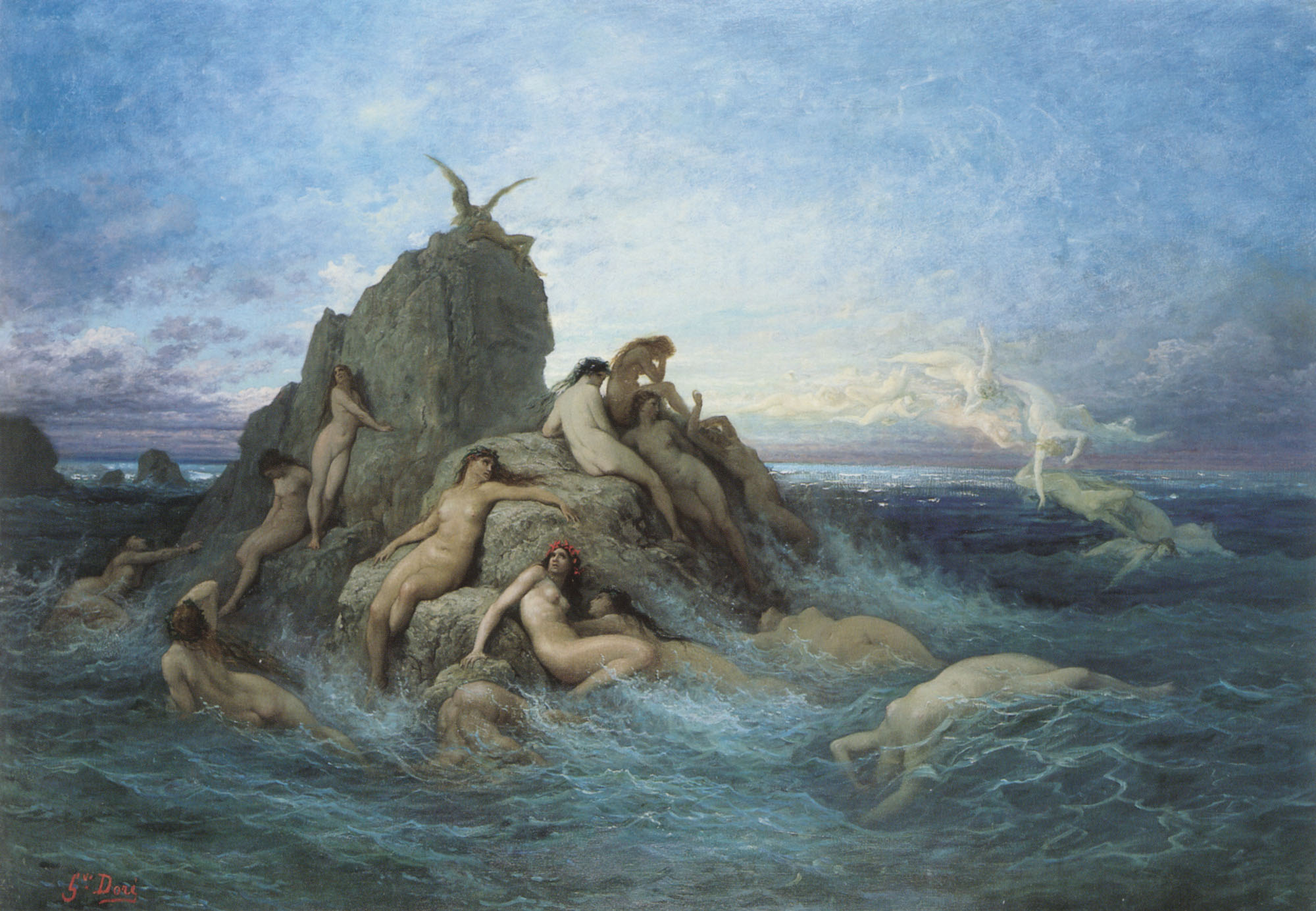
The Oceanids by Gustave Doré (1860)

In Greek mythology, the nymph daughters of the Titan Oceanus (Ocean), were known collectively as the Oceanids. Four ancient sources give lists of names of Oceanids. The oldest, and longest such list, given by the late 8th–early 7th century BC Greek poet Hesiod, names 41 Oceanids. Hesiod goes on to say that these "are the eldest ... but there are many besides" and that there were "three thousand" Oceanids, a number interpreted as meaning "innumerable". While some of these names, such as Peitho, Metis and Tyche, certainly reflected existing traditions, many were probably mere poetic inventions. The probably nearly as old Homeric Hymn to Demeter lists twenty-one names, sixteen of which match those given by Hesiod, and were probably taken directly from there.

The roughly contemporary (? c. 1st century AD) Greek mythographer Apollodorus and the Latin mythographer Hyginus also give lists of Oceanids. Apollodorus gives a list containing seven names, as well as mentioning five other Oceanids elsewhere. Of these twelve names, eight match Hesiod. Hyginus, at the beginning of his Fabulae, lists sixteen names, while elsewhere he gives the names of ten others. Of these 26 names, only nine are found in Hesiod, the Homeric Hymn, or Apollodorus. Many other names are given in other ancient sources.

The names of the Oceanids are of different types. The Oceanids were the nymphs of springs, and some of the names apparently reflect this aquatic connection, with some perhaps being the names of actual springs. Other names have no apparent connection with water. Some, consistent with the Oceanids' function, as specified by Hesiod, of having "youths in their keeping" (i.e. being kourotrophoi), represent things which parents might hope to be bestowed upon their children: Plouto ("Wealth"), Tyche ("Good Fortune"), Idyia ("Knowing"), and Metis ("Wisdom"). Others appear to be geographical eponyms, such as Europa, Asia, Ephyra (Corinth), and Rhodos (Rhodes).

Several of the names given for Oceanids, are also names given for Nereids, the fifty sea nymphs who were the daughters of the sea god Nereus and the Oceanid Doris.

== List ==
Named Oceanids
Name	Sources					Notes
Name	Hes.	Hom. Hymn	Ap.	Hyg.	Other	Notes
Acaste	✓	✓				Only mentioned by name in a single myth
Admete	✓	✓		✓		
Adrasteia				✓		Apollodorus, 1.1.6 makes the nymphs Adrasteia and Ida, the nurses of Zeus, daughters of Melisseus, leader of the Kuretes of Crete
Aethra				✓		
Aetna						
Amalthea				✓		Nurse of Zeus, but not always an Oceanid
Amphirho	✓					
Amphitrite			✓+			The name of a Nereid
Argia				✓+		Mother of Phoroneus, by Inachus, according to Hyginus however according to Apollodorus, the mother of Phoroneus was an Oceanid named Melia.
Asia	✓		✓			The name of a Nereid
Asterodia						
Asterope						
Beroe						The name of a Nereid
Callirhoe	✓	✓	✓			
Calypso	✓	✓				The name of a Nereid; "probably not" the same as the Calypso who was the lover of Odysseus
Camarina						
Capheira						
Cerceis	✓					
Ceto						The name of a Nereid
Chryseis	✓	✓				
Clio						The name of a Nereid and a muse.
Clitemneste				✓		
Clymene	✓			✓		The name of a Nereid
Clytie	✓			✓		
Coryphe						
Daeira						
Dione	✓					The name of a Nereid
Dodone						
Doris	✓		✓			The name of a Nereid
Electra	✓	✓	✓			
Ephyra				✓		The name of a Nereid
Euagoreis				✓		
Eudora	✓					The name of a Nereid and one of the Hyades
Europa	✓					
Eurynome	✓		✓+	✓		
Galaxaura	✓	✓				
Hesione						
Hestyaea				✓		
Hippo	✓					
Iache		✓				
Ianeira	✓	✓				The name of a Nereid
Ianthe	✓	✓		✓		
Ida				✓		Apollodorus, 1.1.6 makes the nymphs Adrasteia and Ida, the nurses of Zeus, daughters of Melisseus, leader of the Kuretes of Crete
Idyia or Eidyia	✓		✓			
Leucippe		✓				
Libye						
Lyris				✓		
Lysithoe						Mother of Heracles by Zeus in some myths.
Melia (consort of Apollo)						See also (below) the Argive Oceanid Melia who was the consort of Inachus
Melia (consort of Inachus)			✓			Mother of Phoroneus by Inachus, according to Apollodorus, however, according to Hyginus, the mother of Phoroneus was Argia. See also (above) the Theban Oceanid Melia who was the consort of Apollo
Meliboea			✓			
Melite		✓		✓		The name of a Nereid
Melobosis	✓	✓				
Menestho	✓					
Menippe				✓		
Mentis				✓		
Merope				✓		
Metis	✓		✓			
Mopsopia						
Neaera						
Nemesis						A daughter of Nyx according to Hesiod and Hyginus
Nychea						
Ocyrhoe	✓	✓				
Pasiphae				✓		
Pasithoe	✓					
Peitho	✓					
Periboea						
Perse or Perseis	✓+			✓		
Petraea	✓					
Phaeno		✓				
Philyra				✓		
Pleione			✓	✓		
Plexaura	✓					The name of a Nereid
Plouto or Pluto	✓	✓				
Polydora	✓					
Polyphe						
Polyxo				✓		
Prymno	✓					
Rhodea, Rhodeia, or Rhodia	✓	✓				
Rhodope		✓		✓		
Rhodos or Rhode						A daughter of Poseidon and Aphrodite
The Sirens						Usually the daughters of Achelous and Melpomene
Stilbo				✓		
Styx	✓	✓	✓			According to Hyginus a daughter of Nyx
Telesto	✓					
Theia						Mother of the Cercopes
Thoe	✓					The name of a Nereid
Thraike						
Tyche	✓	✓				
Urania	✓	✓				
Xanthe	✓					The name of a Nereid
Zeuxo	✓					

== See also ==
- List of Greek deities
