= Amphirho =

One of the Oceanids in Greek mythology

In Greek mythology, Amphirho (Ancient Greek: Ἀμφιρὼ or Αμφιρω Amphirô) was an Oceanid, one of the 3,000 daughters of the Titans of the sea, Oceanus and Tethys. Amphirho had also the same parentage with that of the river-gods. Her name may probably mean "surrounding-river" from amphi and rhoos.

== Mythology ==
Amphirho only appeared in the list of Oceanids according to Hesiod's Theogony:

Also she brought forth a holy company of daughters who with the lord Apollo and the Rivers have youths in their keeping—to this charge Zeus appointed them—Peitho, and Admete, and Ianthe, and Electra, and Doris, and Prymno, and Urania divine in form, Hippo, Clymene, Rhodea, and Callirrhoe, Zeuxo and Clytie, and Idyia, and Pasithoe, Plexaura, and Galaxaura, and lovely Dione, Melobosis and Thoe and handsome Polydora, Cerceis lovely of form, and soft eyed Pluto, Perseis, Ianeira, Acaste, Xanthe, Petraea the fair, Menestho, and Europa, Metis, and Eurynome, and Telesto saffron-clad, Chryseis and Asia and charming Calypso, Eudora, and Tyche, Amphirho, and Ocyrrhoe, and Styx who is the chiefest of them all. These are the eldest daughters that sprang from Ocean and Tethys; but there are many besides. For there are three thousand neat-ankled daughters of Ocean who are dispersed far and wide, and in every place alike serve the earth and the deep waters, children who are glorious among goddesses.
