= Admete (disambiguation) =

Admete was a Mycenaean princess in Greek mythology.

Admete may also refer to:

- Admete (mythology)
- Admete (gastropod), a gastropod of the family Cancellariidae
- 398 Admete, a main belt asteroid
