= 820 Adriana =

Main-belt asteroid

Discovery
- Discovered by: M. Wolf
- Discovery site: Heidelberg Obs.
- Discovery date: 30 March 1916

Designations
- Named after: unknown
- Alternative designations: 1916 ZB · 1934 NA_{1} 1934 PV · 1935 SE; 1975 YP
- Minor planet category: main-belt

Orbital characteristics
- Epoch 31 July 2016 (JD 2457600.5)
- Uncertainty parameter 0
- Observation arc: 80.57 yr (29427 d)
- Aphelion: 3.2848 AU (491.40 Gm)
- Perihelion: 2.9746 AU (444.99 Gm)
- Semi-major axis: 3.1297 AU (468.20 Gm)
- Eccentricity: 0.049550
- Orbital period (sidereal): 5.54 yr (2022.3 d)
- Mean anomaly: 284.54°
- Mean motion: 0° 10^{m} 40.836^{s} / day
- Inclination: 5.9337°
- Longitude of ascending node: 118.47°
- Argument of perihelion: 193.08°
- Earth MOID: 1.95997 AU (293.207 Gm)
- Jupiter MOID: 1.8749 AU (280.48 Gm)
- T_{Jupiter}: 3.203

Physical characteristics
- Mean radius: 29.325±1.25 km (IRAS:26)
- Geometric albedo: 0.0204±0.002 (IRAS:26)
- Absolute magnitude (H): 10.4

820 Adriana, provisional designation 1916 ZB, is an exceptionally dark asteroid from the outer region of the asteroid belt, about 59 kilometers in diameter. It was discovered by German astronomer Max Wolf at Heidelberg Observatory in southern Germany, on 30 March 1916.

The asteroid orbits the Sun at a distance of 3.0–3.3 AU once every 5 years and 7 months (2,027 days). Its orbit shows an eccentricity of 0.05 and is tilted by 6 degrees to the plane of the ecliptic. According to the survey carried out by the Infrared Astronomical Satellite, IRAS, the asteroid's surface has an extremely low albedo of 0.02. The body's spectral type remains unknown, as does its rotation period.

This is the lowest-numbered minor planet with an undetermined rotation period. By 2014, there were only 22 asteroids with an unknown rotation period for the low-numbered asteroids up to number 1000 (also see 398 Admete and 457 Alleghenia). Any reference of this name to a person or occurrence is unknown.

== See also ==
- 398 Admete
- 457 Alleghenia
- 835 Olivia
- 848 Inna
- 1053 Vigdis
- 1193 Africa
- 1221 Amor
