= Admete (mythology) =

Set of mythological Greek characters

In Greek mythology, Admete (/ædˈmiːti/; Ancient Greek: Ἀδμήτη, lit. 'the unbroken', 'unwedded' or 'untamed') is a name attributed two different figures:

- Admete (Oceanid), a companion of Persephone.
- Admete (or Admeta), daughter of Eurystheus.
