= Iphimedon =

In Greek mythology, Iphimedon (Ancient Greek: Ἰφιμέδων, romanized: Iphimedōn, lit. 'ruling with might' or 'strong guardian') was a prince of Tiryns as son of King Eurystheus.

== Family ==
Iphimedon's mother was Antimache, daughter of Prince Amphidamas of Arcadia. He was the brother of Admete, Alexander, Eurybius, Mentor and Perimedes.

== Mythology ==
Iphimedon was killed in battle by the Athenians along with his brothers in the war that ensued when Athens refused to deliver the Heracleidae up to Eurystheus.
