= Perimedes =

Name of several characters in Greek mythology

Perimedes (Ancient Greek: Περιμήδης, lit. 'very cunning', 'ruling all around' or 'cunning all-around') was a name attributed to several characters in Greek mythology.

- Perimedes, the Centaur son of Peuceus and brother of Dryalus. He attended Pirithous’ and Hippodameia’s wedding, and together with his kind, they fought against the Lapiths during the celebrated Centauromachy.
- Perimedes, a prince of Tiryns as son of King Eurystheus and Antimache, daughter of Amphidamas of Arcadia. He was the brother of Admete, Alexander, Iphimedon, Mentor and Eurybius. Perimedes was killed by the Athenians in the war that ensued when Athens refused to deliver the Heraclidae up to Eurystheus. Alternately, Perimedes, along with his brothers Eurybius and Eurypylus, was slain by Heracles when at a sacrificial meal in honor of his Twelve Labors being completed they served him a smaller portion of meat than they did for themselves.
- Perimedes, father of the Phocian Schedius who participated in the Trojan War.
- Perimedes, a defender of Troy from Smintheus's grove who was killed by Neoptolemus.
- Perimedes, a singer from Argos, said to have had many disciples.
- Perimedes, one of Odysseus's companions during his return voyage from Troy according to the Odyssey. He is very loyal to Odysseus throughout the story.
- Perimedes, one of the Suitors of Penelope who came from Same along with other 22 wooers. He, with the other suitors, was killed by Odysseus with the aid of Eumaeus, Philoetius, and Telemachus.
