= Zeuxo =

Zeuxo may refer to:

- Zeuxo (mythology), a nymph in Greek mythology
- 438 Zeuxo, a large Main belt asteroid discovered in 1898
- Zeuxo (crustacean), a genus in family Tanaididae
