= Telesto =

Telesto may refer to:

- Telesto (mythology), a figure in Greek mythology
- Telesto (moon), moon of Saturn
- Telesto (coral), genus of Octocorallia
