= Adriana (disambiguation) =

Adriana is a feminine given name. It may also refer to:

== People ==
- Adriana (footballer, born 1968), Brazilian former footballer
- Adriana (footballer, born 1996), Brazilian footballer
- Adriana Martín (born 1986), Spanish footballer commonly known as Adriana
- Beatriz Adriana (born 1958), Mexican singer
- Bèto Adriana (1925–1997), multi-sport athlete who represented the Netherlands Antilles at the Olympics
- Sharnol Adriana (born 1970), Curaçaoan-Dutch baseball player and coach

== Other uses ==
- 820 Adriana, an asteroid
- Adriana (plant), a plant genus in the family Euphorbiaceae
- Adriana (ship), any one of several vessels named Adriana
- Adriana (TV series), a Mexican telenovela
