= Menestho (disambiguation) =

Menestho is a genus of snail.

Menestho (Μενεσθώ) may also refer to:

- Menestho (mythology), one of the Oceanides
- Menestho, one of the sacrificial victims of Minotaur
