= Mentor (mythology) =

Greek mythological characters

In Greek mythology, Mentor (Ancient Greek: Μέντωρ, gen.: Μέντορος, romanized: Méntōr or Méntor, lit. 'adviser', 'mind' or 'spirit') was attributed to the following characters:

- Mentor, the Thespian son of Heracles and Asopis, daughter of King Thespius of Thespiae. Mentor and his 49 half-brothers were born of Thespius' daughters who were impregnated by Heracles in one night, for a week or in the course of 50 days while hunting for the Cithaeronian lion. Later on, the hero sent a message to Thespius to keep seven of these sons and send three of them in Thebes while the remaining forty, joined by Iolaus, were dispatched to the island of Sardinia to found a colony.
- Mentor, a prince of Tiryns as son of King Eurystheus and Antimache, daughter of Amphidamas of Arcadia. He was the brother of Admete, Alexander, Iphimedon, Eurybius and Perimedes. Mentor was killed in battle by the Athenians along with his brothers in the war that ensued when Athens refused to deliver the Heraclidae up to Eurystheus. Eurypylus, who was slain by Heracles, may also be one his brothers.
- Mentor (Odyssey), son of Alcimus, friend of Odysseus and tutor of Telemachus in the Odyssey.
- Mentor, a man who was rich in horse at Pedaeus. He was the father of the spearman Imbrius, an ally of the Trojans.
