= Antimache =

Wife of Eurystheus in Greek mythology

In Greek mythology, Antimache (Ancient Greek: Ἀντιμάχη, lit. 'against battle' or 'anti-war') was the queen of Tiryns as wife of King Eurystheus, who tasked Heracles with his Labors.

== Mythology ==
Antimache was of Arcadian descent as the daughter of Amphidamas and the sister of Melanion, husband of the heroine Atalanta. Together with her husband Eurystheus, Antimache bore the following children: Admete, Alexander, Iphimedon, Eurybius, Mentor, Perimedes, and possibly, Eurypylus. All of her sons were killed in battle by the Athenians in the war that ensued when Athens refused to deliver the Heracleidae up to Eurystheus. Alternatively, during a sacrificial meal in honor of his Twelve Labors being completed, Heracles himself slain Antimache's children: Eurybius, Perimedes and Eurypylus when they served him a smaller portion of meat than they did for themselves.
