= Adriana (ship) =

Several vessels have been named Adriana.

- Adriana (1792 ship), of 289 tons (bm), was launched at Philadelphia in 1792. She first appeared in Lloyd's Register (LR) in 1792, with US ownership and trade Britain–Philadelphia. From 1798 she became a Liverpool-based slave ship in the triangular trade in enslaved people. She made two complete enslaving voyages. Lloyd's List reported in 1800 that "the French squadron" had captured Adriana, and her entry in the Register of Shipping for 1800 carried the annotation "Captured", but the Trans Atlantic Slave Trade database made no mention of the capture and showed her completing her voyage. Then in 1804 a French privateer captured Adriana as Adriana and her cargo of captives were on their way from the African coast to the British West Indies. Her captor took Adriana and all aboard to Guadeloupe.
- Adriana, of 42232/95 tons (bm), was a vessel constructed in Baltimore in 1798. The citizens of Baltimore purchased her in 1798 and donated her to the United States Navy, which renamed her USS Baltimore. She was sold in 1801.
- Adriana, of 300 tons (bm), was launched in 1804 at New York City. She was one of 24 vessels sunk in 1814 in Baltimore harbour to block the harbour from British attack. In 1837 the US Government paid her owners $5,733.40 in compensation for the loss of their vessel.
- HSC Adriana was launched in 1992 at Singapore as Perdana Express. She is a high speed catamaran owned since 1998 by a Croatian shipping company, which renamed her Adriana. She has a capacity of 325 passengers.
- MS Adriana was launched in 1972 at Perama as Acquarius. In 1987, the new owners renamed her Adriana. She was a mid-sized cruise ship that was scrapped in 2019.
- Adriana capsized in the 2023 Pylos migrant boat disaster.
