= 457 Alleghenia =

Carbonaceous asteroid

Discovery
- Discovered by: M. Wolf; F. Schwassmann
- Discovery site: Heidelberg Obs.
- Discovery date: 15 September 1900; 125 years ago

Designations
- Pronunciation: /æləˈɡeɪniə/
- Named after: Allegheny, Pennsylvania (John Brashear optics)
- Alternative designations: 1900 FJ · 1938 SA
- Minor planet category: main-belt · (outer)

Orbital characteristics
- Epoch 31 July 2016 (JD 2457600.5)
- Uncertainty parameter 0
- Observation arc: 115.57 yr (42213 d)
- Aphelion: 3.6339 AU (543.62 Gm)
- Perihelion: 2.5553 AU (382.27 Gm)
- Semi-major axis: 3.0946 AU (462.95 Gm)
- Eccentricity: 0.17427
- Orbital period (sidereal): 5.44 yr (1988.4 d)
- Mean anomaly: 104.03°
- Mean motion: 0° 10^{m} 51.78^{s} / day
- Inclination: 12.919°
- Longitude of ascending node: 249.70°
- Argument of perihelion: 128.67°
- Earth MOID: 1.58071 AU (236.471 Gm)
- Jupiter MOID: 1.92316 AU (287.701 Gm)
- T_{Jupiter}: 3.162

Physical characteristics
- Dimensions: 33.54 km (calculated)
- Synodic rotation period: 21.953±0.001 h 21.953 h (0.9147 d)
- Geometric albedo: 0.057 (assumed)
- Spectral type: C
- Absolute magnitude (H): 11.1

457 Alleghenia, provisional designation 1900 FJ, is a carbonaceous asteroid from the outer region of the asteroid belt, about 34 kilometers in diameter. It was discovered on 15 September 1900, by German astronomers Max Wolf and Friedrich Schwassmann at Heidelberg Observatory in southern Germany.

The C-type asteroid orbits the Sun at a distance of 2.6–3.6 AU once every 5 years and 5 months (1,987 days). Its orbit is tilted by 13 degrees to the plane of the ecliptic and shows an eccentricity of 0.17. Based on assumptions made by the Collaborative Asteroid Lightcurve Link, the body has a low albedo of 0.06, a typical value for a carbonaceous asteroid. In 2014, photometric light-curve observations at the Los Algarrobos Observatory (OLASU, I38), Uruguay, has given a rotation period of 21.953±0.001 hours with a brightness amplitude of 0.20 in magnitude. It was the last among the first 500 numbered asteroids to have its period measured for the first time (also see 398 Admete).

The minor planet was named by Max Wolf in honor and gratitude of U.S. optician John Brashear at Allegheny in Pennsylvania, who equipped Wolf's new telescope with state of the art optics (lenses for the 16-inch photographic doublet). Some of the finest astronomy equipment of the early 20th century were produced at Allegheny by Brashear. The body was the first discovery Wolf made with his new instrument. (Note: Original citation by Max Wolf (in German) in 1901 (AN 154, 443): Dem ersten mit meinem neuen Fernrohr entdeckten kleinen Planeten habe ich in meiner Freude über die ausgezeichneten Linsen, die mir mein Freund Brashear in Allegheny dazu geschliffen hat, den Namen Alleghenia gegeben. Dictionary of Minor Planet Names Reference Work Entry for – (457) Alleghenia) Wolf also expressed his gratitude by granting the naming of another of his discoveries to the American optician, who named it 484 Pittsburghia, after his home city. Brashear is also honored by a Martian and a lunar crater. The minor planet 5502 Brashear was later directly named after the famous American astronomer and instrument builder.

== See also ==
- Allegheny Observatory
