= 398 Admete =

Main-belt asteroid

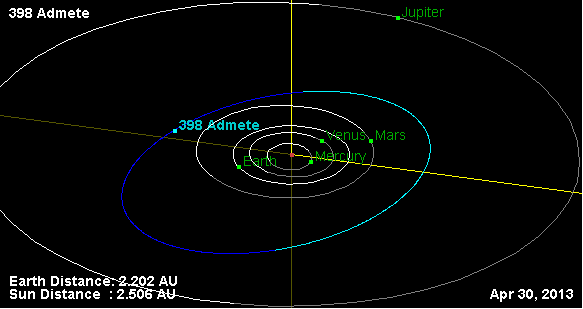
- Orbital diagram

Discovery
- Discovered by: A. Charlois
- Discovery site: Nice Observatory
- Discovery date: 28 December 1894

Designations
- Pronunciation: /ædˈmiːtiː/
- Named after: Admete (Greek mythology)
- Alternative designations: 1894 BN · 1951 LP; 1952 QC_{1} · A907 RE
- Minor planet category: main-belt · (outer)

Orbital characteristics
- Epoch 31 July 2016 (JD 2457600.5)
- Uncertainty parameter 0
- Observation arc: 120.95 yr (44176 d)
- Aphelion: 3.3515 AU (501.38 Gm)
- Perihelion: 2.1269 AU (318.18 Gm)
- Semi-major axis: 2.7392 AU (409.78 Gm)
- Eccentricity: 0.22354
- Orbital period (sidereal): 4.53 yr (1655.9 d)
- Mean anomaly: 314.19°
- Mean motion: 0° 13^{m} 2.64^{s} / day
- Inclination: 9.5259°
- Longitude of ascending node: 279.98°
- Argument of perihelion: 159.02°
- Earth MOID: 1.144 AU (171.1 Gm)
- Jupiter MOID: 1.91915 AU (287.101 Gm)
- T_{Jupiter}: 3.294

Physical characteristics
- Dimensions: 46.98±2.3 km (IRAS:6); 46.93 km (derived)
- Synodic rotation period: 11.208 h (0.4670 d); 11.208±0.001 h
- Geometric albedo: 0.0607±0.006 (IRAS:6); 0.0555 (derived)
- Spectral type: SMASS = C C
- Absolute magnitude (H): 10.4

398 Admete, provisional designation 1894 BN, is a dark, carbonaceous asteroid from the outer region of the asteroid belt, about 47 kilometers in diameter. It was discovered on 28 December 1894, by French astronomer Auguste Charlois at Nice Observatory in south-eastern France.

The dark C-type asteroid orbits the Sun at a distance of 2.1–3.4 AU once every four years and six months (1,656 days). Its orbit shows an eccentricity of 0.22, and it is tilted by ten degrees to the plane of the ecliptic. The body's surface has a low albedo of 0.06, a typical value for carbonaceous asteroids.

It had been titled the lowest numbered asteroid with no previously known period until its opposition in 2014, when a photometric light-curve analysis was performed at the Uruguayan Los Algarrobos Observatory (OLASU, I38); this rendered a rotation period of 11.208±0.001 hours with a brightness amplitude of 0.13±0.02 in magnitude. Later in 2014, Eduardo Alvarez at OLASU determined the period of the next lowest numbered asteroid with no previously known period, 457 Alleghenia. Since then, all asteroids numbered up to 500 have had their rotation period determined. As of 2014, there remain 22 asteroids (numbered up to 1000) with no known period.

The minor planet was named from Greek mythology for Admete, daughter of king Eurystheus, who appointed the Twelve Labors of Heracles, after whom the minor planet 5143 Heracles is named. One of the labors was to obtain the golden girdle of Hippolyta, which was coveted by Admete.
