= Stilbo =

Stilbo may refer to:

- Stilbo, one among a number of Oceanids mentioned in Hyginus' Fabulae
- Stilpo (c. 360 – c. 280 BCE), Megarian philosopher, teacher of Pyrrho and Zeno of Citium

== See also ==
- Stilbe, name of several figures in Greek mythology
