= Eurystheus =

King of Tiryns in Greek mythology

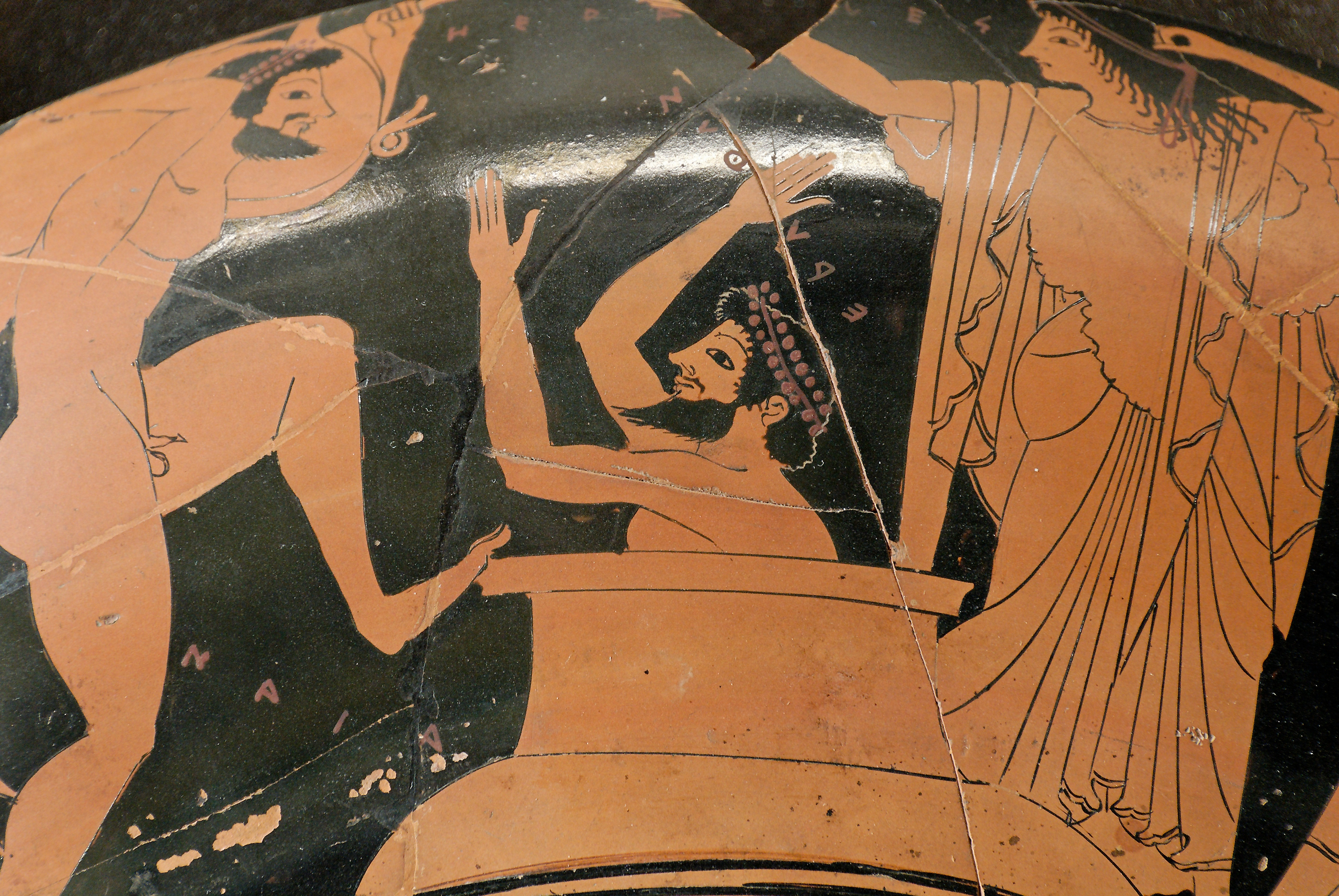
Eurystheus hiding in a storage jar as Heracles brings him the Erymanthian boar. Side A from a red-figure kylix by Oltos, ca. 510 BC, (Louvre).

In Greek mythology, Eurystheus (/jʊəˈrɪsθiəs/; Ancient Greek: Εὐρυσθεύς, lit. 'broad strength', IPA: [eu̯rystʰěu̯s]) was king of Tiryns, one of three Mycenaean strongholds in the Argolid, although other authors including Homer and Euripides cast him as ruler of Argos.

== Family ==
Eurystheus was the son of King Sthenelus and Nicippe (also called Antibia or Archippe), and he was a grandson of the hero Perseus. His sisters were Alcyone and Medusa (Astymedusa).

Eurystheus married Antimache, daughter of Amphidamas of Arcadia. Their children were Admete, Alexander, Eurybius, Mentor, Perimedes, Iphimedon, and Eurypylus.

== Mythology ==
=== Labours of Heracles ===
In the contest of wills between Hera and Zeus over whose candidate would be hero, fated to defeat the remaining creatures representing an old order and bring about the reign of the Twelve Olympians, Eurystheus was Hera's candidate and Heracles—though his name implies that at one archaic stage of myth-making he had carried "Hera's fame"—was the candidate of Zeus. The arena for the actions that would bring about this deep change are the Twelve Labors imposed on Heracles by Eurystheus. The immediate necessity for the Labours of Heracles is as penance for Heracles' murder of his own family, in a fit of madness, which had been sent by Hera; however, further human rather than mythic motivation is supplied by mythographers who note that their respective families had been rivals for the throne of Mycenae. Details of the individual episodes may be found in the article on the Labours of Heracles, but Hera was connected to all of the opponents Heracles had to overcome.

Heracles' human stepfather Amphitryon was also a grandson of Perseus, and since Amphitryon's father (Alcaeus) was older than Eurystheus' father (Sthenelus), he might have received the kingdom, but Sthenelus had banished Amphitryon for accidentally killing (a familiar mytheme) the eldest son in the family (Electryon). When, shortly before his son Heracles was born, Zeus proclaimed the next-born descendant of Perseus should get the kingdom, Hera thwarted his ambitions by delaying Alcmene's labour and having her candidate Eurystheus born prematurely at seven months. Heracles' first task was to slay the Nemean Lion and bring back its skin, which Heracles decided to wear. Eurystheus was so scared by Heracles' fearsome guise that he hid in a subterranean bronze winejar, and from that moment forth all labors were communicated to Heracles through a herald, Copreus.

For his second labour, to slay the Lernaean Hydra, Heracles took with him his nephew, Iolaus, as a charioteer. When Eurystheus found out that Heracles' nephew had helped him he declared that the labour had not been completed alone and as a result did not count towards the ten labours set for him.

Eurystheus' third task did not involve killing a beast, but capturing one alive—the Ceryneian Hind, a golden-horned hind or doe sacred to Artemis. Heracles knew that he had to return the hind, as he had promised, to Artemis, so he agreed to hand it over on the condition that Eurystheus himself come out and take it from him. Eurystheus did come out, but the moment Heracles let the hind go, she sprinted back to her mistress, and Heracles departed, saying that Eurystheus had not been quick enough.

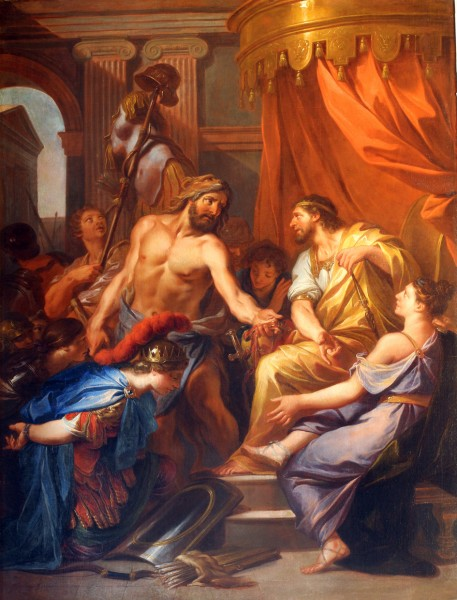
Hercule apporte à Eurysthée la ceinture de la reine des Amazones by Daniel Sarrabat.

When Heracles returned with the Erymanthian Boar, Eurystheus was again frightened and hid in his jar, begging Heracles to get rid of the beast; Heracles obliged.

The fifth labour proposed by Eurystheus was to clear out the numerous stables of Augeias. Striking a deal with Augeias, Heracles proposed a payment of a tenth of Augeias' cattle if the labour was completed successfully. Not believing the task feasible, Augeias agreed, asking his son Phyleus to witness. Heracles rerouted two nearby rivers (Alpheis and Peneios) through the stable, clearing out the dung rapidly. When Augeias learned of Heracles' bargain for the task, he refused payment. Heracles brought the case to court, and Phyleus testified against his father. Enraged, Augeias banished both Phyleus and Heracles from the land before the court had cast their vote. However, Eurystheus refused to credit the labour to Heracles, as he had performed it for payment. So Heracles went and drove Augeias out of the kingdom and installed Phyleus as king. Heracles then took his tenth of the cattle and left them to graze in a field by his home.

For his sixth labour, Heracles had to drive the Stymphalian Birds off the marshes they plagued. He did so, shooting down several birds with his Hydra-poisoned arrows and bringing them back to Eurystheus as proof.

For his seventh labour, Heracles captured the Cretan Bull. He used a lasso and rode it back to his cousin. Eurystheus offered to sacrifice the bull to Hera his patron, who hated Heracles. She refused the sacrifice because it reflected glory on Heracles. The bull was released and wandered to Marathon, becoming known as the Marathonian Bull.

When Heracles brought back the man-eating Mares of Diomedes successfully, Eurystheus dedicated the horses to Hera and allowed them to roam freely in the Argolid. Bucephalus, Alexander the Great's horse, was said to be descended from these mares.

To acquire the belt of Hippolyte, queen of the Amazons, was Heracles' ninth task. This task was at the request of Eurystheus' daughter, Admete. For the tenth labour, he stole the cattle of the giant Geryon, which Eurystheus then sacrificed to Hera.

To extend what may have once been ten Labours to the canonical dozen, it was said that Eurystheus didn't count the Hydra, as he was assisted, nor the Augean stables, as Heracles received payment for his work. For the eleventh labour, Heracles had to obtain the Apples of the Hesperides; he convinced their father, the Titan Atlas, to help him, but did his share of work by temporarily holding up the sky in the Titan's stead. For his final labour, he was to capture Cerberus, the three-headed hound that guarded the entrance to Hades. When he managed to bring the struggling animal back, the terrified Eurystheus hid in his jar one more time, begging Heracles to leave for good and take the dog with him.

=== Death ===
After Heracles died, Eurystheus remained bitter over the indignity the hero had caused him. He attempted to destroy Heracles' many children (the Heracleidae, led by Hyllus), who fled to Athens. He attacked the city but was soundly defeated, and Eurystheus and his sons were killed. Though it is widely told that Hyllus killed Eurystheus, the stories about the killer of Eurystheus and the fate of his corpse vary, but the Athenians believed the burial site of Eurystheus remained on their soil and served to protect the country against the descendants of Heracles, who traditionally included the Spartans and Argives.

After Eurystheus' death, the brothers Atreus and Thyestes, whom he had left in charge during his absence, took over the city, the former exiling the latter and assuming the kingship, while Tiryns returned to the kingship of Argos.

== Eurystheus in Euripides ==
Eurystheus was a character in Heracleidae, a play by Euripides. Macaria, one of the daughters of Heracles, and her brothers and sisters hid from Eurystheus in Athens, which was ruled by King Demophon. As Eurystheus prepared to attack, an oracle told Demophon that he would win if and only if a noble woman was sacrificed to Persephone. Macaria volunteered for the sacrifice and a spring was named the Macarian spring in her honor. Eurystheus speaks prophetically of his burial within Attica, claiming that he will be an anti-hero of sorts, though one who will eventually protect the Athenians.

== In popular culture ==
- Eurystheus appears in the 1958 film Hercules and is portrayed by Italian actor Arturo Dominici. In contrast to the character's mythology, the Eurystheus depicted in the film is only a supporting character seen as a criminal recruited to kill King Aeson of Iolcus. During the film's climax, he is confronted and strangled to death by Hercules' chain lasso.
- Eurystheus appears in the 1960 film Goliath and the Dragon, portrayed by Broderick Crawford. In this second known film appearance, he is depicted as a warlord set on conquering Thebes and becoming its new king. He sets Hercules on a dangerous mission (reminiscent of the Twelfth Labor of Hercules), believing the hero will perish and leave Thebes defenseless without its champion. Eurystheus is later killed in a dungeon scene with Hercules after being pushed by a slave girl into an open pit of snakes.
- Eurystheus appears as the secondary antagonist in the 2014 film Hercules, portrayed by Joseph Fiennes. Here, Eurystheus (depicted as King of Athens in 361 BC, when the city was actually a democracy) is responsible for the death of Hercules' family, rather than Hercules under Hera's spell, having drugged Hercules and sent three black wolves to attack him. The wolves killed Hercules' family, though Hercules believed that it was he who killed his own family. Hercules avenges his family by stabbing Eurystheus to death with his own dagger.

== Notes ==
Regnal titles
Preceded by Sthenelus	King of Mycenae	Succeeded by Atreus
