= 1053 Vigdis =

Main-belt asteroid

Discovery
- Discovered by: M. F. Wolf
- Discovery site: Heidelberg Obs.
- Discovery date: 16 November 1925

Designations
- Named after: unknown
- Alternative designations: 1925 WA · 1929 RM
- Minor planet category: main-belt · (middle) background

Orbital characteristics
- Epoch 23 March 2018 (JD 2458200.5)
- Uncertainty parameter 0
- Observation arc: 91.55 yr (33,439 d)
- Aphelion: 2.8669 AU
- Perihelion: 2.3616 AU
- Semi-major axis: 2.6143 AU
- Eccentricity: 0.0966
- Orbital period (sidereal): 4.23 yr (1,544 d)
- Mean anomaly: 280.15°
- Mean motion: 0° 13^{m} 59.52^{s} / day
- Inclination: 8.3407°
- Longitude of ascending node: 17.590°
- Argument of perihelion: 42.538°

Physical characteristics
- Mean diameter: 9.110±1.041 km
- Geometric albedo: 0.389±0.269
- Absolute magnitude (H): 12.2

1053 Vigdis, provisional designation 1925 WA, is a bright background asteroid from the central regions of the asteroid belt, approximately 9 kilometers (5.6 miles) in diameter. It was discovered on 16 November 1925, by German astronomer Max Wolf at the Heidelberg-Königstuhl State Observatory in Heidelberg, Germany. The meaning of the asteroids's name is unknown.

== Orbit and classification ==
Vigdis is a non-family asteroid of the main belt's background population. It orbits the Sun in the central asteroid belt at a distance of 2.4–2.9 AU once every 4 years and 3 months (1,544 days; semi-major axis of 2.61 AU). Its orbit has an eccentricity of 0.10 and an inclination of 8° with respect to the ecliptic. The asteroid was first observed at Algiers Observatory on 15 November 1925. The body's observation arc begins at Heidelberg with its official discovery observation the following night.

== Physical characteristics ==
According to the survey carried out by the NEOWISE mission of NASA's Wide-field Infrared Survey Explorer, Vigdis measures 9.110 kilometers in diameter and its surface has an albedo of 0.389. As of 2018, no rotational lightcurve of Vigdis has been obtained from photometric observations. The body's rotation period, pole and shape remain unknown.

== Naming ==
Any reference of this minor planet's name to a person or occurrence is unknown. "Vigdis" is an antiquated female first name used in Scandinavia and Iceland.

=== Unknown meaning ===
Among the many thousands of named minor planets, Vigdis is one of 120 asteroids for which no official naming citation has been published. All of these asteroids have low numbers between 164 Eva and 1514 Ricouxa and were discovered between 1876 and the 1930s, predominantly by astronomers Auguste Charlois, Johann Palisa, Max Wolf and Karl Reinmuth.
