= Imbrius =

Defender of Troy in Greek mythology

In Greek mythology, Imbrius (Ancient Greek: Ἴμβριος, romanized: Ímbrios, "Imbrian"), son of Mentor (who was rich in horses), was a defender of Troy. According to the Iliad, Imbrius originated from Pedaeum (Pedaeus) and was married to Medesicaste, an illegitimate daughter of King Priam. When the Greeks landed at Troy, Imbrius moved to the house of his father-in-law, who treated him like his own son. Imbrius fought at the walls of Troy and was killed by Teucer.

Imbrius also occurs as a surname of Eetion.
