= 438 Zeuxo =

Main-belt asteroid

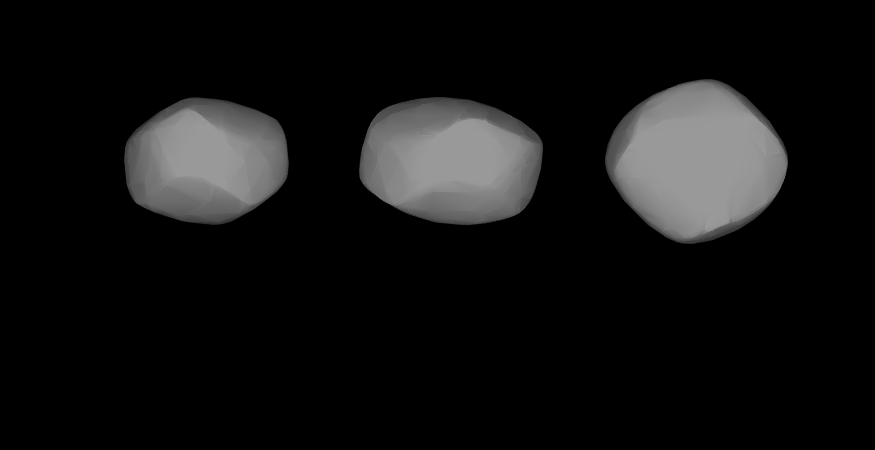
- Lightcurve-base 3D-model of 438 Zeuxo.

Discovery
- Discovered by: Auguste Charlois
- Discovery date: 8 November 1898

Designations
- Pronunciation: /ˈzjuːksoʊ/
- Named after: Ζευξώ Zeyxō
- Alternative designations: 1898 DU
- Minor planet category: Main belt
- Adjectives: Zeuxoian /zjuːkˈsoʊ.iən/

Orbital characteristics
- Epoch 31 July 2016 (JD 2457600.5)
- Uncertainty parameter 0
- Observation arc: 117.43 yr (42893 d)
- Aphelion: 2.72775 AU (408.066 Gm)
- Perihelion: 2.38099 AU (356.191 Gm)
- Semi-major axis: 2.55437 AU (382.128 Gm)
- Eccentricity: 0.067876
- Orbital period (sidereal): 4.08 yr (1491.2 d)
- Mean anomaly: 83.4825°
- Mean motion: 0° 14^{m} 29.119^{s} / day
- Inclination: 7.37183°
- Longitude of ascending node: 49.1436°
- Argument of perihelion: 211.380°

Physical characteristics
- Dimensions: 61.14±3.9 km
- Synodic rotation period: 8.831 h (0.3680 d)
- Geometric albedo: 0.0568±0.008
- Absolute magnitude (H): 9.80

438 Zeuxo is a large Main belt asteroid.

It was discovered by Auguste Charlois on 8 November 1898 in Nice and was named after the Oceanid Zeuxo.
