= 835 Olivia =

Outer main-belt asteroid

Discovery
- Discovered by: M. F. Wolf
- Discovery site: Heidelberg Obs.
- Discovery date: 23 September 1967

Designations
- Named after: unknown
- Alternative designations: A916 SH · 1964 BA; 1979 ST · 1916 AE
- Minor planet category: main-belt · (outer) background

Orbital characteristics
- Epoch 31 May 2020 (JD 2459000.5)
- Uncertainty parameter 0
- Observation arc: 103.29 yr (37,725 d)
- Aphelion: 3.5001 AU
- Perihelion: 2.9366 AU
- Semi-major axis: 3.2183 AU
- Eccentricity: 0.0875
- Orbital period (sidereal): 5.77 yr (2,109 d)
- Mean anomaly: 1.9258°
- Mean motion: 0° 10^{m} 14.52^{s} / day
- Inclination: 3.6998°
- Longitude of ascending node: 308.48°
- Argument of perihelion: 66.972°

Physical characteristics
- Mean diameter: 30.418±0.082 km; 35.65±2.3 km; 36.05±0.91 km
- Synodic rotation period: undetermined
- Geometric albedo: 0.0242±0.004; 0.025±0.001; 0.033±0.006
- Spectral type: C (SDSS-MOC)
- Absolute magnitude (H): 11.5

835 Olivia (prov. designation: A916 SH or 1916 AE) is a dark background asteroid from the outer regions of the asteroid belt. It was discovered by German astronomer Max Wolf at the Heidelberg-Königstuhl State Observatory on 23 September 1916. The carbonaceous C-type asteroid measures approximately 35 kilometers (22 miles) in diameter, and is one of few low-numbered asteroids with an undetermined rotation period. Any reference to the origin of the asteroid's name is unknown.

== Orbit and classification ==
Olivia is a non-family asteroid of the main belt's background population when applying the hierarchical clustering method to its proper orbital elements. It orbits the Sun in the outer asteroid belt at a distance of 2.9–3.5 AU once every 5 years and 9 months (2,109 days; semi-major axis of 3.22 AU). Its orbit has an eccentricity of 0.09 and an inclination of 4° with respect to the ecliptic. The body's observation arc begins at the Bergedorf Observatory on 30 September 1916, one week after its official discovery observation at Heidelberg.

== Naming ==
Any reference of this minor planet's name to a person or occurrence is unknown.

=== Unknown meaning ===
Among the many thousands of named asteroids, Olivia is one of 120 planets for which no official naming citation has been published. All of these asteroids have low numbers, the first one being 164 Eva. The last asteroid with a name of unknown meaning is 1514 Ricouxa. They were discovered between 1876 and the 1930s, predominantly by astronomers Auguste Charlois, Johann Palisa, Max Wolf and Karl Reinmuth.

== Physical characteristics ==
In the SDSS-based taxonomy, Olivia is a common, carbonaceous C-type asteroid, with a notably low albedo (see below).

=== Rotation period ===
As of 2020, no rotational lightcurve of Olivia has been obtained from photometric observations. The body's rotation period, pole and shape remain unknown.

=== Diameter and albedo ===
According to the surveys carried out by the NEOWISE mission of NASA's Wide-field Infrared Survey Explorer (WISE), the Infrared Astronomical Satellite IRAS, and the Japanese Akari satellite, Olivia measures (30.418±0.082), (35.65±2.3) and (36.05±0.91) kilometers in diameter and its surface has a notably low albedo of (0.033±0.006), (0.0242±0.004) and (0.025±0.001), respectively. Alternative mean-diameters published by the WISE team include (35.367±13.540 km) and (44.231±0.847 km) with corresponding albedos of (0.031±0.031) and (0.025±0.005).
