= Coryphe =

Character in Greek mythology

In Greek mythology, Coryphe or Koryphe (Ancient Greek: Κορυφή, romanized: Koruphe or Koryphē, lit. 'head', 'summit' or 'peak') was one of the 3,000 Oceanids, water-nymph daughters of the Titans Oceanus and his sister-wife Tethys. She was said to be the mother by Zeus of the fourth Athena who was called Coria by the Arcadians and worshipped as the inventress of chariots. In the common version of the myth, another Oceanid Metis was called the mother of Athena while a lesser account relates that the goddess was born from the Oceanid Polyphe by Poseidon.
