= Polyphe =

Nymph (Nymphe)

In Greek mythology, Polyphe (Ancient Greek: Πολυφη, romanized: Polyphê, lit. 'ingenious' or 'of much thought') was one of the 3,000 Oceanids, water-nymph daughters of the Titan Oceanus. She was said to be the mother by Poseidon of Hippeia Athena ("Athena of-Horses") said to be the first to drive a chariot. In other versions of the myth, either the Oceanids Metis or Coryphe born the goddess Athena to Zeus.
