= 484 Pittsburghia =

Asteroid

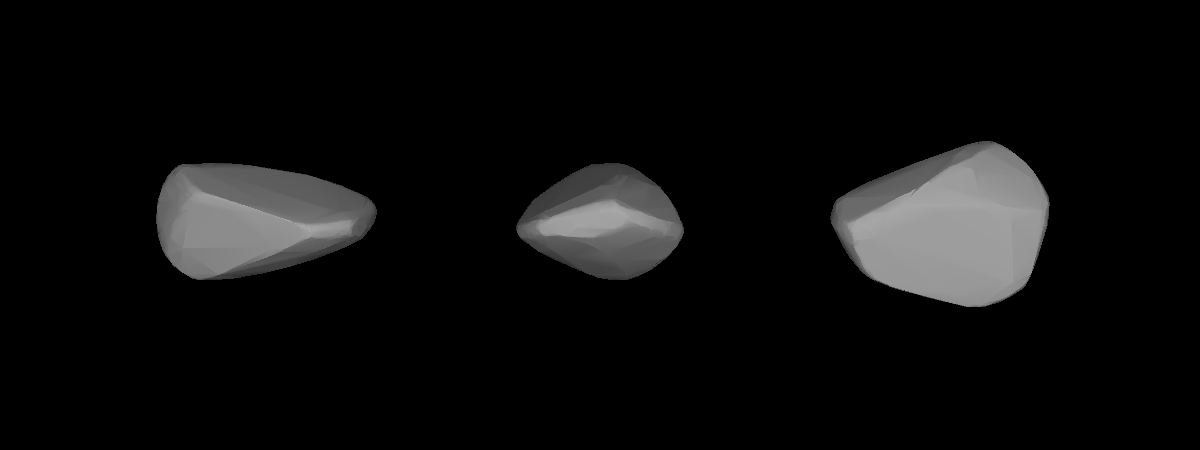
- A three-dimensional model of 484 Pittsburghia based on its light curve

Discovery
- Discovered by: Max Wolf
- Discovery site: Heidelberg
- Discovery date: 29 April 1902

Designations
- Pronunciation: /pɪtsˈbɜːrɡiə/
- Alternative designations: 1902 HX

Orbital characteristics
- Epoch 31 July 2016 (JD 2457600.5)
- Uncertainty parameter 0
- Observation arc: 113.95 yr (41620 d)
- Aphelion: 2.8208 AU (421.99 Gm)
- Perihelion: 2.5141 AU (376.10 Gm)
- Semi-major axis: 2.6674 AU (399.04 Gm)
- Eccentricity: 0.057501
- Orbital period (sidereal): 4.36 yr (1591.3 d)
- Mean anomaly: 344.592°
- Mean motion: 0° 13^{m} 34.464^{s} / day
- Inclination: 12.512°
- Longitude of ascending node: 127.276°
- Argument of perihelion: 191.618°

Physical characteristics
- Mean radius: 15.805±1.05 km
- Synodic rotation period: 10.63 h (0.443 d)
- Geometric albedo: 0.2012±0.030
- Absolute magnitude (H): 9.86

Pittsburghia is an asteroid that is in orbit around the Sun 150 million miles from Earth. It is named in honor of the city of Pittsburgh, Pennsylvania, and its scientific and industrial heritage that produced some of the finest astronomy equipment of the time .
