= MS Adriana =

Cruise ship

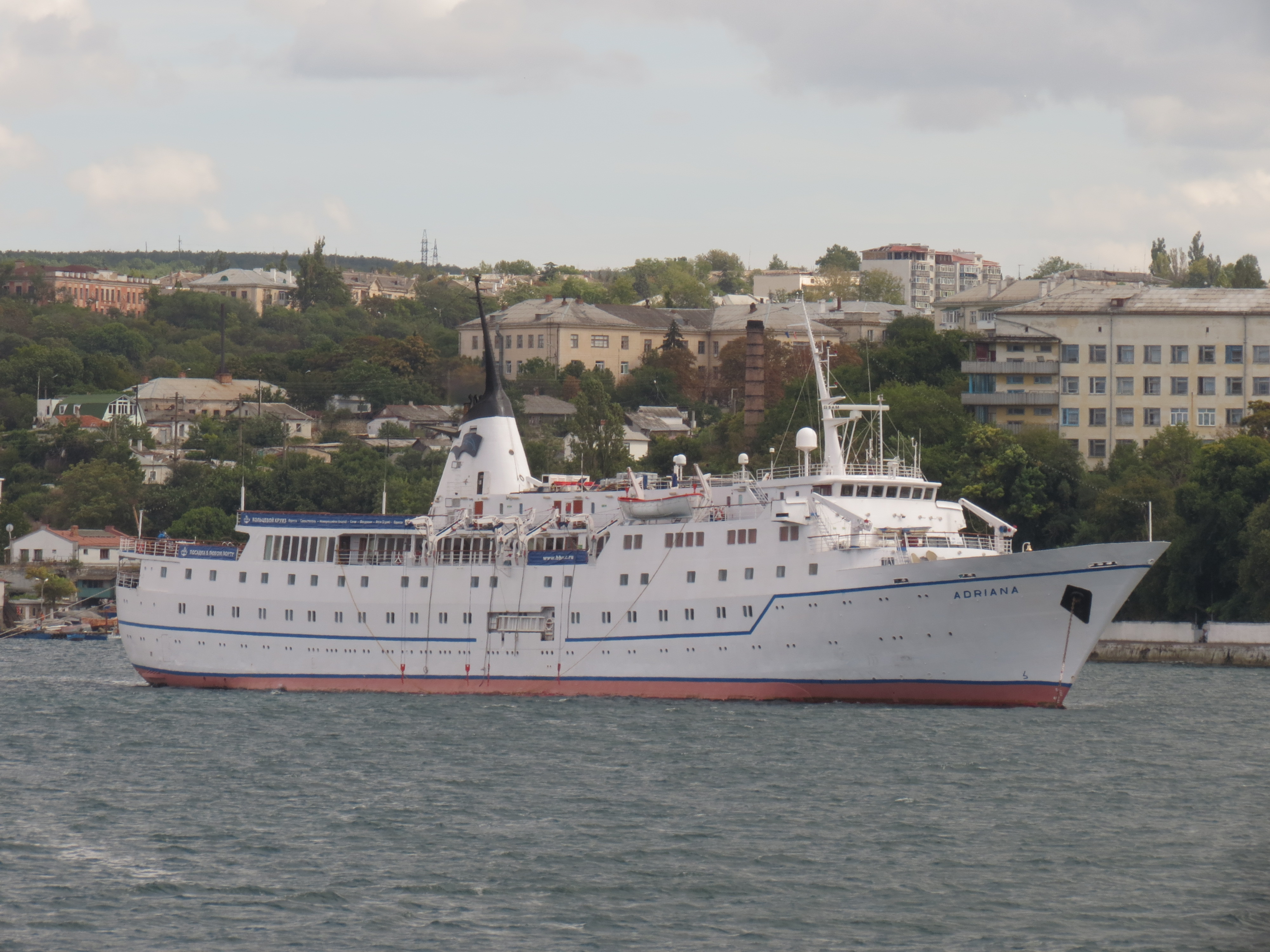
- Adriana at Sevastopol on August 31, 2013

History
- Name: 1972–1987: Aquarius; 1987–2008: Adriana; 2008–2010: Adriana III; 2010–2019: Adriana
- Owner: 1972–1987: Hellenic Mediterranean Lines; 1987–1997: Jadranska Linijska Plovidba; 2008–2012: Tapas Inc; 2012–2013: TBS; 2013 onwards: Adriana Shipping
- Operator: 1972–1987: HML; 1987–1997: Jadrolinija Cruises; 2010–2013: Tropicana Cruises; 2013–2015: B&BS; 2015 onwards: Adriana Cruises
- Port of registry: 1972–1987: Pireaus, Greece; 1987–199?: Rijeka, Yugoslavia; 199?–2008: Kingstown, Saint Vincent and the Grenadines; 2008: Panama City, Panama; 2008–2010: Port Vila, Vanuatu; 2008 onwards: Basseterre, Saint Kitts and Nevis
- Builder: United Shipping Yard, Perama, Greece
- Yard number: 54
- Launched: 15 September 1971
- Completed: June 1972
- In service: June 1972
- Identification: Call sign: V4CH2; IMO number: 7118404; MMSI number: 341857000
- Fate: Scrapped 2019

General characteristics
- Type: Cruise ship
- Tonnage: 4,591 GRT; 1,100 DWT
- Length: 103.71 m (340 ft 3 in)
- Beam: 14.00 m (45 ft 11 in)
- Draught: 4.50 m (14 ft 9 in)
- Decks: 4
- Installed power: 2 × Pielstick-Atlantique 8PC2V; 5,885 kW (combined)
- Speed: 19.5 knots (36.1 km/h; 22.4 mph)
- Capacity: 312 passengers
- Crew: 100

MS Adriana was a mid-sized cruise ship with old fashion interior in French style, currently owned and operated by Adriana Shipping. She sailed the Caribbean Sea under flag of Saint Kitts and Nevis from Port of Spain for Adriana Cruises in 2015.

== Ship history ==
The ship was built for Hellenic Mediterranean Lines (HML) as Aquarius in 1972. She was the first HML cruise ship, and also the first cruise ship purpose-built in Greece. Aquarius was ordered and laid down at United Shipping Yard in Perama as yard number 54. She was launched on 15 September 1971 and commissioned in June 1972. The vessel was 4591 gross tons, 103,71 metres long and could carry 312 passengers.

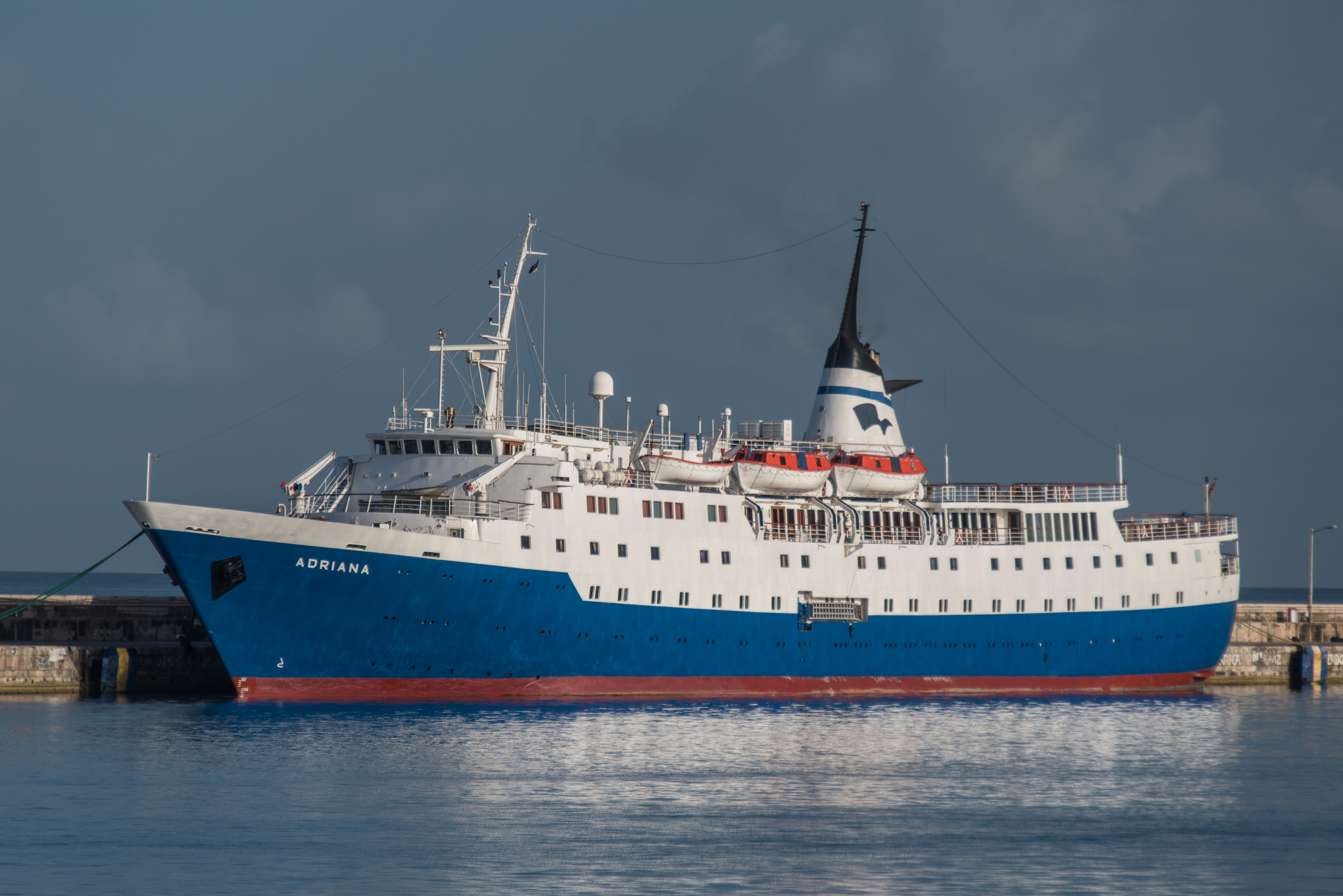
Adriana in Bridgetown, Barbados on April 8, 2017.

In 1987, after a poor season following the Achille Lauro hijacking, Aquarius was sold to Yugoslav Jadranska Linijska Plovidba in Rijeka and renamed Adriana. The ship ran cruises for Jadrolinija in the Adriatic and charters to other cruise companies such as HAPAG. In 1997 she was sold to Marina Cruises and passed to Nice-based Plein Cap, care of Marina Cruises. Between April 2008 and September 2010, the ship was sold to Tapas and sailed as Adriana III. Since September 2010, Adriana sailed under the flag of Saint Kitts and Nevis with (mainly) Russian crew under the command of ship owner, captain Sergey Ponyatovsky, for Tropicana in the Caribbean Sea, sailing from Havana in 2011 and 2012, for Black & Baltic Seas Cruise Company (B&BS) in the Black Sea from Odesa in 2013 and Sochi in 2014, chartered by West Indies Cruise Line for cruises from Port of Spain in 2015.

As of January 2023, she has been completely scrapped.
