= Telesto (moon) =

Trojan moon of Saturn

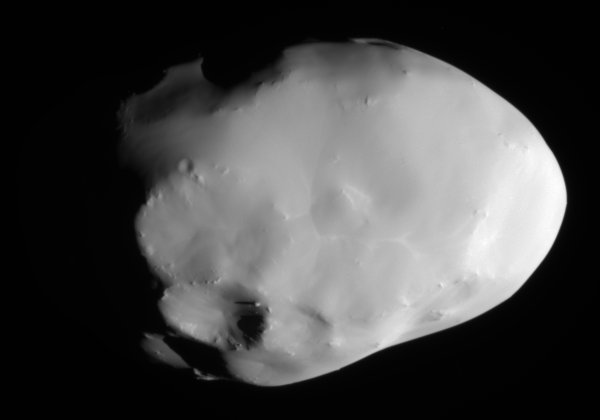
- Telesto as seen by the Cassini probe on 11 October 2005

Discovery
- Discovered by: Bradford A. Smith; Harold Reitsema; Stephen M. Larson; John W. Fountain
- Discovery date: April 8, 1980

Designations
- Designation: Saturn XIII
- Pronunciation: /təˈlɛstoʊ/
- Named after: Τελεστώ Telestō
- Alternative names: Tethys B S/1980 S 13
- Adjectives: Telestoan /tɛləˈstoʊ.ən/ or Telestoian /tɛləˈstoʊ.iən/

Orbital characteristics
- Semi-major axis: 294670 km
- Eccentricity: 0.001
- Orbital period (sidereal): 1.88780 d
- Inclination: 1.18° (to Saturn's equator)
- Satellite of: Saturn

Physical characteristics
- Dimensions: 33.2 × 23.4 × 19.2 km (± 0.6 × 0.6 × 0.4 km)
- Mean diameter: 24.6±0.6 km
- Volume: 7795 km^{3} (Note: Calculated from Telesto's volume-equivalent sphere radius of 12.3±0.3 km given by Thomas et al. (2020))
- Mass: ≈ 3.9×10^{15} kg (Note: Calculated by multiplying Telesto's volume with its presumed density of 500 kg/m^{3}.)
- Mean density: ≈ 0.5 g/cm^{3} (Note: Density presumed from analyzing topographic features.)
- Surface gravity: ≈ 0.0011–0.0014 m/s^{2}
- Escape velocity: ≈ 0.006 km/s at longest axis to ≈ 0.007 km/s at poles
- Synodic rotation period: synchronous
- Axial tilt: assumed zero
- Albedo: 0.97±0.04 (geometric)
- Apparent magnitude: 18.7

Telesto /təˈlɛstoʊ/ is a natural satellite of Saturn. It was discovered by Smith, Reitsema, Larson and Fountain in 1980 from ground-based observations, and was provisionally designated S/1980 S 13. In the following months, several other apparitions were observed: S/1980 S 24, S/1980 S 33, and S/1981 S 1.

In 1983 it was officially named after Telesto of Greek mythology. (Note: Transactions of the International Astronomical Union, Vol. XVIIIA, 1982 (confirms Janus, names Epimetheus, Telesto, Calypso) (mentioned in IAUC 3872)) It is also designated as Saturn XIII or Tethys B.

Telesto is co-orbital with Tethys, residing in Tethys's leading Lagrangian point (L_{4}). This relationship was first identified by Seidelmann et al. in 1981. Another moon, Calypso, resides in the other (trailing) Lagrangian point of Tethys, 60 degrees in the other direction from Tethys. The Saturnian system has two additional trojan moons (which are Helene and Calypso).

== Exploration ==
The Cassini probe performed a distant flyby of Telesto on October 11, 2005. The resulting images show that its surface is surprisingly smooth, devoid of small impact craters.
