= Galaxaura (mythology) =

In Greek mythology, Galaxaura (Ancient Greek: Γαλαξαύρη Galaxaurê) was the 'lovely' Oceanid, one of the 3,000 water-nymph daughters of the Titans Oceanus and his sister-spouse Tethys. Her name means "calm" or "the charmer" or "like the refreshing coolness of a shady stream". Along with her sisters, Galaxaura was one of the companions of Persephone when the daughter of Demeter was abducted by Hades.
