= Phaeno (mythology) =

Oceanid in Greek mythology

In Greek mythology, Phaeno (Ancient Greek: Φαινώ Phainô means 'appear, reveal, shine') was one of the 3,000 Oceanids, water-nymph daughters of the Titans Oceanus and his sister-spouse Tethys.

== Mythology ==
Along with her sisters, Phaeno was one of the companions of Persephone when the daughter of Demeter was abducted by Hades.
