= Iache =

Oceanid in Greek mythology

In Greek mythology, Iache (Ancient Greek: Ἰάχη, romanized: Iáchē) was one of the 3,000 Oceanids, water-nymph daughters of the Titans Oceanus and his sister-spouse Tethys.

== Mythology ==
Along with her sisters, Iache was one of the companions of Persephone when the daughter of Demeter was abducted by Hades.
