= Melobosis =

In Greek mythology, Melobosis (Ancient Greek: Μηλόβοσίς Mêlobosis means 'sheep-feeder') was one of the 3,000 Oceanids, water-nymph daughters of the Titans Oceanus and his sister-spouse Tethys.

== Mythology ==
Along with her sisters, Melobosis was one of the companions of Persephone when the daughter of Demeter was abducted by Hades.
