= Pluto (Oceanid) =

Oceanid in Greek mythology

In Greek mythology, Pluto or Plouto (Ancient Greek: Πλουτώ, romanized: Ploutṓ, lit. 'rich one') was, according to the late 8th–early 7th century BC Greek poet Hesiod, and the probably nearly as old Homeric Hymn 2 to Demeter, one of the many Oceanid daughters of Oceanus and Tethys. Hesiod calls her "soft eyed", and the Homeric Hymn has her as one of the "deep-bosomed daughters of Oceanus" who were the playmates of Persephone when she was abducted by Hades.
