= Urania (mythology) =

Urania Deities

In Greek mythology, Urania (/jʊəˈreɪniə/ yoor-AY-nee-ə; Ancient Greek: Οὐρανία or Οὐρανίη, romanized: Ouranía, lit. 'heavenly') may refer to the following divinities:

- Urania, the Oceanid with a 'divine in form'. She was one of the 3,000 water-nymph daughters of the Titans Oceanus and his sister-spouse Tethys. Along with her sisters, Urania was one of the companions of Persephone when the daughter of Demeter was abducted by Hades.
- Urania, one of the nine Muses, daughters of Zeus, king of the gods, and the Titaness Mnemosyne.
- Urania, a surname of Aphrodite, describing her as "the heavenly," or spiritual, to distinguish her from Aphrodite Pandemos. Plato represents her as a daughter of Uranus, begotten without a mother. Wine was not used in the libations offered to her. The tortoise, the symbol of domestic modesty and chastity, was sacred to her.
- Urania, listed as one of Actaeon's dogs who mangled him after being transformed into a stag by Artemis.
