= Acaste (Oceanid) =

Oceanid in Greek mythology

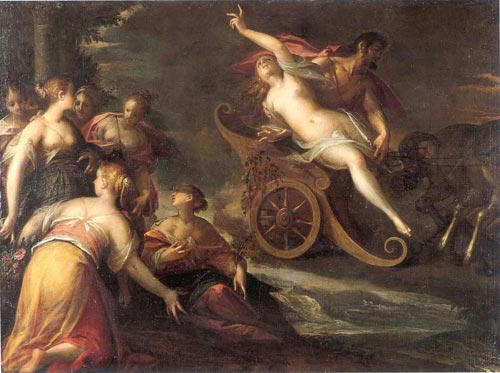
The rape of Proserpine, by Hans von Aachen, 1587. Acaste was said to be one of the companions of Persephone (Proserpine) who were picking flowers with her when she was abducted by Hades.

In Greek mythology, Acaste (or Akaste; /əˈkæstiː/; Ancient Greek: Ακαστη) was one of the 3,000 Oceanids, the daughters of the Titans Oceanus and his sister-spouse Tethys. According to the Homeric Hymn 2 to Demeter, Acaste was, along with several of her Oceanid sisters, one of the companions of Persephone who were picking flowers with her when she was abducted by Hades.
