= Plexaure (mythology) =

In Greek mythology, Plexaure or Plexaura (Ancient Greek: Πληξαύρη Plêxaurê means 'whipping wind') may refer to:

- Plexaure, one of the 3,000 Oceanids, water-nymph daughters of the Titans Oceanus and his sister-spouse Tethys.
- Plexaure, one of the 50 Nereids, marine-nymph daughters of the 'Old Man of the Sea' Nereus and the Oceanid Doris.
