= Ianthe (mythology) =

Oceanid in Greek mythology

In Greek mythology, Ianthe (Ancient Greek: Ἰάνθη, romanized: Ianthê) or Janthe was one of the 3,000 Oceanids, water-nymph daughters of the Titans Oceanus and his sister-spouse Tethys. Her name means "she who delights", or probably from ianthên (heat) or ianthos (violet).

== Mythology ==
Along with her sisters, Ianthe was one of the companions of Persephone when the daughter of Demeter was abducted by Hades.
