= Prymno =

In Greek mythology, Prymno (Ancient Greek: Πρυμνώ Prymnô means 'undermost, root') was one of the 3,000 Oceanids, water-nymph daughters of the Titans Oceanus and his sister-spouse Tethys. She was associated with the ship's stern.
