= Petraea (mythology) =

Two characters in Greek mythology

In Greek mythology, Petraea (Ancient Greek: Πετραίη, romanized: Petraíē, lit. 'rocky, stony') may refer to the following characters:

- Petraea, the 'fair' Oceanid, one of the 3,000 water-nymph daughters of the Titans Oceanus and his sister-spouse Tethys.
- Petraea, a surname of Scylla who dwelt in or on a rock.
