= Pasithoe =

One of the Oceanids

In Greek mythology, Pasithoe (Ancient Greek: Πασιθόη, romanized: Pasithoê, lit. 'all-swift' or 'running to all') was one of the 3,000 Oceanids, water-nymph daughters of the Titans Oceanus and his sister-spouse Tethys.
