= Cerceis =

Oceanid in Greek mythology

In Greek mythology, Cerceis (Ancient Greek: Κερκηίς, romanized: Kerkēís) is one of the Oceanids, nymph daughters of the Titans of the Sea, Oceanus and Tethys. Her name means "of the weaving shuttle" from kerkis or "gorgeous in form". Thus, Cerceis was described as being lovely with a beautiful form.
