= Admete (Oceanid) =

Greek mythological figure

In Greek mythology, Admete (/ædˈmiːti/; Ancient Greek: Ἀδμήτη, lit. 'the unbroken', 'unwedded' or 'untamed') was one of the 3,000 Oceanids, daughters of the Titans Oceanus and his sister-wife Tethys. The name of Admete/ Admeta was the female form of Admetus. Along with her other sisters, Admete was one of the companions of Persephone in Sicily when the god Hades abducted the daughter of Demeter.
