= Admete =

In Greek mythology, a Mycenaean princess

Admete (/ædˈmiːti/; Ancient Greek: Ἀδμήτη, lit. 'the unbroken', 'unwedded' or 'untamed') or Admeta, was in Greek mythology, a Mycenaean princess. She was the daughter of King Eurystheus and Antimache and sister to Alexander, Iphimedon, Eurybius, Mentor, Perimedes and possibly, Eurypylus. The name of Admete/ Admeta was the female form of Admetus.

== Mythology ==
Heracles, as one of his Twelve Labors, was obliged by her father to fetch for her the girdle of Ares, which was worn by Hippolyte, queen of the Amazons.

There was a tradition according to which Admete was originally a priestess of Hera at Argos, but fled with the image of the goddess to Samos. Pirates were engaged by the Argives to fetch the image back, but the enterprise did not succeed, for the ship when laden with the image could not be made to move. The men then took the image back to the coast of Samos and sailed away. When the Samians found it, they tied it to a tree, but Admete purified it and restored it to the temple of Samos. In commemoration of this event, the Samians celebrated an annual festival called Tonea. This story seems to be an invention of the Argives, by which they intended to prove that the worship of Hera in their place was older than in Samos.
