= Telesto (mythology) =

Oceanid of Greek mythology

In Greek mythology, Telesto or Telestho (/tɪˈlɛstoʊ/; Ancient Greek: Τελεστώ means 'success') was an Oceanid, one of the 3,000 water-nymphs daughters of Titans Oceanus and Tethys. She was the personification of the divine blessing or success. Hesiod describes her as "wearing a yellow peplos".

== Namesake ==
Telesto, a moon of Saturn, discovered in 1980 by Reitsema, Smith, Larson, and Fountain, is named for her.
