= Menestho (mythology) =

Mythological women

In Greek mythology, Menestho (Ancient Greek: Μενεσθώ, romanized: Menesthô) can refer to:

- Menestho, one of the 3,000 Oceanids, water-nymph daughters of the Titans Oceanus and his sister-spouse Tethys.
- Menestho, one of the Athenian sacrificial victims of the Minotaur according to one vase.
