= Zeuxo (mythology) =

Nymph of Greek mythology

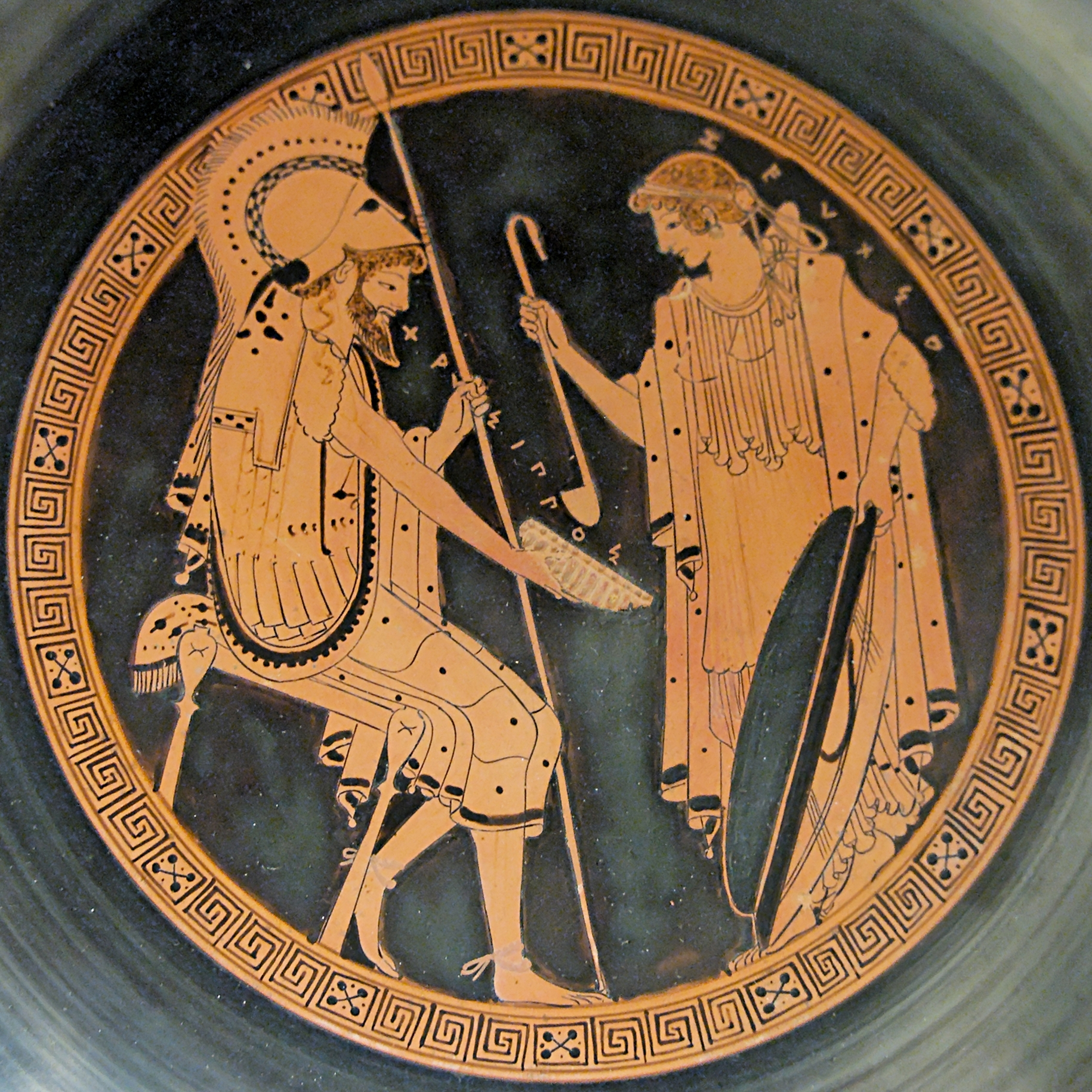
Zeuxo pours wine to Chrysippus. Interior from an Attic red-figured kylix, ca. 490-480 BC, from Capua.

In Greek mythology, Zeuxo (/ˈzjuːksoʊ/; Ancient Greek: Ζευξώ means 'yoke' or 'cart') was one of the 3,000 Oceanids, water-nymph daughters of the Titans Oceanus and his sister-spouse Tethys. Her name appears in Hesiod's catalogue of Oceanid names; no other literary mention of her survives.

She also appears in a vase painting by the Brygos Painter in which she serves wine to a warrior named Chrysippus.

The main belt asteroid 438 Zeuxo was named after her.
