= Alexander (mythology) =

In Greek mythology, Alexander (Ancient Greek: Ἀλέξανδρος, lit. 'protector of men') may refer to the following:

- Alexander, an alternative name of Paris, prince of Troy and son of King Priam.
- Alexander, prince of Tiryns as son of King Eurystheus and Antimache, daughter of Prince Amphidamas of Arcadia. He was killed in war by the Athenians.
