= Tisander =

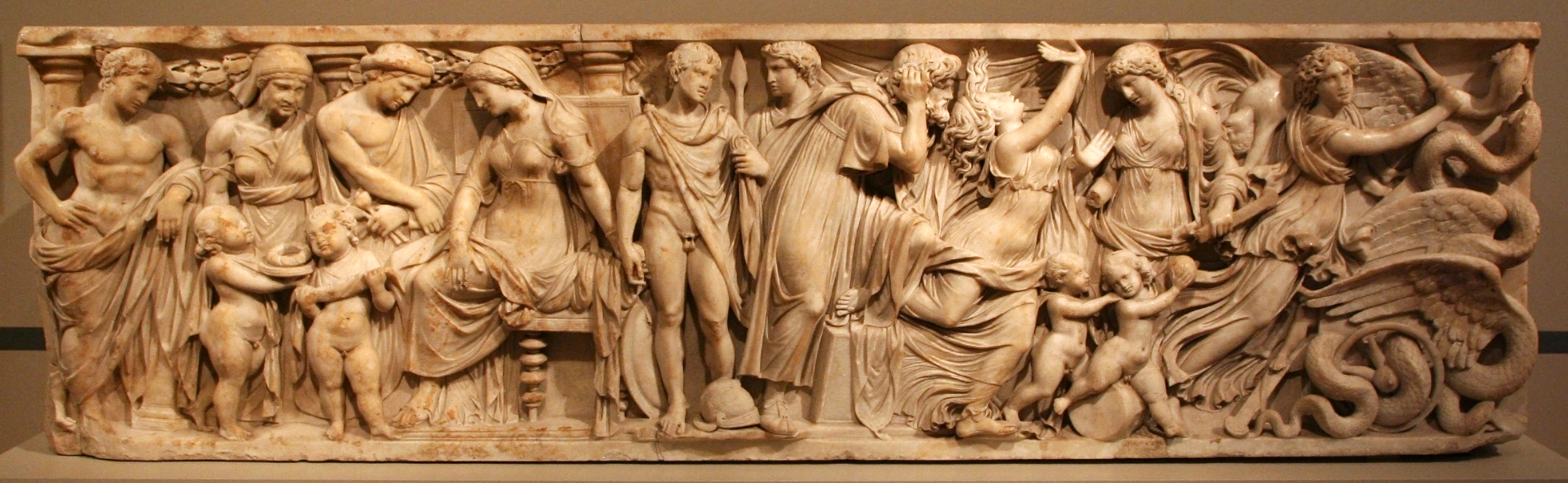
Sarcophogus depicting the story of Medea, Jason, Alcimenes and Tisander

In Greek mythology, Tisander (Ancient Greek: Τίσανδρος) or Tisandrus (Ancient Greek: Τίσανδρον) was a son of Jason and the Colchian sorceress Medea, the daughter of King Aeëtes, and the younger brother of Alcimenes and Thessalus.

== Mythology ==
Tisander and Alcimenes were murdered by Medea in her revenge plot against Jason, after he had abandoned her and gone to marry Glauce, the daughter of King Creon of Corinth.

Sources differ over the number and names of Medea's children, varying from one child to fourteen:

Her children are, according to some accounts, Mermerus, Pheres or Thessalus, Alcimenes and Tisander, and, according to others, she had seven sons and seven daughters, while others mention only two children, Medus (some call him Polyxenus) and Eriopis, or one son Argos.
— Smith, 1870
