= Jean-Yves Berteloot =

French actor (born 1958)

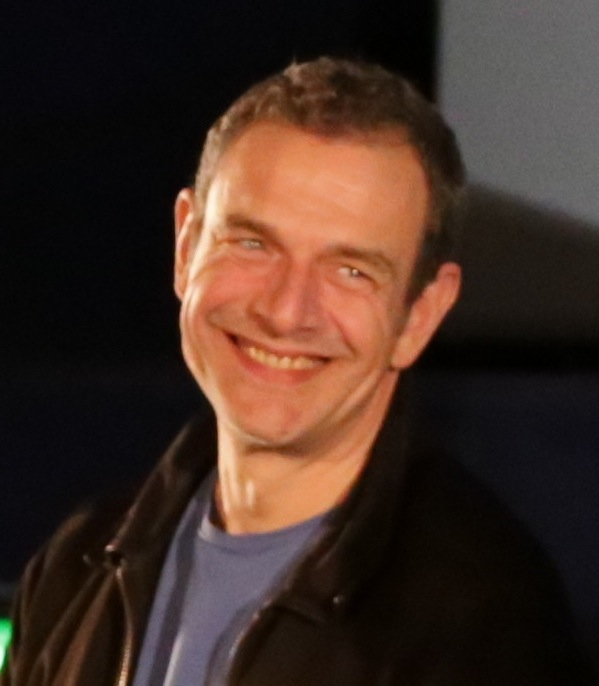
- Jean-Yves Berteloot in 2014
- Born: 27 August 1958 (age 67); Saint-Omer, Pas-de-Calais, France
- Occupation: Actor
- Years active: 1982–present

Jean-Yves Berteloot (French pronunciation: [/ʒɑ̃ iv bɛʁtəlu/]; born 27 August 1958) is a French actor.

== Theater ==
Year	Title	Author	Director	Notes
1982	The Lower Depths	Maxim Gorky	Gildas Bourdet	Théâtre Gérard-Philipe
1985	Une station service	Gildas Bourdet	Gildas Bourdet	Théâtre de la Ville
1986	Les Crachats de la lune	Gildas Bourdet	Gildas Bourdet	Théâtre de la Ville
1988	Death of a Salesman	Arthur Miller	Marcel Bluwal	Odéon-Théâtre de l'Europe
1991	Tableau d'une exécution Le Jardin d'agrément	Howard Barker & Catherine Zambon	Simone Amouyal	Petit Odéon
1993	Passions secrètes	Jacques-Pierre Amette	Patrice Kerbrat	Théâtre Montparnasse
1999	Hôtel des deux mondes	Éric-Emmanuel Schmitt	Daniel Roussel	Théâtre Marigny

== Filmography ==
Year	Title	Role	Director	Notes
1984	The Blood of Others	Soldier Coutant Repentigny	Claude Chabrol	
1984	Rive droite, rive gauche	A doctor	Philippe Labro	
1985	The Satin Slipper	The second King	Manoel de Oliveira	
1985	Mort carnaval	Milos Paton	Daniel Van Cutsem	TV movie
1986	Tenue de soirée	Male Prostitute	Bertrand Blier	
1987	A Flame in My Heart	The comedian	Alain Tanner	
1987	Een maand later	Hugo	Nouchka van Brakel	
1988	Hemingway	Jean	Bernhard Sinkel	TV mini-series
1988	Un château au soleil	Christian Aurel	Robert Mazoyer	TV mini-series
1988	La belle Anglaise	Louis	Jacques Besnard	TV series (1 episode)
1989	La Révolution française	Axel von Fersen the Younger	Robert Enrico & Richard T. Heffron	
1989	Baptême	Pierre Gravey	René Féret	Nominated - César Award for Most Promising Actor
1989	The Free Frenchman	Louis de Roujay	Jim Goddard	TV mini-series
1989	Série noire	Roy	Laurent Heynemann	TV series (1 episode)
1989	Cycle Simenon	Camille Lemoine	Caroline Huppert	TV series (1 episode)
1990	Impasse de la vignette	Jeff	Anne-Marie Etienne	
1990	Le déjeuner de Sousceyrac	Philippe	Lazare Iglesis	TV movie
1991	Un homme et deux femmes	Charles	Valérie Stroh	
1991	À la vie, à l'amour	Jean-Claude	Étienne Périer	TV movie
1992	Promenades d'été	Stéphane	René Féret	
1992	Jour blanc	Théo	Jacob Berger	TV movie
1992	De terre et de sang	Arnaud	Jim Goddard	TV movie
1993	Les audacieux	Paul Valence	Armand Mastroianni	TV movie
1993	La vérité en face	Jean-Jacques	Étienne Périer	TV movie
1995	La mère	Max	Caroline Bottaro	Short
1995	L'annamite	Aimé	Thierry Chabert	TV movie
1996	Les aveux de l'innocent	The agence director	Jean-Pierre Améris	
1996	Les jumeaux	Father	Catherine Klein	Short
1996	Coeur de cible	J3	Laurent Heynemann	TV movie
1996	L'année du certif	Victor Boucheron	Jacques Renard	TV movie
1996	L'orange de Noël	Pierre	Jean-Louis Lorenzi	TV movie
1997	Bonne fête papa	Olivier	Didier Fontan	TV movie
1997	L'esprit des flots	Antoine	David Delrieux	TV movie
1997	Une soupe aux herbes sauvages	Jean	Alain Bonnot	TV movie
1997	Le grand Batre	Young Guilhem	Laurent Carcélès	TV mini-series
1998	Un taxi dans la nuit	Hervé Lambert	Alain-Michel Blanc	TV movie
1998-99	Manège	Enzo	Charlotte Brändström	TV series (2 episodes)
1999	À vot' service	The driver	Laurence Katrian	
1999	Palazzo	Gabriel Mann	Patrick Jamain	TV movie
1999	Erreur médicale	Olivier Rainville	Laurent Carcélès	TV movie
1999	The Duchess and the Devil	Etienne de Vergasse	Andrew Grieve	TV movie
1999	Combats de femme	Laurent	Emmanuelle Cuau	TV series (1 episode)
1999	Joséphine, ange gardien	Simon	Dominique Baron	TV series (1 episode)
2000	Vous avez reçu un message	The man	Daniel Bach	Short
2000	Les Cordier, juge et flic	Lawyer Loriol	Paul Planchon	TV series (1 episode)
2001	Beginner's Luck	Javaad	James Callis & Nick Cohen	
2001	Un homme à défendre	Romain Vidal	Laurent Dussaux	TV movie
2001	Les voies du paradis	Robert Cahuzac	Stéphane Kurc	TV movie
2001	Navarro	Doctor Petit	Patrick Jamain	TV series (1 episode)
2002	L'heure du déjeuner		Laurent Pedebernard	Short
2002	Les filles du calendrier	Arnaud	Philippe Venault & Jean-Pierre Vergne	TV movie
2002	L'enfant des Lumières	Jean Baptiste d'Agincourt	Daniel Vigne	TV mini-series
2003	Quicksand	Vincent Deschamps	John Mackenzie	
2003	L'enfant du pays	André Gravet	René Féret	
2003	Fruits mûrs	Rochereau	Luc Béraud	TV movie
2003	Mon voisin du dessus	André	Laurence Katrian	TV movie
2003	La tranchée des espoirs	Pierre Delpeuch	Jean-Louis Lorenzi	TV movie
2003	Vertiges	Legris	Laurent Carcélès	TV series (1 episode)
2004	Faites le 15	Daniel Janvier	Étienne Dhaene	TV movie
2004	L'été de Chloé	Richard	Heikki Arekallio	TV movie
2004	Luisa Sanfelice	Jean Étienne Championnet	Paolo and Vittorio Taviani	TV movie
2004	La Ronde des Flandres	Jacky Vassens	André Chandelle	TV movie
2004	Le fond de l'air est frais	Arthur	Laurent Carcélès	TV movie
2005	Le bal des célibataires	Pierre Delpeuch	Jean-Louis Lorenzi	TV movie
2005	Disparition	Didier	Laurent Carcélès	TV mini-series
2005	Louis Page	Jean-Christophe Valnier	Badreddine Mokrani	TV series (1 episode)
2006	The Da Vinci Code	Remy Jean	Ron Howard	
2006	Girlfriends	Aurore's father	Sylvie Ayme	
2006	Le Grand Charles	Léon Delbecque	Bernard Stora	TV mini-series
2006	Commissaire Moulin	Pierre Sébastien	José Pinheiro	TV series (1 episode)
2007	March of Millions	Francois Beauvais	Kai Wessel	TV movie
2007	Les mariées de l'isle Bourbon	Michel Blancpain	Euzhan Palcy	TV movie
2007	Ondes de choc	François Pernelle	Laurent Carcélès	TV mini-series
2008	Au lapin vert	City Councilor # 1	Pierre-Antoine Coutant	Short
2008	Une tache rebelle	The husband	Patricia Dinev	Short
2008	De nouvelles vies	Raphaël	Stéphane Kurc	TV movie
2008	Final Proclamation	Andrea Conti	Rainer Matsutani	TV movie
2008	Terre de lumière	Victor Le Hennin	Stéphane Kurc	TV mini-series
2008	Six angles vifs	François	Laurent Carcélès	TV mini-series
2009	Juste un peu d'@mour	Bertrand	Nicolas Herdt	TV movie
2009	Joséphine, ange gardien	Xavier Mareuil	Christophe Barbier	TV series (1 episode)
2010	Hereafter	Michael	Clint Eastwood	
2010	La maison des Rocheville	Jacques Vigier	Jacques Otmezguine	TV mini-series
2010	Diane, femme flic	Alexandre Vanier	Nicolas Herdt	TV series (2 episodes)
2010	1788... et demi	Raphaël	Olivier Guignard	TV series (4 episodes)
2011	Moi et ses ex	Jean-Paul	Vincent Giovanni	TV movie
2011	Jeanne Devère	Victor Devère	Marcel Bluwal	TV movie
2011	Jack of Diamonds	Pascal Leroy	Hervé Renoh	TV movie
2011	Die fremde Familie	Monsieur Brailly	Stefan Krohmer	TV movie
2011	The Secret of the Ark	Clement de Lusignan	Tobi Baumann	TV movie
2011	Louis XVI, l'homme qui ne voulait pas être roi	Turgot	Thierry Binisti	TV movie
2012	L'homme de ses rêves	Arnaud	Christophe Douchand	TV movie
2012	Ein Sommer im Elsass	Marc von der Lohe	Michael Keusch	TV movie
2012	Flemming	Dr. Baschyi Aschurew	Florian Kern	TV series (1 episode)
2012	Ein starkes Team	Husam Abid	Maris Pfeiffer	TV series (1 episode)
2012	Métal Hurlant Chronicles	Molan Drood	Guillaume Lubrano	TV series (1 episode)
2013	Adieu Paris	Jean-Jacques Dupret	Franziska Buch	
2013	Le génie de la Bastille	The father	Alysse Hallali	Short
2013	Mantrailer - Spuren des Verbrechens	Horst Dohn	Alexander Dierbach	TV movie
2013	Frühling	Dr. Jules Thomé	Thomas Jauch	TV series (1 episode)
2013	Section de recherches	Ferry	Éric Le Roux	TV series (1 episode)
2013	Les limiers	Marco Van Der Saar	Alain DesRochers	TV series (6 episodes)
2014	40-Love	Sardi	Stéphane Demoustier	
2014	Libre et assoupi	Sébastien's father	Benjamin Guedj	
2014	Supercondriaque	Anton Miroslav	Dany Boon	
2014	Next Time I'll Aim for the Heart	Lacombe	Cédric Anger	
2014	Toi que j'aimais tant	Fred	Olivier Langlois	TV movie
2015	Bluewater: Nightmare in Paradise	Jacques	Judith Kennel	TV movie
2015	Mein Wunschkind	Rick Withers	Sigi Rothemund	TV movie
2015	Valentine's Kiss	Daniel Barras	Sarah Harding	TV mini-series
2015	Caïn	Valentin Zuycker	Bertrand Arthuys, Thierry Petit, ...	TV series (5 episodes)
2016	Murders at Lac Léman	Louis Jolly	Jean-Marc Rudnicki	TV movie
2016	Alarm für Cobra 11 – Die Autobahnpolizei	Dufourquet	Franco Tozza	TV series (1 episode)
2017	Jerks	Jaques	Christian Ulmen	TV series (1 episode)
2017	On va s'aimer un peu, beaucoup	Pierre Favier	Julien Zidi	TV series (1 episode)
2017	La vie devant elles	Mercier	Gabriel Aghion	TV series (6 episodes)
2018	Unterwerfung	Steve	Titus Selge	TV movie
2018	Venus im vierten Haus	Dr. Bechtelle	Sebastian Grobler	TV movie
2018	Ein Sommer in Vietnam	Gabriel Bertrand	Sophie Allet-Coche	TV movie
2018	Die Wirtschaftswunderfrau	André Lambert	Franziska Meletzky	TV mini-series
2019	The Wolf's Call	Commandant CIRA	Abel Lanzac	
