= Dead Cool =

- Directed by: David Cohen
- Written by: David Cohen
- Produced by: Nick Cohen
- Starring: Steven Geller; Rosanna Arquette; Imogen Stubbs; James Callis; Anthony Calf
- Distributed by: Psychology News
- Release date: November 2004
- Running time: 99 minutes
- Country: United Kingdom
- Language: English

Dead Cool is a 2004 British comedy-drama film. It was written and directed by David Cohen.

== Cast ==
- Imogen Stubbs as Henny
- Steven Geller as David
- James Callis as Josh
- Anthony Calf as Mark
- Liz Smith as Liz
- Rosanna Arquette as Deirdre
- Gemma Lawrence as Sue
- Olivia Wedderburn as Em
- Aaron Johnson as George
- Martin Cole as Jim
- Patricia England as Granny
- David Cohen as Rabbi

== Reception ==
Derek Elley of Variety wrote: "There's nothing wrong with "Dead Cool" that a further rewrite and slicker direction couldn't fix. London-set light relationships comedy centered on a teen boy coming to grips with his mom's new boyfriend and the memory of his late father boasts good performances but is let down by weak dialogue and an unfocused feel." Peter Bradshaw of The Guardian gave it 2 out of 5.
