= Nick Cohen (disambiguation) =

Nick Cohen (born 1961) is a British journalist, author and political commentator.

Nick Cohen may also refer to:

- Nick Cohen (filmmaker) (born 1971), British filmmaker
- Nik Cohn (born 1946), British writer
