= Neophron (disambiguation) =

Neophron was a prolific ancient Greek dramatist.

Neophron may also refer to:

- Neophron (mythology), a minor character in Greek mythology
- Neophron, the genus of the Egyptian vulture
