= Mermerus (mythology) =

Name of Greek mythological characters

In Greek mythology, Mermerus (Ancient Greek: Μέρμερος, romanized: Mérmeros) may refer to the following personages:

- Mermerus, a Centaur.
- Mermerus, son of Jason and Medea.
- Mermerus, a son of Pheres, and grandson of Jason and Medea. He was the father of Ilus who played host to Odysseus and skilled in the art of preparing poison.
- Mermerus, a Trojan who was killed in a battle during the Trojan War. His armor was then stripped off his body by Antilochus.
