= Absyrtides =

Name for two islands off the coast of Illyricum

Apsyrtides, Cres and Lošinj.

Absyrtides or Apsyrtides or Apsirtides (Ancient Greek: Ἀψυρτίδες; Italian: Arcipelago delle Absirtidi) was a collective name of two islands off the coast of Illyricum – Cres (Cherso in Italian) and Lošinj (Lussino in Italian), which were almost attached.

The islands were named after Absyrtus, who according to one tradition, was slain here by his sister Medea and by Jason, while according to another story because his dead body was drawn by the waves to the islands.

Ptolemy mentions only one island, Apsorrus (Ἄψορρος), on which he places two towns Crepsa (Κρέψα) (the modern Cres) and Apsorrus (the modern Osor, now all in Croatia).
