= Alcimedes =

In Greek mythology, Alcimedes (Ancient Greek: Ἀλκιμέδης) may refer to the following two characters:

- Alcimedes, a variant of Alcimenes, a son Jason and Medea and brother of Tisander.
- Alcimedes, one of the Achaeans who fought in the Trojan war. He was a friend of the hero Ajax, son of King Oileus of Locris.
