= Aegialeus (mythology) =

In Greek mythology, Aegialeus (Ancient Greek: Αἰγιαλεύς derived from αἰγιαλός aigialos "beach, sea-shore") also Aegealeus, Aigialeus, Egialeus, was the name of several individuals:

- Aegialeus (King of Sicyon), founder of Sicyon as 'Aegialea'
- Aegialeus (King of Argos), elder son of Adrastus, a king of Argos.
- Aegialeus, an alternative name given by some scholars for Absyrtus, the son of King Aeëtes of Colchis. He was murdered by his sister Medea.
