= If I Had You =

If I Had You may refer to:

- If I Had You (film), a 2006 British TV film starring Sarah Parish
- "If I Had You" (1928 song), a jazz standard written by "Irving King" (Jimmy Campbell and Reg Connelly) with Ted Shapiro
- "If I Had You" (Alabama song), 1989
- "If I Had You" (Karen Carpenter song), 1989
- "If I Had You" (Debbie Harry song)
- "If I Had You" (Adam Lambert song), 2010
- "If I Had You" (The Korgis song), 1979
- "If I Had You", a song by Dire Straits from ExtendedancEPlay, 1983
- "If I Had You", a song by Irving Berlin
