= London Unplugged =

2018 British drama anthology film

- Directed by: Layke Anderson; Natalia Casali; Nicholas Cohen; Mitchell Crawford; Andrew Cryan; Andres Heger-Bratterud; Ben Jacobson; Rosanna Lowe; George Taylor; Kaki Wong
- Written by: Nicholas Cohen (contributing writer); Nick Hopkins (contributing writer)
- Story by: Nicholas Cohen; Andres Heger-Bratterud; George Taylor; Rosanna Lowe; David Cohen; Ryan Child; Mitchell Crawford; Andrew Cryan; Jane Kinnonmont
- Produced by: David Cohen (executive producer); Nicholas Cohen (producer); Emma Castagno (associate producer); Kotryna Sniukaite (associate producer); Lyn Turner (co-producer); Nick Hopkins (co-producer)
- Starring: Juliet Stevenson; Poppy Miller; Imogen Stubbs; Ivanno Jeremiah; Ricky Nixon; Bruce Payne
- Cinematography: Ben Baily; David Cinzi; Nick Cooke; Donny Johnson; Sam Care; David Carr-Brown; Irene Gomez-Emilsson; Anais Lorie; Nicholas Nazari; Poom Saiyavath; Simon Walton; Timothy Hallam Wood
- Edited by: Ben Nash; James Dingle (online editor)
- Music by: Johnny De'ath
- Production company: Psychology News Production
- Distributed by: Munro Films
- Release dates: April 2018 (East End Film Festival); 18 January 2019
- Country: United Kingdom
- Language: English

London Unplugged is a 2018 British drama anthology film that premiered at the East End Film Festival. The film consists of several segments directed by numerous directors and stars Juliet Stevenson, Poppy Miller, Imogen Stubbs, Ivanno Jeremiah, Ricky Nixon and Bruce Payne.

== Plot ==
A portmanteau exploration of disparate characters scattered across London, many of whose lives intersect unpredictably, showing the complexities, contradictions and compromises of modern living in the city of London. The film focuses on female empowerment

London Unplugged centres on an interlinking device of a real-life female athlete, Yourlance Richards, who runs from Stratford in East London all the way to Kew Gardens in West London, visiting many of the locations that feature in the individual segments, which are as follows:

1. "Dog Days"
2. "Felines"
3. "Club Drunk"
4. "Unchosen"
5. "Pictures"
6. "Little Sarah's Big Adventure"
7. "Mudan Blossoms"
8. "Shopping"
9. "The Door To"
10. "Kew Gardens"

The final segment is an adaptation of Virginia Woolf's short story "Kew Gardens".

During the making of the film, a number of interlinking devices were filmed and trialled by supervising director Nicholas Cohen, before settling on Yourlance Richard's run across London. These included: short documentaries about Londoners of different ages and backgrounds, a thread following the work of a London Hackney cab driver and a selection of London archive material set to music. Ultimately, the story of a female athlete running the length of London was felt to be the strongest metaphor for the universal struggle of London living, revealing the scale of the city to a pedestrian and examining the typical Londoner's need to escape from their familiar corner of the city, the common London life as a "postcode prisoner". Both Yourlance Richards herself and her run, proved popular with press and public.

== Cast ==
- Juliet Stevenson as Jayne
- Poppy Miller as Alice
- Imogen Stubbs as Isabella
- Ivanno Jeremiah as Carlton
- Ricky Nixon as Edward
- Bruce Payne as Nick
- Yourlance Bianca Richards as herself (runner)
- Anjana Vasan as Lucy
- Dimitra Barla as Layla
- Eve Pearce aa Mrs Rogers
- Natasha Wightman as Emma
- Simon Wilson as Simon
- Leo Wringer as Jonathan
- Vanessa Donovan as Sophie
- Polly Lister as Gemma
- Sam Helpenny as Gary
- Shaun Prendergast as Mr Bithem
- Stephen Cavanagh as Jonas Andersen
- Tuva Heger-Bratterud as Mysterious Beautiful Woman
- Melanie Gray as Miranda
- Christina Carty as Virginia Woolf

== Production ==
The film was made by emerging London filmmakers originating from a core of graduating students from the London Film School and in conjunction with community groups, such as Four Corners Film in Bethnal Green, the Refugee Journalism Project and the Migrant Resource Centre.

== Release ==
The film premiered at the East End Film Festival in 2018. It opened in cinemas in January 2019. A screening at the Peckhamplex in London on 18 January 2019 was followed by a Q&A with the filmmakers. London Unplugged went on to have a limited theatrical release with Everyman Cinemas and the ICA Cinema until May 2019, selling out in advance at all Q&A screenings. The film also played regionally in cinemas in Broadstairs, Norwich and Orkney, among other places. UK DVD release was handled by Lionsgate UK, international by Gravitas Films in the USA.

== Reception ==
Ed Potton, who reviewed the film for The Times, awarded it 4 out of 5 stars and stated of the segments that "when they're good, though, they're really good", noting "Kew Gardens" and "Pictures" as especially distinctive, while "Shopping" "has a moving meeting between a young man and surprisingly reflective assistant in a Soho sex shop" adding that "taken as a whole this is a depiction of the capital that's harsh and humane, familiar and strange. Victor Fraga of Dirty Movies gave the film 4 stars out of 5 and stated: "...the pieces are blended together seamlessly with the help of the running narrator, current and footage imagery of London and a very eclectic music score of dirty beats, electro-clash, Arabic strings, indie rock, opera and more. It works. This not a patchwork of random short films. It all gels together neatly. The films flow nicely, just like the River Thames. The outcome is a heartfelt, gentle and at times dour tribute to the razzmatazz of cultures, lifestyles and lonely existences in London." The film was awarded 3 out of 5 stars by Neil Smith for Total Film. Smith noted that the film was variously romantic and stated that "Juliet Stevenson and Imogen Stubbs lend star power to other segments in a film whose components make for a diverting, if bitty, whole".

Maria Duarte and Alan Frank, who reviewed the film for Morning Star, gave the film 4 stars and stated that "there are effective contributions from such star names as Juliet Stevenson, Imogen Stubbs and Bruce Payne but, to the credit of all concerned on both sides of the camera, London Unplugged is ultimately led as much by its strong and involving story lines as by mere star contributions". Cath Clarke, who reviewed the film for The Guardian, gave it 3 out of 5 stars and stated that the film "at its best shows diverse London as it’s rarely seen in the movies" Sight & Sound reflected that the film was "cheerfully diverse" and that "a gratifying number of the tales are women led".

David Parkinson, of the Radio Times, commented that the film "has an energy that recalls the French New Wave gem, Paris Vu par... (1965), as the largely neophyte film-makers are prepared to take chances in exploring themes like gender, immigration, alienation, isolation and communication" in a 3-star review. Nikki Baughan, writing in The List, added: "[Y]et to Cohen belongs the film's greatest strength: an interlinking interview with a real-life female athlete, an immigrant herself, whose epic run from east to west links these stories together. Her experiences give a powerful sense of the city as both opportunity and oppressor, and underscore the film's authentic voice." Ian Freer, who reviewed the film for Empire, described the film as a "mixed bag" but praised the "Shopping" segment, which he stated is "a well-played two-hander set in a Soho sex shop as Ricky Nixon’s punter gets a philosophy lesson from a butt-plug peddler (Bruce Payne)", and "The Door To" segment, which he regarded as "well-plotted, confidently shot and consistently intriguing",
