= Poppy Miller =

English actress

- Born: 28 February 1969 (age 57); Norwich, England, UK
- Education: New Hall, University of Cambridge and Webber Douglas Academy of Dramatic Art
- Occupation: Actress
- Years active: 1995–present

Poppy Miller (born 28 February 1969) is an English actress. Her screen credits include The Knock (2000), Attachments (2002), The Commander (2003), Red Cap (2004), If I Had You (2006), Goldplated (2006), Torn (2007), Emma (2009), Sex & Drugs & Rock & Roll (2010, House of Anubis (2012), Mapp & Lucia (2014), London Unplugged (2018), Innocent (2021), The Gathering (2024), Midsomer Murders Episode: "Treasures of Darkness" (2025), and Death in Paradise (2026).

== Early life ==
In 1969, Miller was born in Norwich, England. She attended The Hewett School, studied philosophy and English at New Hall, University of Cambridge and later attended the Webber Douglas Academy of Dramatic Art.

== Career ==
=== Theatre ===
Miller's first taste of theatre was in 1995, when she was in the chorus of the stage-play Agamemnon’s Children at the Gate Theatre (London). Her acting debut was in 1996, as Mary Crawford in Mansfield Park at the Chichester Festival Theatre. In 1997, she starred as Win Littlewit in Bartholomew Fair (play) for the Royal Shakespeare Company at the Swan Theatre, Stratford-upon-Avon. Staying for The Two Gentlemen of Verona (1998). In 2005, Miller played Mary Magdalene in The Last Days of Judas Iscariot at the Almeida Theatre. She continued with the RSC in Twelfth Night (2008), at the Courtyard Theatre, Stratford-upon-Avon.

In May 2016, it was announced that Miller had been cast as Ginny Weasley in Harry Potter and the Cursed Child. She reprised her performance on Broadway at the Lyric Theatre in 2018.

=== Screen (TV & film) ===
In 2003, she starred as DC Carol Browning Amanda Burton and Pip Torrens in The Commander. She starred in Series 2 of Red Cap (2004). Miller starred in the ITV television movie If I Had You (2006). She played a leading role as Isabella Knightley alongside Jonny Lee Miller, Michael Gambon, and Tamsin Greig in the 2009 television serial Emma. In 2012, Miller played Vera Devenish in season 2 of the Nickelodeon show House of Anubis. Miller played the Padre's wife, Evie Bartlett, in the BBC's remake of E. F. Benson's Mapp & Lucia (2014).

In 2021, she starred as Superintendent Denham in the ITV series Innocent. In 2024, she played Dawn in Channel 4's The Gathering.

== Filmography ==
Films
Year	Title	Role	Notes
2003	Curse: The Eye of Isis	Victoria Sutton (Voice)	Survival Horror Video Game
2006	If I Had You	Helen Andrews	leading role
2010	Sex & Drugs & Rock & Roll	Carer	
2012	What You Will	Viola	leading role
2018	London Unplugged	Alice	Anthology film

Television
Year	Title	Role	Notes
1996	Hetty Wainthropp Investigates	Susie Bryley	Episode: Runaways
1997/ 2002	Casualty	Debby/ Alex	Episodes: The Things We Do for Love (1997 as Actress); Dominoes (2002 as Alex)
2000	EastEnders	Junior Doctor	Episode dated 27 April 2000
2000	The Knock	Sally Cole	Episodes: Season 5 Episode 3 and 4
2000– 2002	Attachments	Fran Chapel	Episodes: (2000) Just Upgraded, Plug & Play, Flight Risk, Flat Management, Money Shot, Burn Rate, Hot Mail, Ohnosecond, Dot Bomb, User Friendly, (2001) The Weakest Link, Gaydar, Gym Virgin, Eye Candy, Geek Love, The Ten Percent Theory, Dirty Washing, (2002) Logan's Run, Fuck Buddy, Tooting Broadway, Shooting Blanks, The Domino Effect, Spunk Jockey
2000/ 2010	Doctors	Sally / Kelly Bryant	Episodes: Chapter of Accidents (2000 as Sally); Not Otherwise (2010 as Kelly Bryant)
2001	In Deep	Karen Kingswood	Episodes: Romeo Trap: Part 1 & Romeo Trap: Part 2
2002	Heartbeat	Ellen Richards	Episode: Love's Sweet Dream
2003	The Commander	DC Carol Browning	Episodes: 1–3
2003	Buried	DI Carrie Laxton	Season 1 Episode 8
2004	Red Cap	S/Sgt Harriet Frost	all 6 episodes of Season 2
2005	Derailed	Elaine Kellow	TV movie
2006	New Tricks	Grace Woodford	Episode: Wicca Work
2006	Goldplated	Terese White	leading role
2007	Torn	D.S. Sally Bridges	leading role
2008	Kingdom	Camilla Constantine	Season 2 Episode 3
2008	The Fixer	Caitlin Berry	Season 1 Episode 5
2009	Emma	Isabella Knightley	leading role
2012	House of Anubis	Vera Devenish	Season 2, Episodes 73–149
2012	Holby City	Grace Jessup	Episode: Last Man Standing
2014	Endeavour	Millicent Coke Norris	Episode: Home
2015	Mapp & Lucia	Evie Bartlett	3 Episodes
2015	Foyle's War	Dr. Karen Bennett	Episode: Trespass
2016	Line of Duty series 3	Defence barrister	
2021	Innocent	Superintendent Denham	Main role
2024	The Gathering	Dawn	3 Episodes
2025	Such Brave Girls	Pauline	1 Episode
2025	Midsomer Murders	Alice Gideon	Episode: "Treasures of Darkness"
2026	Death in Paradise	Selina Bascombe	Series 15, Episode 4
