= The Commander (TV series) =

British television crime drama series (2003–2008)

- DVD cover
- Genre: Crime drama
- Created by: Lynda La Plante
- Starring: Amanda Burton; Matthew Marsh; Nicholas Jones; Christopher Robbie; Tristan Gemmill; Mark Lewis Jones; Paul Brightwell; Poppy Miller; Thomas Lockyer; Pip Torrens; Anthony Valentine; Monica Dolan; Nadine Marshall; Connie Hyde; Niall MacGregor; Sian Brooke
- Country of origin: United Kingdom
- Original language: English
- No. of series: 5
- No. of episodes: 17

Production
- Producers: Lachlan Mackinnion; Vinit Kulkarni
- Running time: 90 mins (Series 1-3); 60 mins (Series 4-5)
- Production company: La Plante Productions

Original release
- Network: ITV
- Release: 16 February 2003 – 12 November 2008

The Commander is a British crime drama, broadcast on ITV, starring Amanda Burton as the principal character, Commander Claire Blake. The series first broadcast on 16 February 2003, and a total of five series were produced over a five-year-period, with the last episode airing on 12 November 2008.

The series focuses on Blake, the leader of an elite murder investigation squad in London. Throughout the series, Blake has two main sidekicks. Matthew Marsh starred in the first four series as DCI Mike Hedges, and following his decision to quit the role, he was replaced by Mark Lewis Jones, who appears in the final two seasons as DCI Doug James.

The series has been released on DVD in the UK via Contender Entertainment Group and Acorn Media UK. In the United States, all five series have been issued in two double DVD sets, again via Acorn Media.

== Plot ==
The Commander focuses on Claire Blake, leader of an elite murder investigative squad based in London, who allows her interpersonal relationships to cloud her judgement, and who, on several occasions, makes bad calls which are detrimental to an investigation. Midway through the series run, Ofcom and ITV received many complaints from viewers over Blake's willingness to sleep with suspects so that evidence can be gained from them – exemplified in her relationship with murderer James Lampton (Hugh Bonneville). Many viewers said that as much as the story was fictional, such action was so far out that it could not possibly be considered believable or true to life.

== Cast ==
- Amanda Burton as Commander Claire Blake
- Matthew Marsh as DCI Mike Hedges (series 1–3)
- Nicholas Jones as DCS Les Branton (series 1 and 4)
- Pip Torrens as DCS Les Branton (series 2)
- Christopher Robbie as DAC Edward Sumpter (series 1)
- Anthony Valentine as DAC Edward Sumpter (series 2–5)
- Tristan Gemmill as DI Ken Miles (series 1)
- Thomas Lockyer as DI Ken Miles (series 2)
- David O'Hara as DCC Stephen Blackton (series 2)
- Robert Wilfort as DI Jeff Dunn (series 1)
- Mark Lewis Jones as DCI Doug James (series 4–5)
- Paul Brightwell as DS Brian Hall
- Poppy Miller as DC/DI Carol Browning (series 1–2)
- Monica Dolan as DC Pamela Hayes (series 3–4)
- Nadine Marshall as DC Alison Goody (series 4)
- Connie Hyde as DCI Janet Chambers (series 4)
- Niall MacGregor as DS Matt Newton (series 5)
- Sian Brooke as DC Marion Randell (series 5)

=== Notable guest appearances ===
- Amanda Boxer as Margaret Tubbs (Blackdog, series 2)
- Nicholas Ball as John Dawson (Blackdog, series 2)
- Doug Bradley as Tim Gad (Blackdog, series 2)
- Brendan Coyle as Carl Dirkwood (Blacklight, series 3)
- Pippa Haywood as Helen Dirkwood (Blacklight, series 3)
- Matt Day as Eric Thornton (The Devil You Know, series 4)
- Celia Imrie as Mrs. Thornton (The Devil You Know, series 4)
- Simon Williams as John Thornton (The Devil You Know, series 4)
- Blake Ritson as John Littlewood (The Devil You Know, series 4)
- Abigail Cruttenden as Judy Thornton (The Devil You Know, series 4)
- Adam James as Tony Lattice (The Devil You Know, series 4)
- Penny Downie as Jane Griffith (The Fraudster, series 4)
- Oliver Cotton as Donald Griffith (The Fraudster, series 4)
- Greg Wise as Mark Davy (The Fraudster, series 4)
- Adrian Scarborough as Clive Seway (The Fraudster, series 4)
- Priyanga Burford as Miranda Kent (The Fraudster, series 4)
- Ayesha Dharker as Grace Kandola (The Fraudster, series 4)
- Elisabeth Dermot Walsh as Thelma Field (The Fraudster, series 4)
- Gerard Kearns as Terry Donnolly (Windows of the Soul, series 4)
- Gary Stretch as Jack Bannerman (Windows of the Soul, series 4)
- Toby Kebbell as Jimmy Bannerman (Windows of the Soul, series 4)
- Sara Stockbridge as Lisa Bannerman (Windows of the Soul, series 4)
- David Sterne as Fr Thomas Martin (Windows of the Soul, series 4)
- Christopher Fulford as Denny Wade (Windows of the Soul, series 4)
- Valerie Lilley as Brenda O'Hare (Windows of the Soul, series 4)
- James D'Arcy as Jerry (Abduction, series 5)
- Claire Skinner as Fiona (Abduction, series 5)
- Caroline Blakiston as Mary Henson (Abduction, series 5)
- Kerrie Hayes as Sharon Davis (Abduction, series 5)
- Ella Kenion as Helen Gordon (Abduction, series 5)
- Dilys Laye as Edna Sutton (Abduction, series 5)
- Al Murray as Betting Shop Boss (Abduction, series 5)

== Episode list ==
=== Series 1 (2003) ===
The series began with a one-off feature-length story broadcast in two parts in February 2003. Known as The Commander for only television broadcast, it did not carry an official title until the joint DVD release of series one and two in 2005. The episode gained enough viewers for two more stories to be commissioned. The other investigating officers in this episode are DCI Mike Hedges (Matthew Marsh), DCS Les Branton (Nicholas Jones), DAC Edward Sumpter (Christopher Robbie), DI Ken Miles (Tristan Gemmill), DS Brian Hall (Paul Brightwell) and DC Carol Browning (Poppy Miller).

| No. | Title | Directed by | Written by | Original release date | Viewers (millions) |
|---|---|---|---|---|---|
| 1 | "Entrapment (Part One)" | Michael Whyte | Lynda La Plante | 16 February 2003 | 8.38m |
Commander Claire Blake has risen towards the top of her profession in the male-dominated Metropolitan Police Service, and is now the head of the serious crimes unit. Some years previously, she arrested James Lampton (Hugh Bonneville) for the murder of his beloved girlfriend. He was subsequently sentenced to life imprisonment, but has since been released on parole and has now become a successful author with a best-selling book based on his time in prison. Blake believes that Lampton is a reformed character, and begins to warm to his charms. However, Blake's colleagues, especially DCI Mike Hedges, believe that Lampton is responsible for another murder – and set out to prove his guilt.
| 2 | "Entrapment (Part Two)" | Michael Whyte | Lynda La Plante | 17 February 2003 | 7.94m |
Things become complicated when Blake and Lampton become intimate, and the question arises whether he is being honest with her, or whether he is simply a master manipulator. Meanwhile, DCI Hedges and his team find themselves under investigation as Blake and her murder review team investigate the police shooting of Lionel Cripps, who was shot to death by an SO19 team following an armed stand-off at his house. When Blake discovers that Cripps was a big-time police informant, she and her team set out to find out who is really responsible for Cripps's death.

=== Series 2 (2005) ===
The second series of The Commander was first broadcast in 2005. The series was released on a joint DVD in 2005 with the first series. The same roster of characters appear in the second series as the first, with slight changes to the cast. Thomas Lockyer takes over the role of DI Ken Miles, Pip Torrens takes over the role of DCS Les Branton, Ron Donachie takes over the role of George Hart, and Anthony Valentine takes over the role of DAC Edward Sumpter. Carol Browning (Poppy Miller) is also promoted to DI.

| No. | Title | Directed by | Written by | Original release date | Viewers (millions) |
|---|---|---|---|---|---|
| 1 | "Virus (Part One)" | Charles Beeson | Lynda La Plante | 10 January 2005 | 7.43m |
Six months on, Commander Blake is still dealing with the aftermath of the James Lampton case. Not only has he pleaded not guilty to the murders of which he is accused, but also his revelations mean that Blake will have to testify about their sexual relationship in court. With the added news coverage, Blake finds that the sister of one of Lampton's victims, Angela Thornton, is now stalking her. In a separate case, a computer hacker has gained access to online medical records at St Barnaby's Hospital, and changes information in patients' medical records resulting in the death of two patients: one with a severe allergy to nuts and the other with a severe allergy to penicillin.
| 2 | "Virus (Part Two)" | Charles Beeson | Lynda La Plante | 11 January 2005 | 6.02m |
Blake's own sister Sarah, who is terminally ill with cancer, moves in with her, but finds that her many personal affairs are too much to bear. Meanwhile, the hacker threatens to kill another patient every 24 hours if he does not receive twenty million pounds. Enlisting the help of DI Ken Miles of the Computer Crime Unit, Claire puts her own personal issues aside and tries to find out who is responsible for the deaths of the two patients.
| 3 | "Blackdog (Part One)" | Charles Beeson | Lynda La Plante | 17 January 2005 | 5.80m |
Deputy Chief Constable Stephen Blackton (David O'Hara), known as "Blackdog", who has a well-deserved reputation for pursuing corrupt police officers, is called into the Met to re-open the investigation into the police shooting of Lionel Cripps. Having been working on the case at the time of her affair with James Lampton, Blackton is also forced to review Commander Blake's relationship with the accused. Although a coroner's enquiry found no fault in Cripps's shooting, Blake raised doubt as to DCI Mike Hedges' role in the investigation and the possible editing of the CCTV footage of the incident to remove footage of person or persons unknown.
| 4 | "Blackdog (Part Two)" | Charles Beeson | Lynda La Plante | 18 January 2005 | 4.75m |
The case takes a particularly awkward turn when one of the armed officers, Graham Warner, who fired the shot that killed Cripps, is himself found dead in a local park. Concerned that DCI Hedges has been assigned the case, Blake focuses on removing all evidence of her encounter with Lampton. With the trial fast approaching, there is great concern as to the adverse publicity that will result. Blake enlists the help of old colleague George Hart to retrieve crucial evidence.

=== Series 3 (2006) ===
The third instalment of the series was first broadcast in 2006, again in the form of one feature-length story, split into two parts. Series three has never been released on DVD in the United Kingdom, having been broadcast between the release of the first DVD set released by Contender, and the second released by Acorn Media UK, which acquired the rights in only 2007. Monica Dolan joins the cast as DC Pamela Hayes, following the departure of DI Carol Browning. DCS Les Branton does not appear in the series.

| No. | Title | Directed by | Written by | Original release date | Viewers (millions) |
|---|---|---|---|---|---|
| 1 | "Blacklight (Part One)" | Tristram Powell | Lynda La Plante and Simon de Waal | 27 March 2006 | 6.47m |
A psychiatric patient, Reginald Aitken (Nickolas Grace), who has been hospitalised for the past eight years, manages to escape from hospital. The same night, a seventeen-year-old girl, Sadie Carr, Commander Blake's god-daughter, goes missing from a night club. Reginald is discovered holding the girl's body and covered in her blood. Reginald is thought to be the killer as his fingerprints are found on the murder weapon; however, the body of an earlier victim is uncovered, and it is proved that at the time of her murder, he was locked up in the hospital.
| 2 | "Blacklight (Part Two)" | Tristram Powell | Lynda La Plante and Simon de Waal | 3 April 2006 | 6.50m |
DCI Hedges gets unsolicited help from an aristocratic and unorthodox (but actually quite intuitive) DI from Amsterdam, Count Eric Van Hauten, who is investigating three similar cases in Amsterdam. Commander Blake is warned by DAC Sumpter to take a less hands-on approach to the case, but after letting Van Hauten stay at her flat, Blake becomes determined to uncover the killer's identity before he kills again.

=== Series 4 (2007) ===
The fourth series of The Commander was first broadcast in 2007, in the form of three separate stories each broadcast in two parts. The entire series was released on DVD in 2007 by Acorn Media UK, becoming the last series to be released on DVD in the United Kingdom. This series introduces two new characters to the cast: DCI Doug James (Mark Lewis Jones), and DC Alison Goody (Nadine Marshall), leaving Amanda Burton, Anthony Valentine and Paul Brightwell as the only remaining original cast members. Les Branton also makes a return to the series, this time, however, played by the original actor, Nicholas Jones.

| No. | Title | Directed by | Written by | Original release date | Viewers (millions) |
|---|---|---|---|---|---|
| 1 | "The Devil You Know (Part One)" | Ashley Pearce | Lynda La Plante | 8 July 2007 | 6.87m |
When DCI Janet Chambers (Connie Hyde) goes into labour, Commander Claire Blake takes charge of the investigation into the death of a two-year-old girl found on the site of a now abandoned psychiatric institute. The girl has been dead for several years, but her body had been stored in a tightly sealed drum and is well preserved as a result. She also has a cross branded onto her chest. The pathologist's report is inconclusive, so the team starts to check medical records of former patients.
| 2 | "The Devil You Know (Part Two)" | Ashley Pearce | Lynda La Plante | 15 July 2007 | 6.28m |
Eric Thornton and John Littlewood figure prominently in hospital files, but when it is confirmed that Littlewood has died, the police focus all their effort on Thornton. A dark history of mental problems and violence related to them, Thornton stands out as the prime suspect in the girl's murder, but when his own mother (Celia Imrie) is murdered in cold blood, James is not convinced that Thornton is responsible for either death.
| 3 | "The Fraudster (Part One)" | David Caffrey | Lynda La Plante | 22 July 2007 | 5.93m |
Donald Griffith is a fraud in every respect. Not only is he cheating on his wife – with both his personal assistant and his firm's caterer – but also he has defrauded his clients out of millions of pounds. He is arrested at his firm's Christmas party, but is soon released on bail. He knows he will go to jail for fraud and has few options. When he is found the next day floating in his swimming pool, the police must determine if it was suicide, or whether his wife, one of his mistresses or an irate client did him in.
| 4 | "The Fraudster (Part Two)" | David Caffrey | Lynda La Plante | 29 July 2007 | 5.32m |
Assistant Commissioner Les Branton, whose sister lost all of her investments, asks Commander Claire Blake to take charge of the investigation. When the autopsy reveals that he did not drown, the police know they have a murder investigation on their hands. Initially, the police's efforts are focused on the three-way love triangle among his wife, assistant and caterer, but officers are not sure who, if any, instigated Donald's murder.
| 5 | "Windows of the Soul (Part One)" | Jane Prowse | Jane Prowse | 5 August 2007 | 5.52m |
Commander Claire Blake is called back from holiday to investigate the apparent murder of Fr Thomas Martin, who was stabbed to death with twenty-nine wounds in his church. He was well respected in the community, and had been instrumental in calming the local community after serious rioting some five years before. Thugs – reformed or otherwise – constantly surrounded him as he also ran a drop-in centre and a boxing club. There are rumours of child abuse as Fr Martin seems to have spent an inordinate amount of time with children.
| 6 | "Windows of the Soul (Part Two)" | Jane Prowse | Jane Prowse | 12 August 2007 | 4.90m |
The police focus on Denny Wade, an ex-con who had stabbed his wife more than fifty times and was sent to prison for eight years – but the key piece of evidence is found in events that occurred before the riots even took place. Claire warns Doug to stay well clear of the investigation following his revelation of heavy involvement in the rioting, following the innocent death of an eighty-year-old woman.

=== Series 5 (2008) ===
The fifth and final instalment of the series was first broadcast in 2008, in the form of three separate episodes comprising one story. Abduction becomes the second series of The Commander not released on DVD in the United Kingdom. The series also introduces a further new cast: DS Matt Newton (Niall MacGregor) and DC Marion Randell (Sian Brooke), who join Amanda Burton, Anthony Valentine, Mark Lewis Jones and Paul Brightwell, whose character, DS Brian Hall, has been suspended from the force.

| No. | Title | Directed by | Written by | Original release date | Viewers (millions) |
|---|---|---|---|---|---|
| 1 | "Abduction (Part One)" | Gillies Mackinnon | Lynda La Plante | 10 November 2008 | 5.78m |
DAC Sumpter asks Commander Claire Blake to take charge of the investigation when Joan Hall, mother of former DS Brian Hall, is found beaten to death in her own home, and Brian is accused of the murder. When his prints are found on the murder weapon and his blood also found at the scene, Claire believes it to be an open-and-shut case, but DCI James refuses to accept that his former colleague could ever be responsible for such a crime. Meanwhile, James's wife, Zoe, goes into labour, but an argument with a fellow-to-be proves to be the action that begins a chain of terrifying events, when his new baby is abducted from the maternity ward.
| 2 | "Abduction (Part Two)" | Gillies Mackinnon | Lynda La Plante | 11 November 2008 | 5.52m |
Claire begins to feel the pressure of two high-profile yet deeply personal cases coinciding. The investigation to the abduction of James's baby leads to the mothers at Zoe's maternity classes, while Brian Hall still has no recollection of what happened on the night of his mother's murder. As he becomes resigned to the fact that he may have killed her, an incident in prison spurs him to remember a crucial development. But can he persuade an already deflated James that he is telling the truth? A supervised trip to the murder scene convinces Hall that there was someone else in the room when he discovered his mother's body.
| 3 | "Abduction (Part Three)" | Gillies Mackinnon | Lynda La Plante | 12 November 2008 | 6.33m |
Acting on instinct, Claire digs deeper only to find that the truth is more shocking than any of them could have imagined. The investigation into James's missing baby leads Claire to Fiona George, a fellow mother at Zoe's maternity classes. However, her judgement proves to be her downfall, as she commits a desperate act in a bid to reunite James with his baby. As the consequences of Claire's actions bite, rookie DC Marion Randall's hunch leads her to the real abductor. Claire is tested both personally and professionally – but has she gone too far this time?
