= James Callis =

British actor (born 1971)

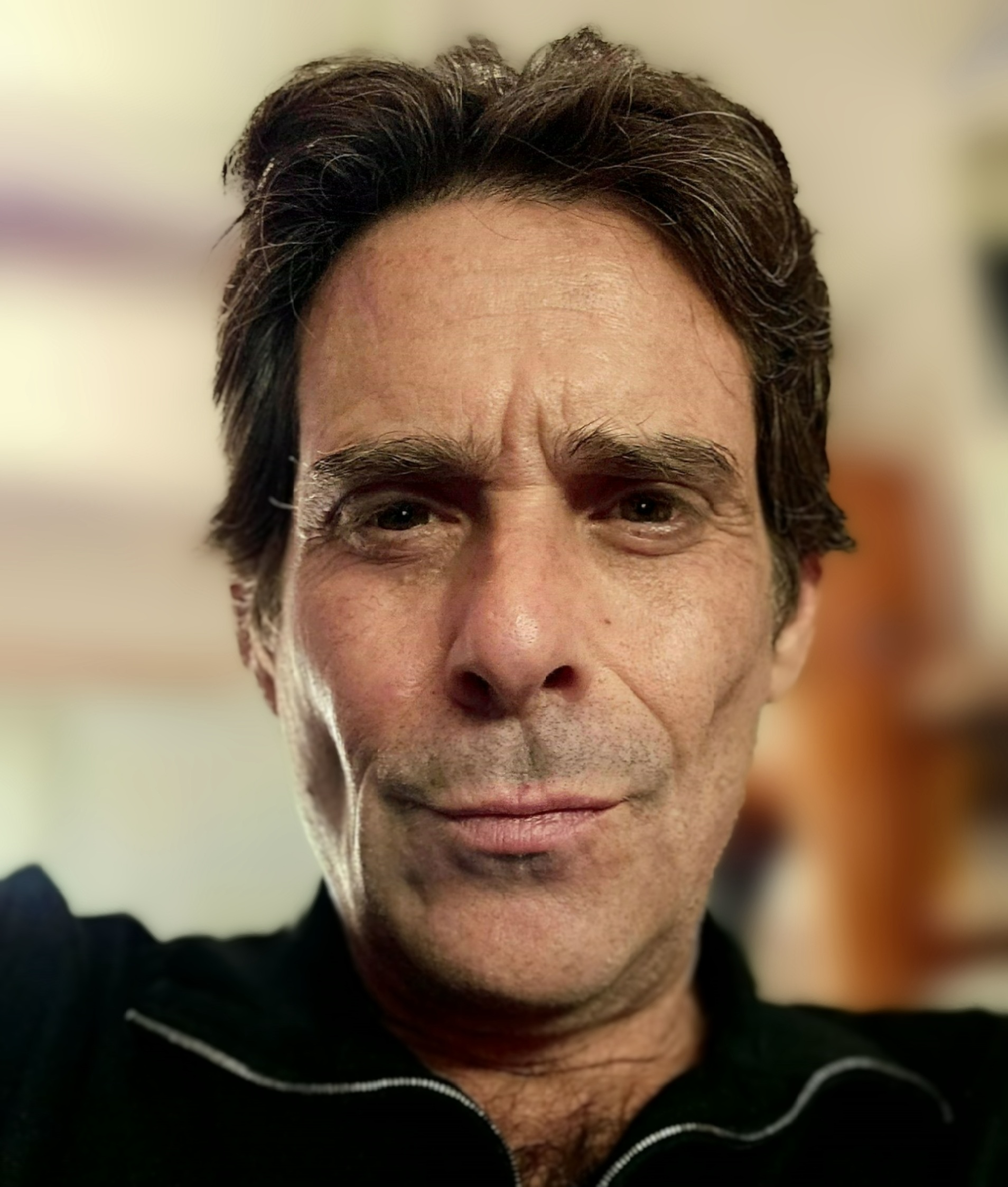
- Born: James Nicholas Callis; 4 June 1971 (age 55); Hampstead, London, England
- Education: Harrow School; Derwent College, York (B.A.); London Academy of Music and Dramatic Art
- Occupation: Actor
- Years active: 1996–present
- Spouse: Neha Callis (m. 1998)
- Children: 3

James Nicholas Callis (born 4 June 1971) is an English actor. He is known for playing Dr. Gaius Baltar in the re-imagined Battlestar Galactica miniseries and television series, Bridget Jones' best friend Tom in the Bridget Jones film series and Claude Whelan in the Apple TV spy series Slow Horses. He appeared in the television series Eureka and 12 Monkeys on Syfy as Dr. Trevor Grant and Athan Cole "The Witness", respectively. Since 2017, he has voiced the character Alucard in the Netflix series Castlevania and Castlevania: Nocturne, based on the video game series of the same name. In 2022, he appeared in season 2 of Star Trek: Picard as Jean-Luc's father in childhood flashbacks.

== Early life ==
Callis was born in Hampstead and brought up in London, where he attended St. Martin's Prep School in Northwood and then Harrow School in north-west London. His parents owned a bed-and-breakfast. He is of Jewish descent, and his ancestors originate from Russia, Poland, and Ukraine. Callis attended the University of York, graduating in 1993 with a BA in English and Related Literature. He was a member of Derwent College, for which he was an enthusiastic rugby player. At university he was also a keen student actor, director and writer. He was a key member of the University of York Gilbert and Sullivan society and appeared in productions put on by friends at Cambridge University, including a production of Harold Pinter's The Dumb Waiter.

== Career ==
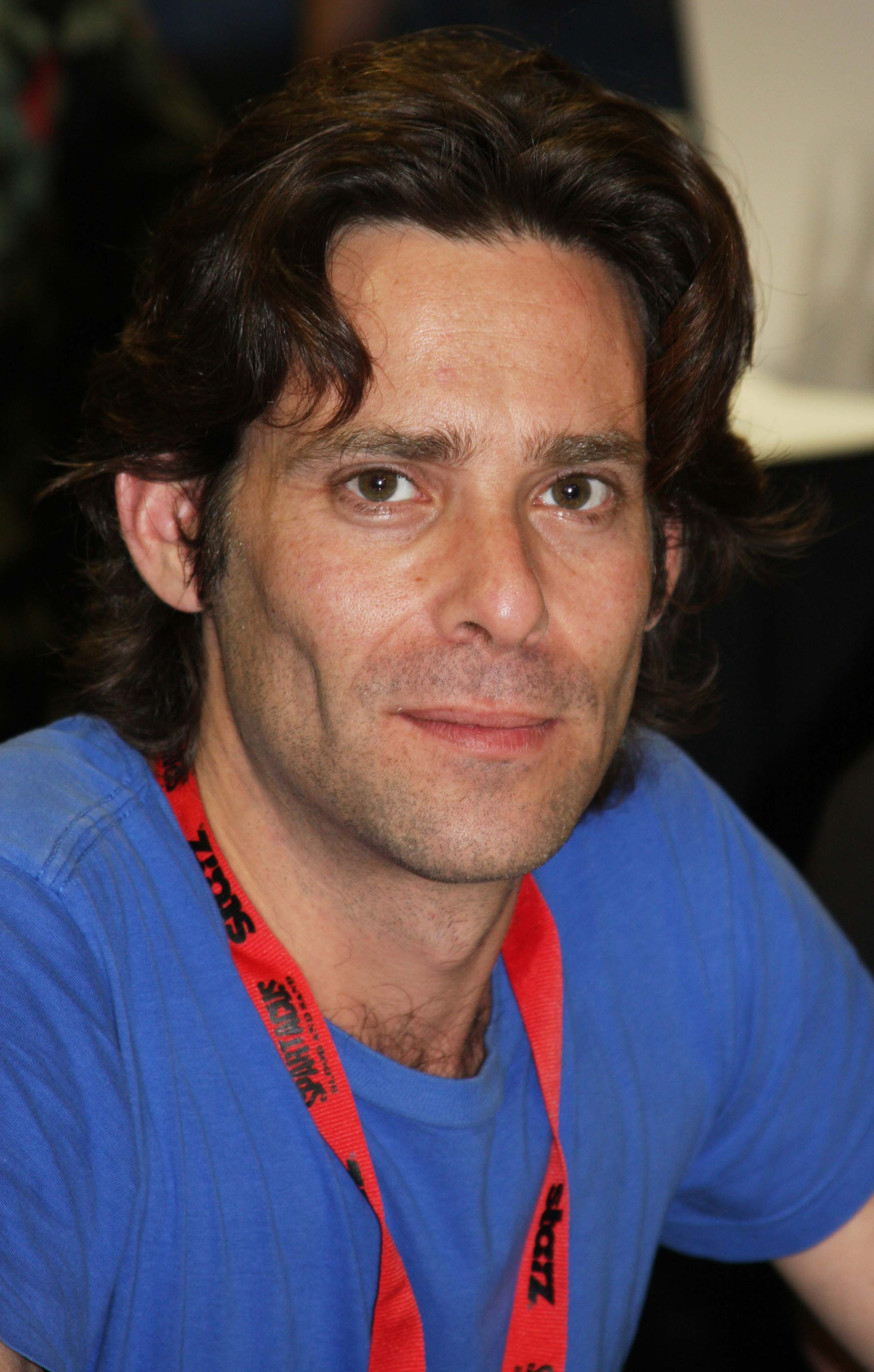
Callis at the 2009 San Diego Comic-Con

Callis went on to attend the London Academy of Music and Dramatic Art, from which he graduated in 1996. In the same year, he was awarded the Jack Tinker Award (Theatre Record Critic of the Year) for Most Promising Newcomer for his performance in Old Wicked Songs, a two-hander by Jon Marans, in which he starred alongside Bob Hoskins.

Callis has appeared in various West End productions and television series as well as on radio. He has also been involved in writing and directing. His directorial debut was Beginner's Luck, a co-production of his and writer/director Nick Cohen's Late Night Pictures and Angel Eye Film & TV, starring Julie Delpy, Steven Berkoff and Fenella Fielding. Beginner's Luck was critically panned, but ran for almost three weeks on one print (all the low-budget film could afford) in one cinema in central London, then went on a tour of student cinemas around the UK.

Callis finished filming his first role in a cinema film, Bridget Jones's Diary, alongside Renée Zellweger and Hugh Grant, in the summer of 2000 and between a few further film and TV roles went back on stage in the Soho Theatre in December 2002.

In 2003, Callis played the role of Dr. Gaius Baltar in the re-imagined Battlestar Galactica miniseries and continued the role in the regular series that followed. In 2006, Callis won the Best Supporting Actor Saturn Award and an AFI award for his performance as Baltar.

== Filmography ==
=== Film ===
Year	Title	Role	Notes
1997	Weekend Bird	Mike	Short film
1999	Surety	Ben	Short film; Also director and producer
2001	Bridget Jones's Diary	Tom	
2001	Beginner's Luck	Mark Feinman	Also co-director, co-producer and writer
2004	Bridget Jones: The Edge of Reason	Tom	
2004	Dead Cool	Josh	
2006	One Night with the King	Haman, the Agagite	
2010	Reuniting the Rubins	Danny Rubins	
2010	Meet Pursuit Delange	Pursuit	Short film
2013	Austenland	Colonel Andrews	
2013	Believe	Man in Mac	
2016	The Hollow	Vaughn Killinger	
2016	Bridget Jones's Baby	Tom	
2017	House by the Lake	Scott	
2025	Bridget Jones: Mad About the Boy	Tom	

=== Television ===
Year	Title	Role	Notes
1996	Murder Most Horrid	Mark	Episode: "Confess"
1996	Soldier Soldier	Maj Tim Forrester	9 episodes
1997	A Dance to the Music of Time	Gwinnett	Episode: "Post War"
1998	Heat of the Sun	Asst. Supt. Clive Lanyard	Episode: "Private Lives"
1998	The Ruth Rendell Mysteries	Guy Curran	Episodes: "Going Wrong: Part 1", "Going Wrong: Part 2" and "Going Wrong: Part 3"
1999	Sex, Chips & Rock n' Roll	The Wolf	Miniseries
1999	The Scarlet Pimpernel	Henri	Episode: "Valentin Gautier"
2000	Arabian Nights	Prince Ahmed	Miniseries
2000	Jason and the Argonauts	Aspyrtes	Miniseries
2001	As If	Sebastian	Episode: "Nicki's POV"
2001	Victoria & Albert	Ernest of Saxe-Coburg-Gotha	Television film
2002	Relic Hunter	Raoul	Episode: "Faux Fox"
2003	Helen of Troy	Menelaus	Miniseries
2003	Battlestar Galactica	Dr. Gaius Baltar	Miniseries
2003	Blue Dove	Dominic Pasco	Miniseries
2004–2010	Battlestar Galactica	Dr. Gaius Baltar	Main role; 73 episodes
2007	Battlestar Galactica: Razor	Dr. Gaius Baltar	Television film
2008	Late Show with David Letterman	Gaius Baltar / Top Ten Presenter	Uncredited
2009	Merlin and the Book of Beasts	Merlin	Television film
2009	Numb3rs	Mason Duryea	Episode: "Angels and Devils"
2010	FlashForward	Gabriel McDow	Episodes: "The Garden of Forking Paths", "Goodbye Yellow Brick Road", "Course Correction" and "The Negotiation"
2010–2012	Eureka	Dr. Trevor Grant	10 episodes
2011	Merlin	Julius Borden	Episode: "Aithusa"
2011	17th Precinct	Jeff Bosson	TV pilot
2012	Portlandia	Himself	Episode: "One Moore Episode"
2012	Midsomer Murders	Toby & Julian DeQuetteville	Episode: "The Dark Rider"
2012	DCI Banks	Owen Pierce	Episodes: "Innocent Graves – Part 1" and "Innocent Graves – Part 2"
2013	Arrow	The Dodger	Episode: "Dodger"
2013	Key & Peele	Shakespeare	Episode #3.8
2013–2014	CSI: Crime Scene Investigation	John Merchiston	Episodes: "Skin in the Game", "The Devil and D.B. Russell" and "Boston Brakes"
2014	Matador	Lucien Sayer	6 episodes
2014–2016	The Musketeers	Emile Bonnaire	Episodes: "Commodities" and "The Queen's Diamonds"
2015	A.D. The Bible Continues	Herod Antipas	Miniseries
2015	Gallipoli	Ellis Ashmead-Bartlett	Miniseries
2015	Rick and Morty	Pat Gueterman (voice)	Episode: "The Wedding Squanchers"
2017–2021	Castlevania	Alucard (voice)	27 episodes
2017–2018	12 Monkeys	Athan Cole / The Witness	5 episodes
2017	Once Upon a Date	Ed Holland	Television film
2019	Kevin Hart's Guide to Black History	President Lincoln / Confederate Captain	Television film
2019–2022	Blood & Treasure	Simon Hardwick / Karim Farouk	Main cast
2020	MacGyver	The Merchant	Episodes: "Soccer + Desi + Merchant + Titan" and "Psy-Op + Cell + Merchant + Birds"
2022	Star Trek: Picard	Maurice Picard	Episodes: "Monsters" and "Hide And Seek"
2022-present	Slow Horses	Claude Whelan	12 episodes
2023–present	Castlevania: Nocturne	Alucard (voice)	9 episodes

=== Radio ===
Year	Title	Role	Notes
1997	Daisy Miller	Winterbourne	
1997	HMS Ulysses	Kid Carpenter	Radio 4 Saturday Playhouse

=== Web ===
Year	Title	Role	Notes
2014	Caper	Doc English	Through Geek and Sundry
