= Beginner's Luck (2001 film) =

2001 film by James Callis and Nick Cohen

- Directed by: James Callis; Nick Cohen
- Written by: James Callis; Nick Cohen
- Starring: Julie Delpy; Steven Berkoff; Christopher Cazenove; Fenella Fielding
- Distributed by: Guerilla Films
- Release dates: 18 November 2001 (London Film Festival); 21 June 2002
- Running time: 84 minutes
- Country: United Kingdom
- Language: English

Beginner's Luck is a 2001 British drama film directed by James Callis and Nick Cohen and starring Julie Delpy, Steven Berkoff, Christopher Cazenove, Fenella Fielding and Jean-Yves Berteloot.

== Cast ==
- Julie Delpy - Anya
- Steven Berkoff - Bob
- Christopher Cazenove - Andrew Fontaine
- Fenella Fielding - Aunt Emily
- Jean-Yves Berteloot - Javaad
- James Callis - Mark
- Sacha Grunpeter (credited as Tom Redhill) - Jason Keritos
- Rosanna Lowe - Hettie Burton
