= Martin Cole (actor) =

British actor

Martin Cole is a British actor who began his career early as a child growing up in Cardiff, Wales. His first television role was at the age of 11, playing in Sudz on ITV. By the time he reached college (Coleg Glan Hafren), where he studied performing arts, he had already played lead roles in award-winning theatre productions and worked in television and radio.

Whilst still at college Martin became a member of Welsh rap group. They had success in the UK charts before breaking up in 1995.

In 1995 Martin moved to London to continue pursuing his acting career. Ironically his first big break came in 1997 when he went back to Wales to shoot the BBC Wales drama series "Tiger Bay". One year later Martin made his Professional London stage debut in the Roy Williams multi-award-winning play Starstruck. As the lead character Dennis, Martin shone and his performance and the play received critical acclaim.

Within a couple of years Martin became a familiar face on British television. Appearing in many shows including Casualty, Spooks, Dream Team, Red Cap, Holby City and the cult Sky One show "Mile High". He also appeared in movies, including: "Buffalo Soldiers" (2001), with Joaquin Phoenix and "Dead Cool" (2004), as the lover of Rosanna Arquette.

In 2005 Martin moved to Los Angeles and started working as the host on various TV shows including: Hollywood Headlines, Hollywood Headlines, Movie Music, Soundtrack News, Hollywood Buzz, Word for Word and 350 degrees.
