= Idyia =

Oceanid of Greek mythology, spouse of Aeetes

In Greek mythology, Idyia (Ancient Greek: Ἰδυῖα, romanized: Idyîa) or Eidyia (Ancient Greek: Εἰδυῖα, romanized: Eidyîa; /aɪˈdaɪ.ə/) was a daughter of the Titans Oceanus and Tethys, and queen to Aeëtes, king of Colchis. She was the mother of Medea, Chalciope and Absyrtus. According to Apollonius of Rhodes, she was the youngest of the Oceanides. Her name means "the fair-faced" or "the knowing one" derived from the Greek word εἴδω (eídō) meaning "to see" or "to know".
