= Medus =

Greek mythological figure

- Prince of Athens
- Member of the Athenian Royal Family
- Other names: Medeus, Polyxenus
- Abode: Athens, then Colchis

Genealogy
- Parents: Aegeus or Jason (father); Medea (mother)
- Siblings: Eriopis, Theseus

In Greek mythology, Medus (Ancient Greek: Μῆδος, romanized: Mēdos, lit. 'guardian' or 'protector'), also Medeus or Medeius (Μήδειος, Mḗdeios, lit. 'son of Medea', 'from Media', 'Median' or 'appertaining to the Medes'), was an Athenian prince as the son of King Aegeus, thus a half-brother of the hero Theseus. In some sources, he is the son of Jason.

== Family ==
Medus's mother was the Colchian witch Medea, daughter of King Aeëtes. In some accounts, he was called Polyxenus and his father was Jason, thus a brother of Eriopis.

== Mythology ==
=== Childhood ===
In the account for being the son of Jason, Medeus was raised by the centaur Chiron in the mountains.

=== Flight from Athens ===
As the son of Aegeus, Medus and his mother were driven as fugitives from Athens after Medea plotted against Theseus. Following his mother, Medus was brought by a storm to the court of King Perses of Colchis and Medus was seized by the guards and presented to the current ruler. This Perses was the son of Helios and the brother of the former king Aeëtes. He ruled after the death of his brother but by some accounts, Aeëtes was murdered or deposed by Perses. When Medus saw that he had come into the power of his enemy, he falsely asserted he was Hippotes, son of King Creon of Corinth. Perses carefully investigated and ordered him to be cast into prison to protect his throne from any potential claimants because he feared the prophecy that he should be aware of Aeëtes' descendants (i.e. Medus). Afterwards, sterility and scarcity of crops are said to have occurred.

=== Medea's scheme ===
When Medea came back to her native land in her chariot with the yoked dragons, she falsely impersonated a priestess of Artemis before the king. She said she could make atonement for the plague to appease the gods and she heard from the king that a supposed Hippotes was held in custody. Thinking that the alleged Corinthian prince had come to avenge the injury to his father (i.e. Creon), Medea unknowingly conspired and betrayed her son Medus. For she persuaded the king that he was not Hippotes, but Medus, sent by his father to dispatch the king, and begged that he be handed over to her to be killed as a sacrifice, convinced that he was Hippotes. So when Medus was brought out to pay for his deceit by death, Medea saw that things were otherwise than she had thought, she said she wished to talk with him which Perses agreed. Subsequently, Medea gave Medus a sword and bade him avenge the wrongs to his grandfather Aeëtes, and Medus killed Perses, and gained his grandfather's kingdom. In some accounts, the king was stabbed to death by Medea herself using the sacrificial blade. Another version of the myth states that Medea restored her father Aeëtes to the throne of Colchis after being deposed by Perses.

=== Aftermath ===
When Medus came to rule, he secured the command of an army and advanced over a large part of Asia which lies above the Pontus. Conquering the barbarians that live in that neighboring land, he named Media in honor of either himself or his mother. Medeus was also credited to be the founder of Meda in Ecbatana. Medus met his death while marching against the Indians.

Regnal titles
Preceded by Perses	King of Colchis	Succeeded by ?

== See also ==
- Madai
- Medes
- Mordred
