= Neophron =

Ancient Greek dramatist

Neophron of Sicyon (Νεόφρων, -ονος) was one of the most prolific of the ancient Greek dramatists, to whom are accredited one hundred and twenty pieces, of which only a few fragments of his Medea remain. This, it is said, Euripides used in his tragedy which bears the same title, although modern scholarship is divided on which tragedy came first. Neophron likely lived in the second half of the fifth century B.C. and was a rough contemporary of Euripides.

According to the Suda, he introduced in his plays the torture of slaves, such scenes, according to the canons of dramatic art, not being enacted on the stage, but merely referred to by messengers.

== Sources ==
- This article is based on text from The Drama: Its History, Literature and Influence on Civilization, vol. 1. ed. Alfred Bates. London: Historical Publishing Company, 1906.
