= Polyxenus =

Greek mythology - of the same name

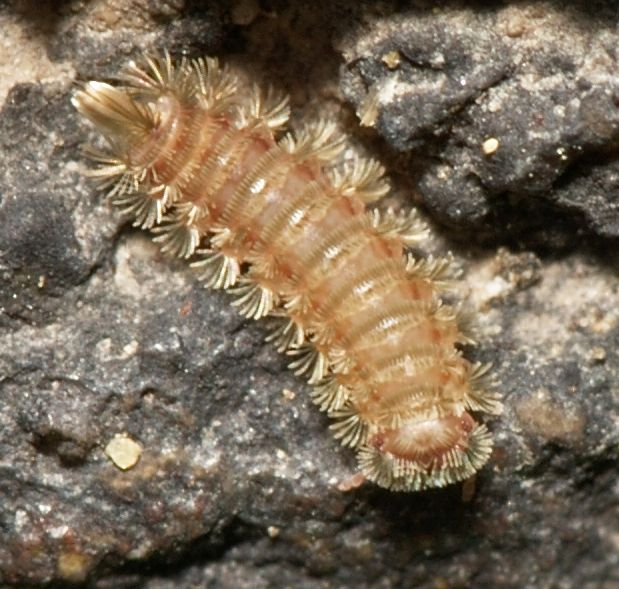
Polyxenus lagurus

In Greek mythology, Polyxenus or Polyxenos (/pəˈlɪksɪnəs/; Ancient Greek: Πολύξενος, romanized: Poluxenos), also Polyxeinus (Ancient Greek: Πολύξεινος, romanized: Poluxeinos, lit. 'entertaining many guests', 'very hospitable' or 'welcoming many strangers'), was a name that may refer to:

- Polyxenus, one of the first priests of Demeter and one of the first to learn the secrets of the Eleusinian Mysteries.
- Polyxenus, king of Elis, and son of Agasthenes and Peloris. He was counted among the suitors of Helen, and accordingly participated in the Trojan War, having brought 40 ships with him. He returned home safely after the war, and had a son Amphimachus, whom he possibly named after his friend Amphimachus (son of Cteatus), who had died at Troy.
- Polyxenus, king of Elis, was said to have been entrusted with the stolen cattle by the Taphians under Pterelaus; the cattle was ransomed from him by Amphitryon. This Polyxenus, however, appears to be a figure distinct from Polyxenus, son of Agasthenes, since he lived two generations before the Trojan War.
- Polyxenus, also called Medus, son of the hero Jason and the Colchian sorceress Medea, the daughter of King Aeëtes. He was the brother of Eriopis.
