= Mermerus and Pheres =

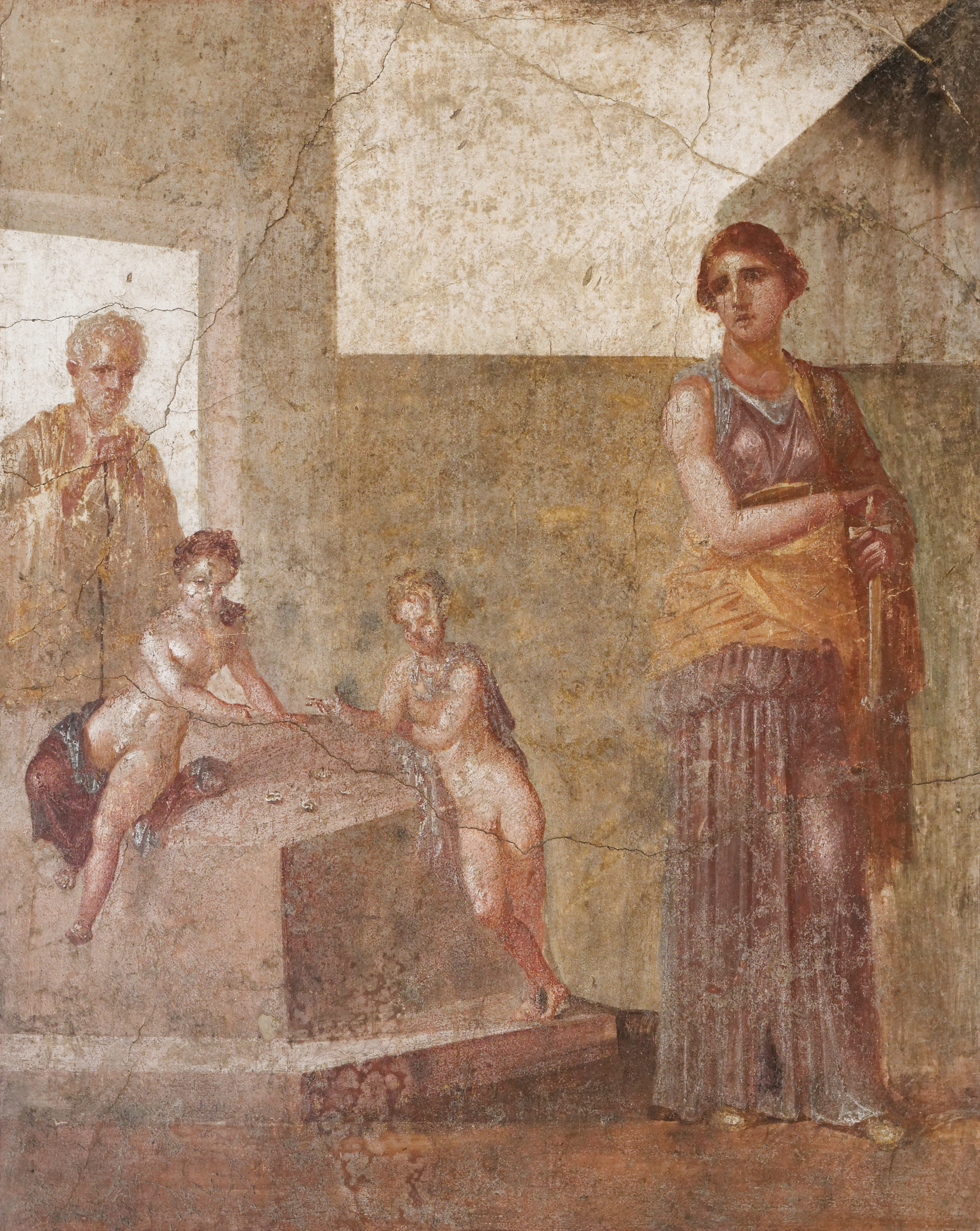
Medea and her children, fresco from the House of the Dioscuri in Pompeii, 1st century AD.

In Greek mythology, Mermerus (Ancient Greek: Μέρμερος, romanized: Mérmeros) and Pheres (Ancient Greek: Φέρης, romanized: Phéres or Phérēs) were the sons of Jason and Medea. They were killed either by the Corinthians or by Medea, for reasons that vary depending on the rendition. In one account, Mermerus was killed by a lioness while hunting.

In one account, Pheres has a son who was also called Mermerus who fathered Ilus — the host of Odysseus and skilled in the art of preparing poison as recounted in Homer's Odyssey.
