= Absyrtus =

In Greek mythology, a Colchian prince

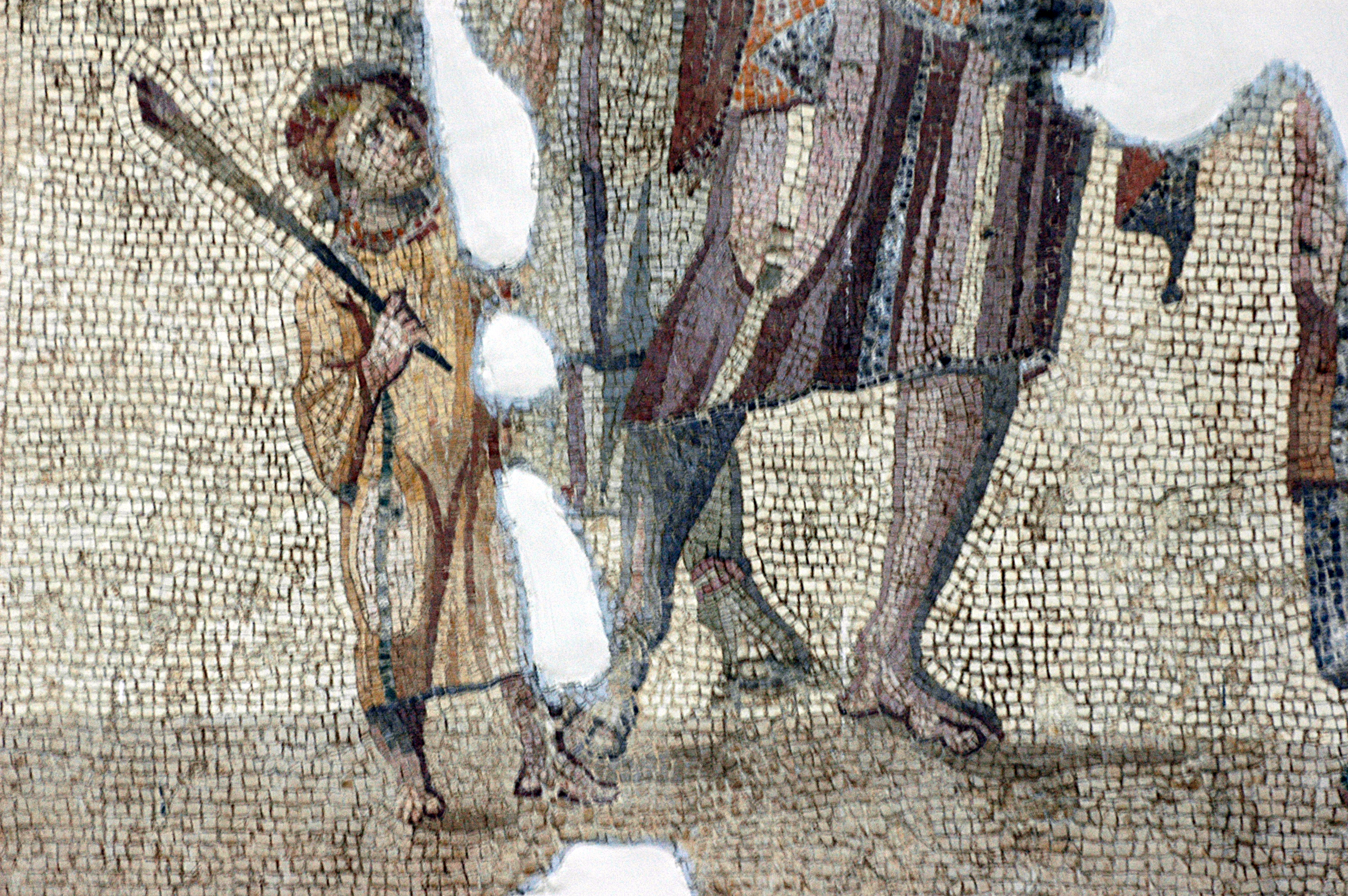
Absyrtus as a young child from a Roman mosaic in Antioch.

In Greek mythology, Absyrtus (Ancient Greek: Ἄψυρτος) or Apsyrtus Ancient Greek: Άψυρτος) was a Colchian prince and brother or half-brother of Medea. He was involved in Jason's escape with the Golden Fleece from Colchis.

The Absyrtides were named after him.

== Family ==
Absyrtus was the son of Aeëtes, king of Colchis and a brother of Medea and Chalciope. His mother is variously given: Hyginus calls her Ipsia, Hesiod and the Bibliotheca call her Idyia, Apollonius calls her Asterodeia, a Caucasian Oceanid and others Hecate (described as a mortal granddaughter of Helios rather than as the goddess), the Nereid Neaera or Eurylyte.

A tradition followed by Pacuvius, Justin, and Diodorus provided Aegialeus as the name of the son of Aeëtes who was murdered by Medea. Absyrtus was also called Phaethon by the sons of the Colchians because he outshone all the youths.

Comparative table of Absyrtus' family
Relation	Name	Source																	
Relation	Name	Hesiod	Naupa.	Soph.	Apollonius		Pacu.	Diod.	Cic.	Valer.	Strabo	Pliny	Apollod.	Hyginus		Lucian	Aelian	Justin	Orph.
Relation	Name	Theog.	Naupa.	Scyth.	Argo.	Sch.	Pacu.	Diod.	Cic.	Valer.	Strabo	Pliny	Apollod.	Fab.	Sch.	De Salt.	Aelian	Justin	Argo.
Relation	Absyrtus				✓	✓			✓	✓			✓	✓	✓	✓			✓
Relation	Aegialeus						✓	✓	✓									✓	
Relation	Apsyrtus										✓						✓		
Parentage	Aeetes and Eurylyte		✓			✓													
Parentage	Aeetes and Neaera			✓		✓													
Parentage	Aeetes and Asterodeia				✓														
Parentage	Aeetes and Hecate					✓		✓											
Parentage	Aeetes and Idyia	✓							✓				✓						
Parentage	Aeetes and Ipsia														✓				
Parentage	Aeetes									✓	✓			✓			✓		
Siblings	Medea			✓	✓	✓		✓	✓	✓	✓	✓	✓	✓			✓		✓
Siblings	Chalciope				✓					✓			✓	✓					✓
Siblings								✓											

== Mythology ==
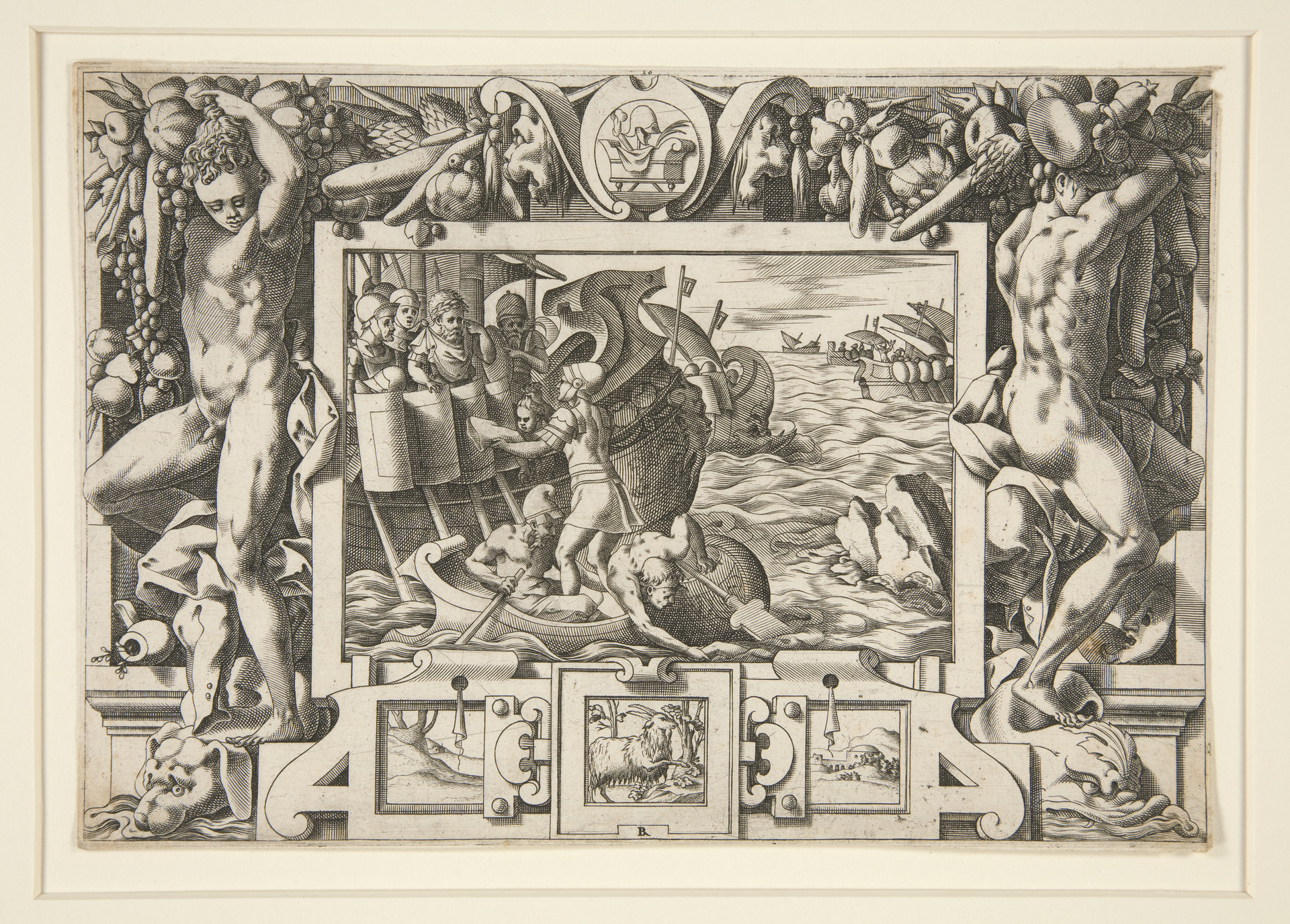
"Aeetes Accepts the Dismembered Corpse of Absyrte". Engraved by René Boyvin after Leonard Thiry, 1563.

=== Early years ===
As a descendant of Helios, Apsyrtus grew into a radiant young man and lived in his own palace, next to the loftiest building where his father, the queen and his other sisters dwelt. This can be explained by the fact that Apsyrtus was born to a Caucasian nymph, Asterodeia, to Aeetes before he made Eidyia, the youngest daughter of Tethys and Oceanus, his wedded wife. Because his grandfather, Helios, had once betrayed Ares to the other gods for being the lover of the beautiful Aphrodite, the love-goddess was extremely hostile to the descendants of Helios and none of them would experience a happy love life.

=== Civil war ===
Later on, a civil war in Colchis occurred because the brother of Aeëtes, Perses, came with a Scythian army to the country in order to unseat the king out off his throne. Aeetes was aided by the Argonauts because he vowed to give the Golden Fleece to Jason in return of the favor for the incoming fight.

During the battle, Apsyrtus went to the front line and wore a beautiful golden armor. He drove the golden cart of his grandfather Helios while his golden shield reflected the rays of the sun. He had a quivering spear and a threatening, gleaming helm that no one of the common people could gaze at without getting pain in their eyes. When he pursued his opponents in battle, they fled from fear and he ran over them with his horses. Groaning, the trampled warriors remained in the dust and wondered anxiously what had happened to them. Finally, Aeetes with the help of the Minyans won the war and managed to chase away his brother.

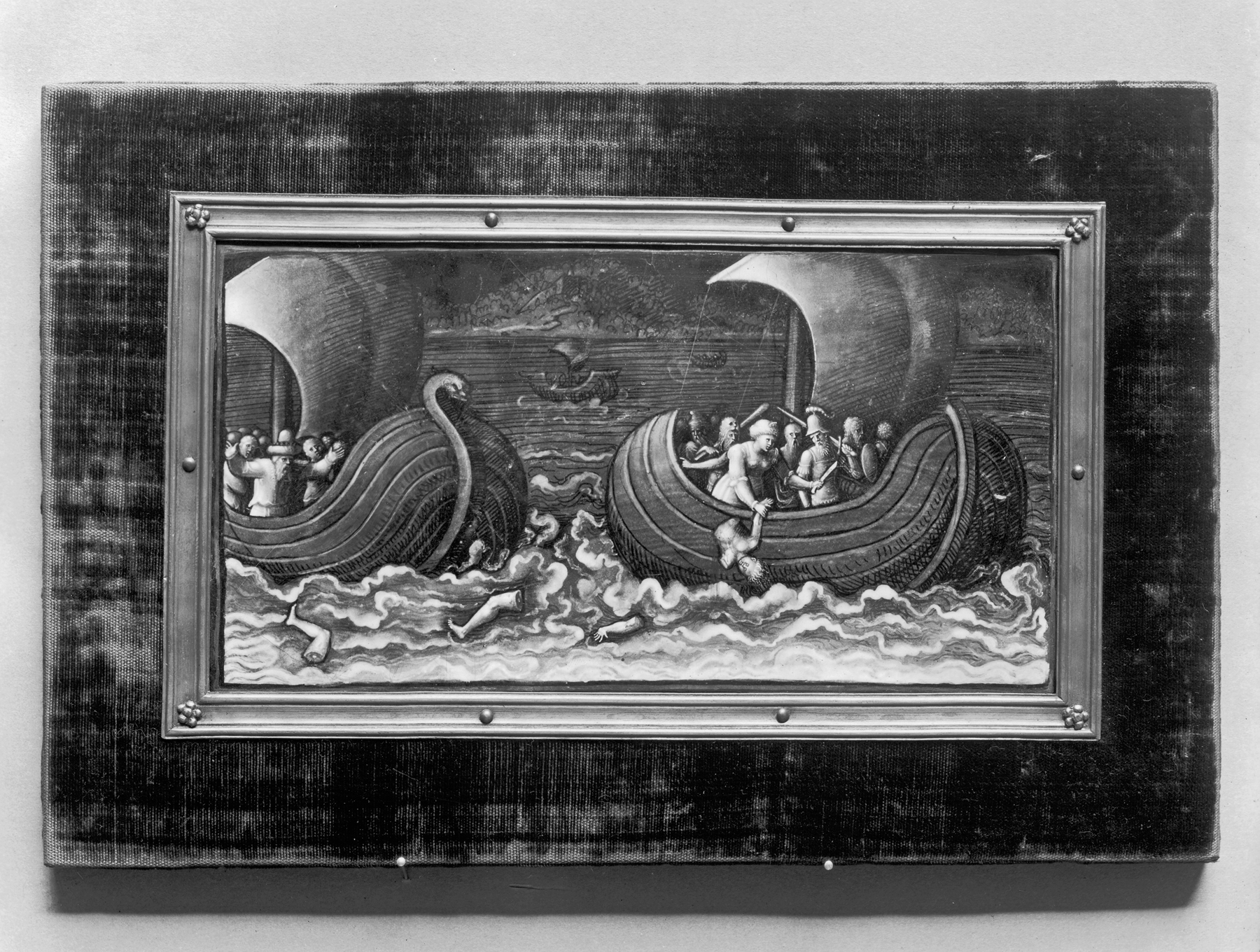
Plaque with Medea's Murder of Absyrtus by Martin Didier Pape (between 1580 and 1600)

=== Unexpected departure ===
When Medea fled with Jason, she took her brother Absyrtus with her, and when she was nearly overtaken by her father, she murdered her brother, cut his body into pieces and strewed them on the road, so that her father might thus be delayed by gathering the limbs of his child. Tomi, the place where this occurred, was believed to have derived its name from temno (τέμνω, "cut").

According to another tradition, Absyrtus was not taken by Medea, but was sent out by his father in pursuit of her. He overtook her in Corcyra, where she had been kindly received by King Alcinous, who refused to surrender her to Absyrtus. When he overtook her a second time in the island of Minerva, he was slain by Jason. Apollonius of Rhodes presents a variation on this tradition in Argonautica (Book 4): Jason murdered Medea's brother on one of the "Brygean Islands" (an island sacred to the goddess Artemis and located in the modern Kvarner Gulf), where he was lured by Medea with false promises – their first (and last) meeting after leaving Colchis.

== Sources ==
- Apollodorus, Apollodorus, The Library, with an English Translation by Sir James George Frazer, F.B.A., F.R.S. in 2 Volumes. Cambridge, Massachusetts, Harvard University Press; London, William Heinemann Ltd. 1921. Online version at the Perseus Digital Library.
- Apollonius Rhodius, Argonautica translated by Robert Cooper Seaton (1853-1915), R. C. Loeb Classical Library Volume 001. London, William Heinemann Ltd, 1912. Online version at the Topos Text Project.
- Cicero, Nature of the Gods from the Treatises of M.T. Cicero translated by Charles Duke Yonge (1812-1891), Bohn edition of 1878. Online version at the Topos Text Project.
- Diodorus Siculus, Diodorus Siculus: The Library of History. Translated by Charles Henry Oldfather. Twelve volumes. Loeb Classical Library. Cambridge, Massachusetts: Harvard University Press; London: William Heinemann, Ltd. 1989. Vol. 3. Books 4.59–8. Online version at Bill Thayer's Web Site
- Hyginus, Fabulae from The Myths of Hyginus translated and edited by Mary Grant. University of Kansas Publications in Humanistic Studies. Online version at the Topos Text Project.
- Valerius Flaccus, Argonautica translated by Mozley, J H. Loeb Classical Library Volume 286. Cambridge, MA, Harvard University Press; London, William Heinemann Ltd. 1928. Online version at theio.com.
