= If I Had You (film) =

British Crime Drama

- Genre: Crime drama
- Written by: Caleb Ranson
- Directed by: John Deery
- Starring: Sarah Parish; Poppy Miller; Paul McGann; Mark Benton; Andrew Buchan
- Theme music composer: Dominik Scherrer
- Country of origin: United Kingdom
- Original language: English
- No. of episodes: 1

Production
- Executive producers: Michele Buck; Damien Timmer
- Producer: Karen Thrussell
- Cinematography: John Daly
- Editor: Jackie Ophir
- Running time: 120 minutes
- Production company: Granada Television

Original release
- Network: ITV
- Release: 7 May 2006

If I Had You is a one-off British crime drama television film, starring Sarah Parish, Poppy Miller, and Paul McGann. Parish stars as police detective Sharon Myers, who moves from the big city back to her small hometown to investigate a murder. If I Had You was first broadcast on 7 May 2006 on ITV. It was also broadcast in the United States on BBC America on 25 July 2006. Future member of One Direction, Louis Tomlinson, makes a short appearance as a member of a group of boys who discover a body in the river.

== Cast ==
- Sarah Parish as D.I. Sharon Myers
- Paul McGann as Phillip Andrews
- Poppy Miller as Helen Andrews
- Amy Beth Hayes as Lesley Tenant
- Mark Benton as D.S. Harry Fielding
- Andrew Buchan as D.C. Marcus Watson
- Sakuntala Ramanee as the Pathologist
- Louis Tomlinson as boy discovering body (uncredited)

== Plot ==
Sharon Myers (Sarah Parish) unexpectedly turns up at a school reunion party being held in her birthplace of Luckwell, twenty years after leaving the village. She has returned to her hometown to take up the position of Detective Inspector, after recently being promoted. She bumps into her childhood best friend, Helen Andrews (Poppy Miller), who is heavily pregnant, and attending the party with her current husband, Phillip (Paul McGann). Helen is unaware that Sharon and Phillip know each other, and that they had an affair shortly before she discovered she was pregnant. During the party, Sharon notices that Phillip is making eyes at new schoolteacher Lesley Tenant (Nicole Lewis). The following morning, Sharon is given an early wakeup call by D.S. Harry Fielding (Mark Benton), who informs her that a body has been found in a nearby lake. Sharon arrives at the scene to discover the body is none other than Lesley Tenant. Initial reports suggest that she was stabbed to death, and that her handbag, mobile phone and necklace have all been stolen. Suspicion initially falls on Phillip, but Sharon is quick to dissuade the idea that he could be the killer.

Phillip is arrested, but after an initial round of questioning, he is released without charge. Meanwhile, D.C. Marcus Watson (Andrew Buchan) discovers that only three necklaces of the kind Lesley was wearing have been bought locally in the past six months, one of which was purchased by a cash-buying customer, who matches Phillip's description. After a series of e-mails are discovered on Lesley's hard drive, signed "Love from P", Harry is determined to haul Phillip in again, but Sharon convinces him to bide his time, and instead look into one of Phillip's colleagues, Paul, who was in a relationship with Lesley up until six weeks before her death. Meanwhile, after being invited round for supper by Helen, Sharon goes in search of some old childhood photos in Helen's garage, and unexpectedly comes across Lesley's necklace, hidden inside a music box.

Sharon confronts Phillip, but he denies murdering Lesley. During their heated confrontation, Sharon's rage turns into lust, and the pair end up having sex. Sharon informs Phillip that she intends to protect him, whatever the cost. The next day, Harry and Marcus interview Paul, and he confirms that he was the one who sent the series of e-mails. Harry, however, informs Sharon that Paul denied all knowledge of the e-mails, and that in her absence, he has applied for a warrant to search Helen and Phillip's house. The search proves fruitless, but in order to disguise her loyalty to Phillip, Sharon orders a search of his workplace. During the search, Harry finds a tube of lipstick hidden behind a cabinet. The lipstick is sent for forensic analysis, and Phillip is re-arrested. However, once again, a lack of evidence leads to his subsequent release. When he is forced to explain his absence to Helen, the unduly stress causes her to collapse, and she is immediately taken to hospital. Later that night, Sharon meets with Phillip, unaware that Harry is watching her every move.

Early the next day, Sharon hauls Harry in after discovering he lied about who sent Lesley the illicit e-mails. In order to point suspicion in Harry's direction, she accuses him of holding a flame for Helen, and alleges that his grudge against Phillip is purely personal. Harry, however, fires back with the accusation that Sharon has been protecting Phillip and that he was witness to her meeting with him the previous night. Unwilling to show bias, Sharon questions Phillip once more, but when Phillip questions her about Lesley's necklace - which as far as her colleagues know, is still unaccounted for - Harry realises that Sharon hasn't been telling him the whole truth. Suspecting that Sharon may tamper with the DNA evidence found on the lipstick in Phillip's office, Harry asks the lab to contact him - and him only - with the results. As suspicion gradually begins to fall on Sharon, Phillip approaches Harry and warns him that he believes he is being framed. Harry and Phillip covertly break into Sharon's house, and they find Lesley's missing mobile phone and handbag.

Phillip suspects that Sharon is framing him in order to prove her ability to control, and to eventually end his relationship with Helen. Realising that Sharon has gone to pick Helen up from hospital, Harry telephones the hospital, but is told that Helen was discharged twenty minutes previously. Racing across town, they find Sharon and Helen down by the riverbank, engaged in a tussle on a jetty. Phillip suspects that Sharon is trying to kill Helen, just like she killed Lesley. During the tussle however, Sharon falls from the jetty and subsequently drowns, seemingly closing the case. Her death is recorded as accidental by the coroner, and the investigation into Lesley's murder is closed. Helen and Phillip's baby is born, and they subsequently hold a welcoming home party. During the party, Phillip goes to look for some firecrackers, and finds a piece of Lesley's jewellery in the garage. Phillip realises that Sharon is not the killer, and that Helen in fact murdered Lesley after witnessing them having sex on the night of the school reunion.
