= Eriopis =

List of characters of the same name in ancient Greek mythology

In Greek mythology, the name Eriopis (Ancient Greek: Ἐριῶπις) may refer to:

- Eriopis, 'with the lovely hair', the daughter of Apollo and Arsinoe (herself daughter of Leucippus), thus possibly a sister of Asclepius.
- Eriopis, the only daughter of the hero Jason and the Colchian sorceress Medea, the daughter of King Aeëtes. She was the sister of Medeus (also known as Polyxenus).
- Eriopis, mother of Ajax the Lesser by Oileus. Scholia on the Iliad inform that she was a daughter of Pheres and Clymene, and was also known as Eriope or Alcimache. Otherwise, the latter was the daughter of Phylax.
- Eriopis, consort of Anchises and mother by him of a daughter Hippodamia. According to Naevius, she escaped the sack of Troy with the wife of Aeneas by night.
