= Nick Cohen (filmmaker) =

British film director, producer and screenwriter

- Born: Nicholas Cohen; March 31, 1971 (age 55); Greenwich, London, United Kingdom
- Occupations: Film director, screenwriter, producer, actor
- Years active: 1997–present

Nick Cohen (occasionally credited as Nicholas Cohen) is a British film director, producer, actor and screenwriter known for writing and directing London Unplugged (2018), Recoil (2018), The Reeds (2010) and Beginner's Luck (2001) starring Steven Berkoff, Christopher Cazenove, and James Callis. His films have won awards and been featured in international film festivals. He has also directed a number of episodes of British soap operas EastEnders and Doctors.

Cohen also works in theatre, and was assistant director to the Royal Shakespeare Company World Tour in 1997, and staff director at the Royal National Theatre. He also founded Strange Fish Theatre which went on to produce several plays Off West End including Blood Knot at the Gate Theatre.

He wrote and starred in the autobiographical solo show Life with Oscar which ran Off West End in 2024.

== Career ==
Cohen trained as a stage actor with physical theatre companies, including Complicité. As an actor he played in Off West End roles such as the Clod Ensemble's Feast During the Plague at Battersea Arts Centre and The Boat Plays at the Gate Theatre, directed by David Farr.

In 1996 he wrote and directed a stage adaptation Margaret Atwood's Good Bones at the Southwark Playhouse for his theatre company Strange Fish Theatre. In 1997 he worked as assistant director to the Royal Shakespeare Company World Tour, and in 2000 became staff director at the Royal National Theatre with Trevor Nunn.

In 2018 Cohen collaborated with community groups, such as Four Corners Film, the Refugee Journalism Project and the Migrant Resource Centre, to produce and direct London Unplugged. Cohen conceived the project, and collaborated with a co-writer and a number of directors including Layke Anderson, who each directed a chapter of the anthology. It starred Juliet Stevenson and Bruce Payne. The Times awarded it 4 out of 5 stars and noted "Kew Gardens" (directed by Cohen) as especially distinctive.

At some point after directing Voodoo Lagoon (2006), Cohen moved from London to Hollywood, Los Angeles. His brief experience living there inspired the creation of his 2023 one-man show Life with Oscar.

Life with Oscar (2023) was a one-man show written and performed by Cohen, and originally directed by Nicholas Pitt. Advertised as "a darkly comic confessional rollercoaster ride through Hollywood based closely on real events," the show previewed at Camden People's Theatre in London before its premiere at the 2023 Edinburgh Festival Fringe, where it ran for four weeks at the Underbelly, Cowgate. Life with Oscar was met with positive reviews. Cohen's acting in particular was praised, and one reviewer called him "a comedic and theatrical genius."

A new version of the show, directed by Cressida Brown transferred to the Arcola Theatre in 2024 for a four-week run, and then toured internationally. It toured the United Kingdom in 2025.

== Filmography ==
Directing
Year	Title	Role	Notes
2001	Beginner's Luck	Director, Writer	Feature film co-written and co-directed with James Callis
2006	Voodoo Lagoon	Director, Writer	British Horror Film Festival: Best Supporting Actor Award (won), Jury Prize for Best Feature (nominated)
2007	EastEnders	Director	TV Series (4 episodes)
2007-2008	Doctors (2000 TV series)	Director	TV Series (15 episodes)
2010	The Reeds	Director	Neuchâtel International Fantastic Film Festival: Narcisse Award for Best Feature (nominated)
2015	The Wild Card	Director, Writer	Short film, co-written with Steven Blades
2018	London Unplugged	Director, Writer, Producer	Anthology feature co-written with Nick Hopkins

Screen Acting
Year	Title	Role	Type
1993	Equinox	The Lover	TV Series
2001	Beginner's Luck	Old Luvvie	Film
2012	The Bible in Vision	Reader	Video
