= Medea =

Daughter of King Aeëtes of Colchis in Greek mythology

- Princess and sorceress of Colchis
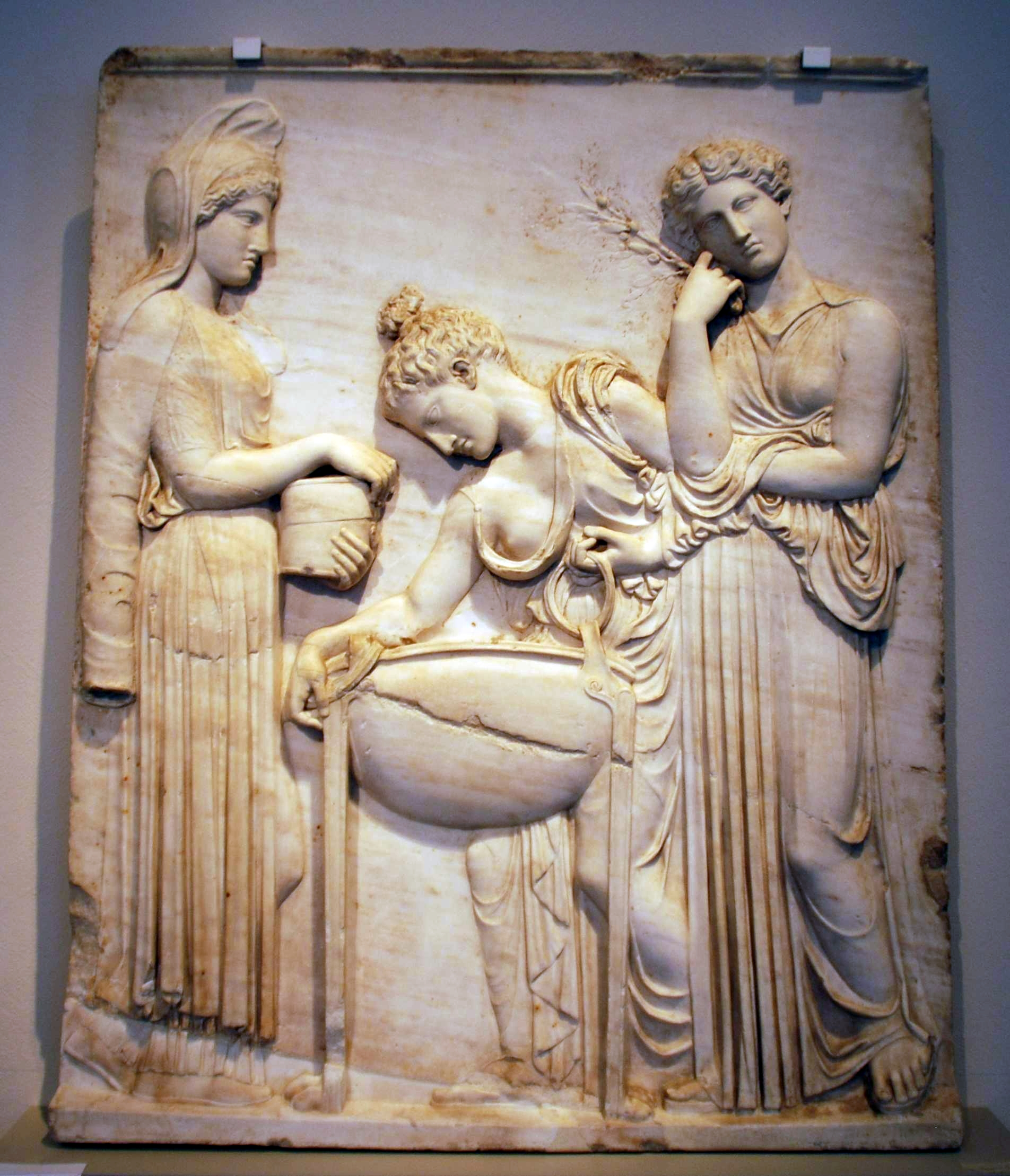
- Medea and the daughters of Pelias, 2nd-century Roman copy of a 420 BC original, Antikensammlung Berlin

Genealogy
- Parents: Aeëtes and Idyia
- Siblings: Absyrtus, Chalciope
- Consort: Jason, Aegeus
- Children: Vary according to tradition (names include twins Alcimedes and Thessalus, Tisander, Mermerus and Pheres, Eriopis, Medus)

In ancient Greek mythology, Medea (/mɪˈdiːə/; Ancient Greek: Μήδεια, romanized: Mḗdeia; lit. 'planner, schemer') is the daughter of King Aeëtes of Colchis. Medea is known in most stories as a sorceress, an accomplished pharmakís, a worker in pharmakeía (medicinal magic), and is often depicted as a high priestess of the goddess Hecate. She is a mythical granddaughter of the sun god Helios and a niece of Circe, an enchantress goddess. Her mother may have been Idyia.

She first appears in Hesiod's Theogony around 700 BC, but is best known from Euripides's 5th-century BC tragedy Medea and Apollonius of Rhodes's 3rd-century BC epic Argonautica. In the myth of the Argonauts, she aids Jason in his search for the Golden Fleece. Medea later marries him, but eventually kills their children and his other bride according to some versions of her story.

In the Argonautica, Medea plays the archetypal role of helper-maiden, aiding Jason in his search for the Golden Fleece, using her magic to save his life and killing her brother to allow Jason to escape. Once he finishes his quest, she abandons her native home of Colchis and flees westwards with Jason, where they eventually settle in Corinth and marry.

Euripides's Medea depicts the ending of her union with Jason, when after ten years of marriage, Jason intends to abandon her to wed King Creon's daughter Creusa. Medea is exiled from Corinth by Creon, and is offered refuge in Athens by King Aegeus after she offers to help him get an heir with her magic. In revenge against Jason, Medea murders her own sons and Jason's new bride with a poisoned crown and robes, so that Jason will be without heir and legacy for the rest of his life.

What happens afterwards varies according to several accounts. Herodotus in his Histories mentions that she ended up leaving Athens and settling in the Iranian plateau among the Aryans, who subsequently changed their name to the Medes.

== Genealogy and divinity ==
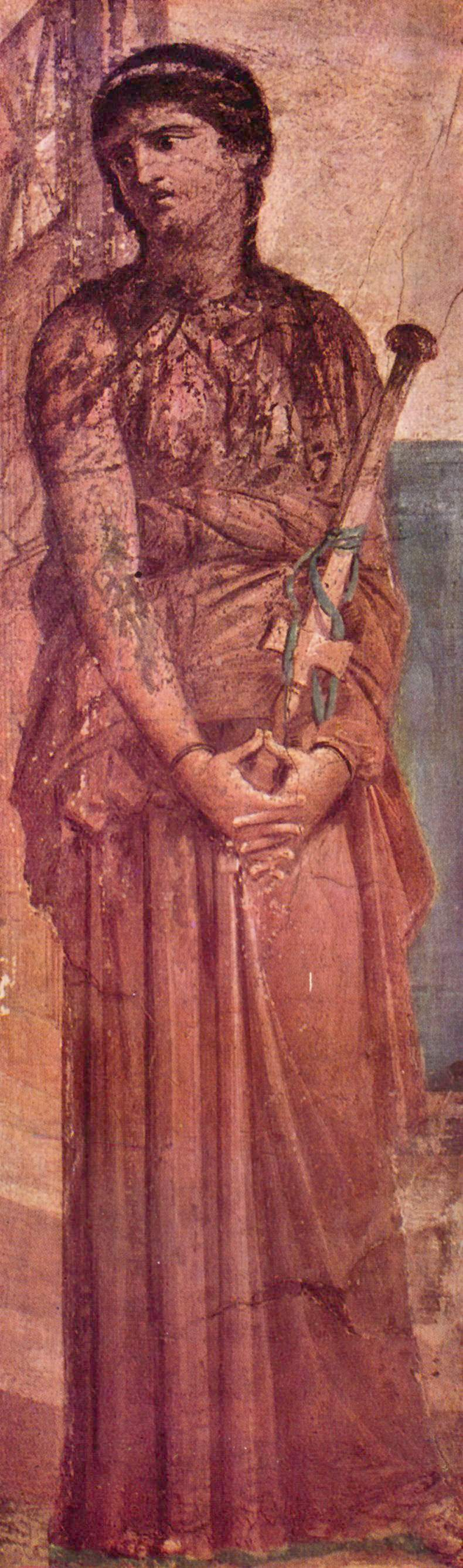
Medea in a c. 70 AD fresco from Herculaneum

Medea is a direct descendant of the sun god Helios (son of the Titan Hyperion and Titaness Theia) through her father King Aeëtes of Colchis. According to Hesiod (Theogony 956–962), Helios and the Oceanid Perseis produced two children, Circe and Aeëtes. Aeëtes then married the Oceanid Idyia and Medea was their child.

From here, Medea's family tree becomes more complicated and disputed. By some accounts, Aeëtes and Idyia only had two daughters, Medea and Chalciope (or Chalkiope), while Absyrtus (or Apsyrtus) was the son of Aeëtes through Asterodea, which would make him a half-brother to Medea herself. According to others, Idyia gave birth to Medea and Apsyrtus, while Asterodea gave birth to Chalciope. Even with the two differing accounts, it is known that Medea has a sister and a brother.

As she becomes older, Medea marries Jason and together they have children. The number and names of their children are questioned by scholars. Depending on the account, it is two to fourteen children. In his play, Medea, Euripides mentions two unnamed sons. According to other accounts, her children were "Mermerus, Pheres or Thessalus, Alcimedes and Tisander, and according to others, she had seven sons and seven daughters, while others mention only two children, Medus (some call him Polyxenus) and Eriopis, or one son Argos." Medea eventually leaves Jason in Corinth, and marries the King of Athens (Aegeus) and bears him a son. While with him, it is questioned if that was when she had her son Medeius, who goes on to become the ancestor of the Medes after winning their lands.

Understanding Medea's genealogy helps define her divinity. By some accounts, like the Argonautica, she is depicted as a young, mortal woman who is directly influenced by the Greek goddesses Hera and Aphrodite. While she possesses magical abilities, she is still a mortal with divine ancestry. Other accounts, like Euripides's Medea, focus on her mortality. Hesiod's Theogony places her marriage to Jason on the list of marriages between mortals and divine, suggesting that she is predominantly divine. She also has connections with Hecate, the goddess of magic, which could be one of the main sources from which she draws her magical ties. Although distinct from the Titan known as Perses, who is known for fathering Hecate, the goddess of witchcraft, Diodorus Siculus in his Bibliotheca historica made Perses of Colchis the father a priestess of Artemis named Hecate by an unknown mother; Perses's brother Aeëtes then married this Hecate and had Medea and Circe by her.

== Mythology ==
=== Jason and Medea ===
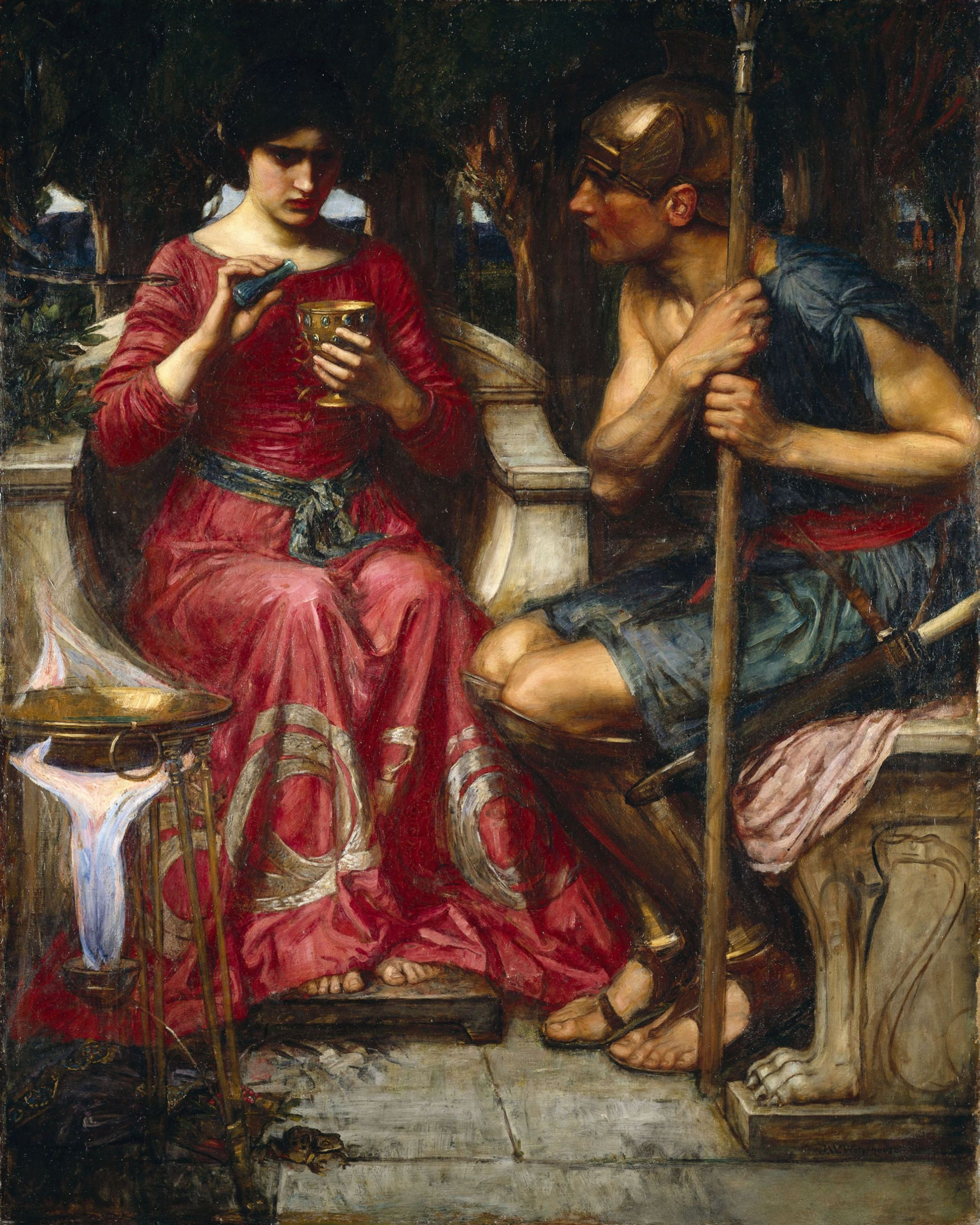
Jason and Medea by John William Waterhouse (1907)

Medea is introduced in Greek mythology after Jason came from Iolcus to Colchis in an attempt to claim his inheritance and throne by retrieving the Golden Fleece. In the most complete surviving account, the Argonautica of Apollonius of Rhodes, Hera convinces Aphrodite or Eros to cast a spell on Medea so that she will fall in love with Jason and promise her skills to help him. She does promise her skills on condition he agrees to marry her. Jason agrees, knowing Medea and her powers will help him in the long run. In a familiar mythic motif, Jason is promised the Golden Fleece through Aeëtes, but only if Jason completes a list of tasks. The first harrowing task is ploughing a field with fire-breathing oxen that Jason has to yoke himself. To aid him in this, Medea gives him an unguent, called the "Charm of Prometheus", to anoint himself and his weapons, to protect them from the bulls' fiery breath. After ploughing the field, Jason must sow the teeth of a dragon. This task seems straightforward, but Medea forewarns him that the teeth will spring into soldiers. She tells him to throw a rock into their midst to cause confusion among the soldiers. The soldiers, now confused, then begin to attack and kill each other instead of Jason. For the last task, Aeëtes assigns Jason to kill the sleepless dragon that guards the fleece. Medea aids Jason by putting the beast to sleep with her narcotic herbs. Once the dragon is asleep, Jason takes the fleece and sails away with Medea as promised. Medea distracts her father as they flee by killing her brother Absyrtus. Knowing that the Argonauts' journey back home will be perilous and deadly without divine intervention, Hera requests the help of Thetis. To convince the sea nymph, Hera tells Thetis of her deep love and affection for her, as she, Thetis, never gave in to Zeus's advances, no matter how strongly he felt towards the nymph. Hera also invokes Thetis's motherly love for her son Achilles, prophesying that the day will come when, in the Elysian Fields, "it is fated that he wed Medea, Aeëtes' daughter, there."

In some versions, Medea was said to have dismembered her brother's body and scattered his parts on an island, knowing her father would stop to retrieve them for proper burial; in other versions, it was Absyrtus himself who pursued them and was killed by Jason. However, in the Argonautica, Medea and Jason stopped on her aunt Circe's private isle of Aeaea so that she could be cleansed after murdering her brother, relieving her of blame for the deed. This is one of the times we see Medea use her powers. During the fight, the warrior-woman Atalanta (an Argonaut) was seriously wounded. Medea was able to use her powers to heal the wound.

On the way back to Thessaly, Medea prophesied that Euphemus, the helmsman of Jason's ship, the Argo, would one day rule over all of Libya. Pindar alleges that this came true through Battus, saying that he was a distant descendant of Euphemus (by 17 generations).

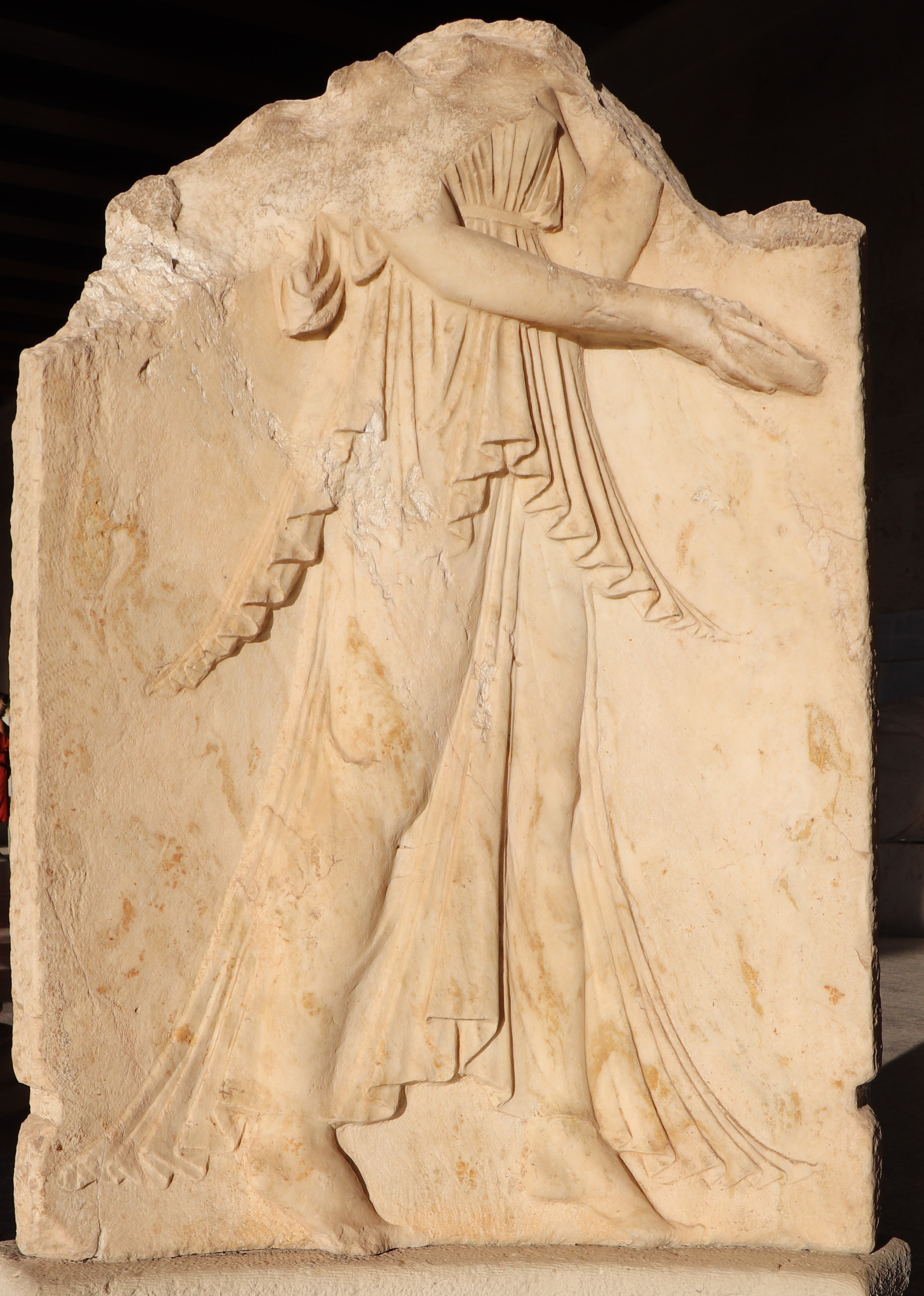
Bas relief of Medea, 2nd century BC, in the Ancient Agora Museum, Athens

After the prophecy, the Argo reached the island of Crete, guarded by the bronze man, Talos (Talus). Talos had one vein which went from his neck to his ankle, bound shut by a single bronze nail. According to Apollodorus, Talos was slain either when Medea drove him mad with drugs, deceived him that she would make him immortal by removing the nail, or was killed by Poeas's arrow. In the Argonautica, Medea hypnotized him from the Argo, driving him mad so that he dislodged the nail, ichor flowed from the wound, and he bled to death. After Talos died, the Argo landed.

At some point while in Thessaly, Medea and the Nereid Thetis (the future mother of Achilles) argued over which one was the most beautiful. They appointed the Cretan Idomeneus as the judge, who declared Thetis to be the most beautiful. In her anger, Medea called all Cretans liars, and cursed them to never say the truth.

Jason, celebrating his return with the Golden Fleece, noted that his father Aeson was too aged and infirm to participate in the celebrations. Medea understood the impact this had on Jason and was able to invigorate him by withdrawing the blood from Aeson's body, infused it with certain herbs, and returning it to his veins. The daughters of King Pelias saw this and asked Medea to perform the same service on their father and she agreed.

However, the service was never performed. Hera, who was angry at Pelias, conspired to make Jason fall in love with Medea, who, Hera hoped, would kill Pelias. Hera's plan worked, and the pair fell in love with each other. When they returned to Iolcus, Pelias refused to give up his throne to Jason who had been promised the throne in turn for the Golden Fleece. Medea then conspired to have Pelias's own daughters kill him. She demonstrated her powers to them by showing her cutting up an old ram and putting the pieces in stew. Once the pieces were in, Medea added some magic herbs and stirred the concoction, a young ram suddenly jumping out of the stew. Excited at the sight, the girls cut their father into pieces and threw him into a pot. Unfortunately, the King never came to life. Having killed Pelias, Jason and Medea fled to Corinth.

While in Corinth, the couple were married and lived together for 10 years. They had between one and fourteen children depending on the source. The known children are sons Alcimedes, Thessalus, Tisander, Mermeros and Pheres, Medus, and Argos, and a daughter, Eriopis. Medea ended a famine in Corinth by sacrificing to Demeter and the nymphs. Zeus then desired her, but she declined his advances in order not to incur Hera's wrath. As a reward, Hera offered to make her children immortal.

=== Various myth endings ===
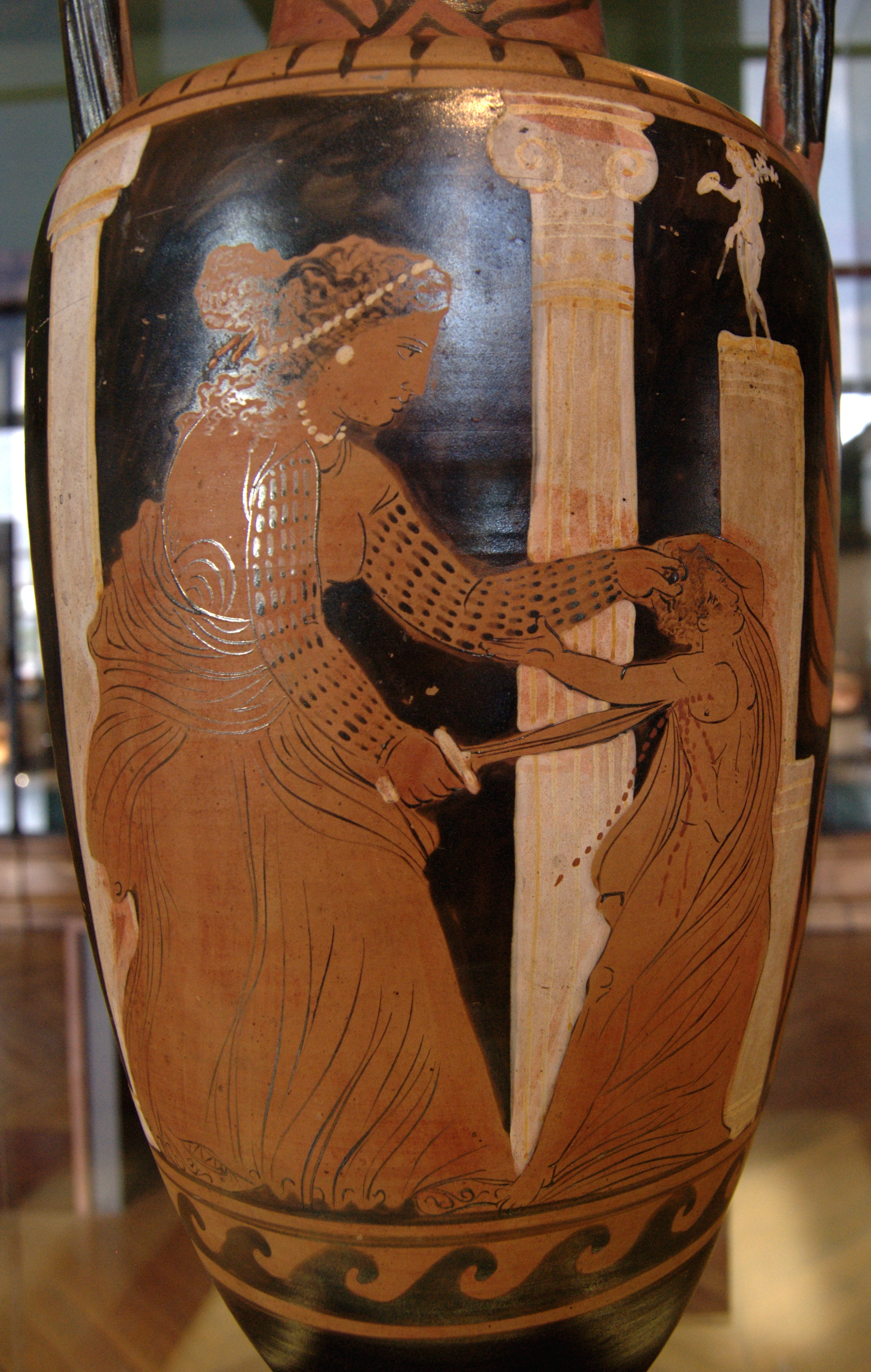
Medea murdering one of her children, neck amphora, c. 330 BC, Louvre

In Corinth, Jason abandoned Medea for the king Creon's daughter, Glauce (Creusa). Before the fifth century BC, there seem to have been two variants of the myth's conclusion. According to the poet Eumelus, to whom the fragmentary epic Korinthiaka is usually attributed, Medea killed her children by accident. She buried them alive in the Temple of Hera, believing this would make them immortal. The poet Creophylus, however, blamed their murders on the citizens of Corinth.

According to Euripides's Medea, she took her revenge on Glauce by sending her a dress and golden coronet, covered in poison. This resulted in the deaths of both the princess and the king, Creon, when he went to save his daughter. Medea then continued her revenge, murdering two of her children herself and refusing to allow Jason to hold the bodies. Afterward, she left Corinth and flew to Athens in a golden chariot driven by dragons sent by her grandfather, Helios, god of the sun.

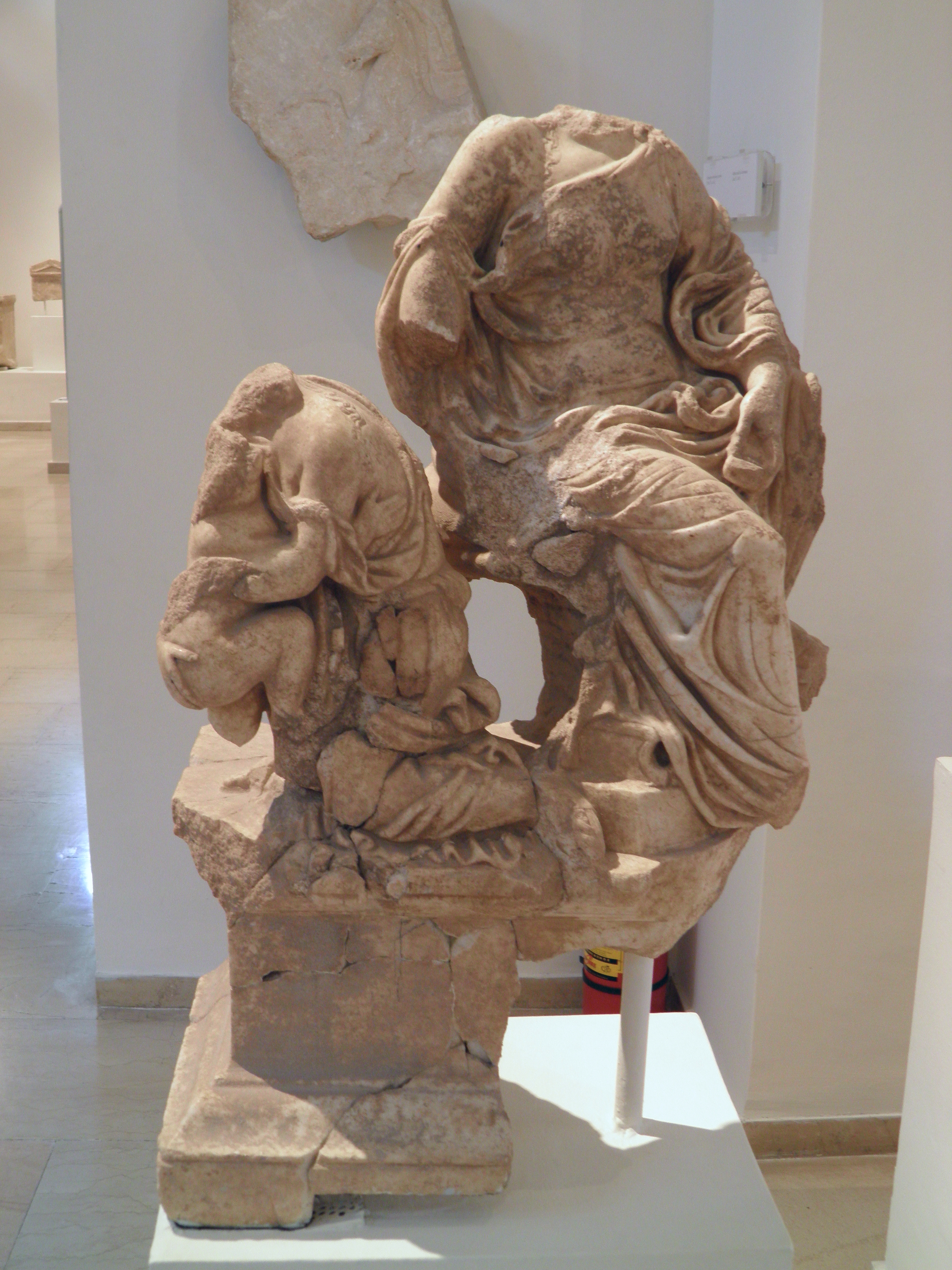
Statuette of Medea and a nurse protecting the child, Archaeological Museum of Dion, Greece

Although Jason in Euripides calls Medea most hateful to gods and men, the fact that the chariot is given to her by Helios indicates that she has the Gods on her side. As Bernard Knox points out, Medea's last scene parallels that of a number of indisputably divine beings in other plays by Euripides. Just like these gods, Medea "interrupts and puts a stop to the violent action of the human being on the lower level" and "justifies her savage revenge on the grounds that she has been treated with disrespect and mockery" so that she "takes measures and gives orders for the burial of the dead, prophesies the future," and "announces the foundation of a cult." This deliberate murder of her children by Medea appears to be Euripides's invention, although some scholars believe Neophron created this alternate tradition. Her filicide would go on to become the standard for later writers. Pausanias, writing in the late 2nd century AD, records five different versions of what happened to Medea's children after reporting that he has seen a monument for them while traveling in Corinth. Fleeing from Jason, Medea made her way to Thebes, where she healed Heracles (a former Argonaut) from the curse of Hera that led him to slay his sons.

After the murder of her children, Medea fled to Athens, where she met and married Aegeus. They had one son, Medus. Another version from Hesiod makes Medus the son of Jason. Her domestic bliss was once again shattered by the arrival of Aegeus's long-lost son, Theseus. Determined to preserve her own son's inheritance, Medea convinced her husband that Theseus was an imposter, making him a threat and that he needed to be disposed of. To do this, Medea was planning on poisoning him as she previously had other victims. As Medea handed Theseus a cup of poison, Aegeus recognized the young man's sword as his own, which he had left behind many years previously for his newborn son as soon as he came of age. Knocking the cup from Medea's hand, Aegeus embraced Theseus as his own.

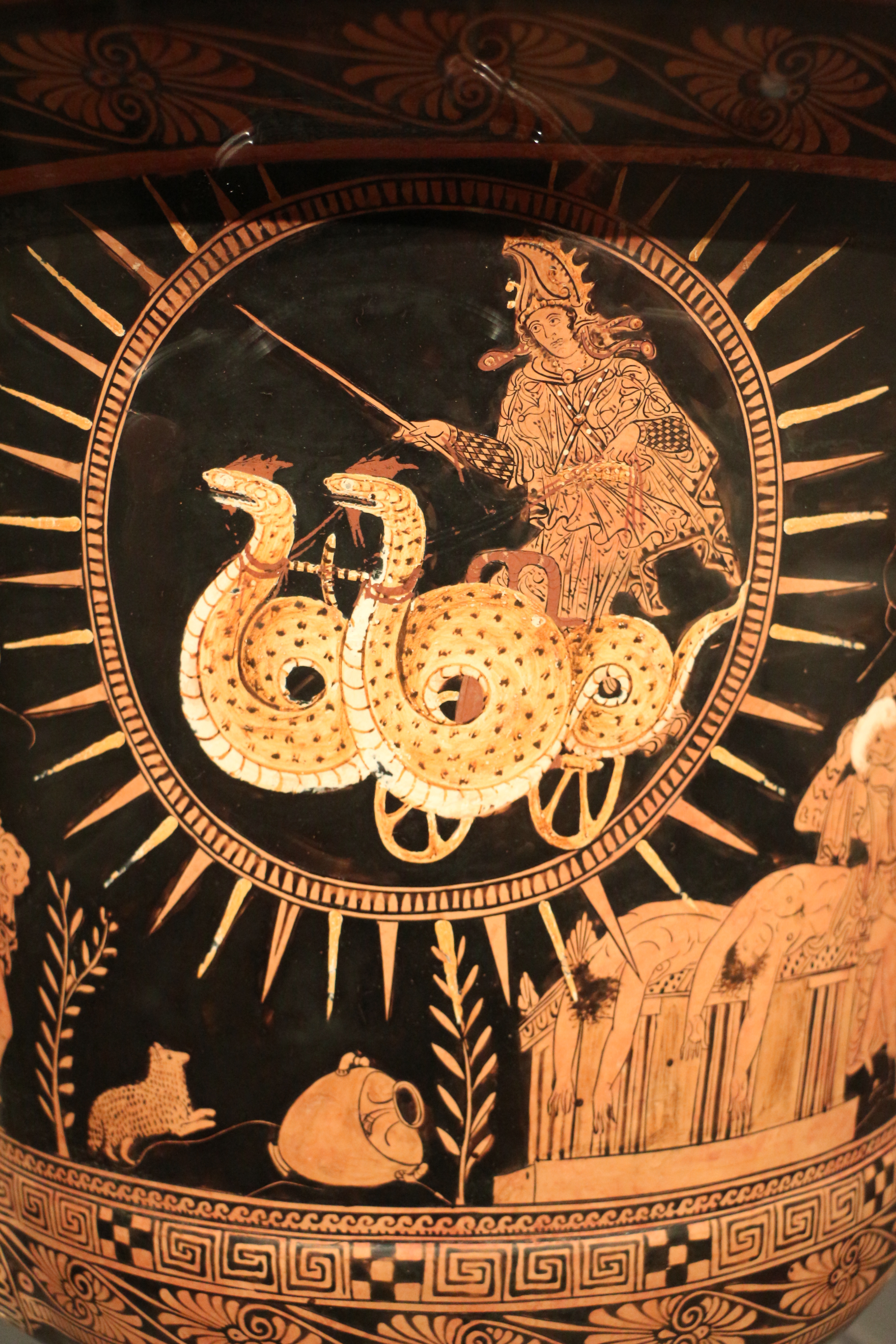
Medea flying on her chariot, (detail), krater, c. 480 BC Cleveland Museum

Medea returned to Colchis and found that Aeëtes had been deposed by his brother Perses, which prompted her to kill her uncle and restore the kingdom to her father. Herodotus reports another version, in which Medea and her son Medus fled from Athens, on her flying chariot. They landed in the Iranian plateau and lived among the Aryans, who then changed their name to the Medes.

Recounting the many variations of Medea's story, the 1st-century BC historian Diodorus Siculus wrote, "Speaking generally, it is because of the desire of the tragic poets for the marvelous that so varied and inconsistent an account of Medea has been given out."

== Personae of Medea ==
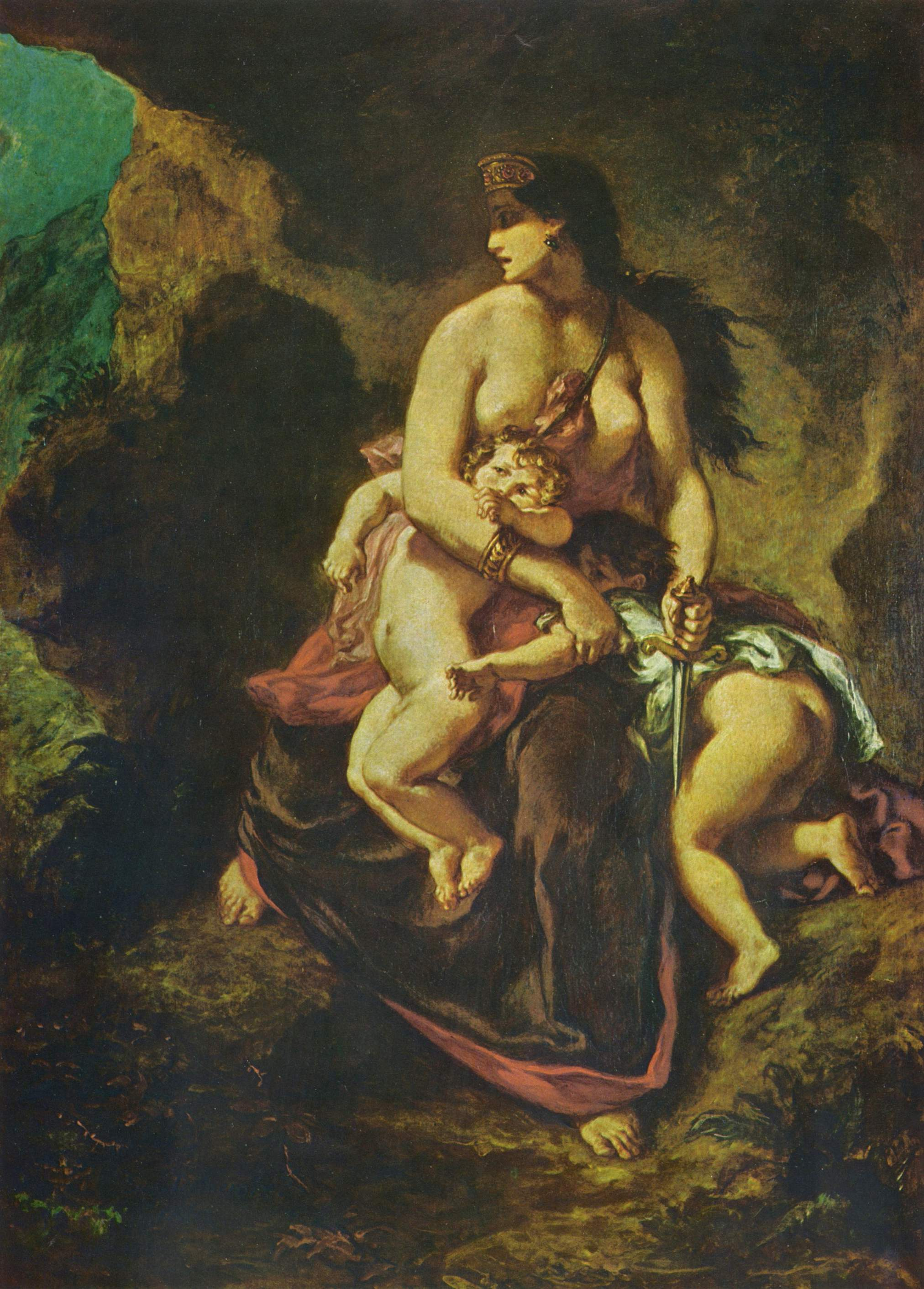
Medea About to Murder Her Children by Eugène Delacroix (1862)

In Euripides's play Medea, she is a woman scorned, rejected by her husband Jason and revenge seeking. Deborah Boedeker writes about different images and symbolism Euripides used in his play to evoke responses from his original Athenian audience. The Nurse, one of the characters, gives descriptions of Medea in the prologue, highlighting comparisons to great forces of nature and different animals. There are also many nautical references throughout the play either used by other characters when describing Medea or by Medea herself. By including these references, Boedeker argues that these comparisons were used to create connections to the type of woman Medea was. She holds great power (referred to by the comparisons to forces of nature), she relies on her basic animal-like instincts and emotions (connections to different animals like bulls and lions), and it draws the audience back to her original myth of Jason's quest for the Golden Fleece and the sea voyage taken by Jason, Medea, and the Argonauts.

Emma Griffiths adds to the analysis of Medea's character in Euripides's play by discussing the male/female dichotomy created by Euripides. Medea does not fit into the mold of a "normal woman" according to Athenian philosophy. She is depicted as having great intelligence and skill, traits typically viewed as masculine by Euripides's original audience. On the other hand, she uses her intelligence to manipulate the men around her. This manipulation would have been a negative female trait to the Athenian audience. Griffiths also acknowledges the paradox of the methods Medea uses to kill. She poisons the princess, which would have been seen as a feminine way of murder, yet kills her children in cold blood, which is seen as more masculine. Medea is also shown as a 'normal' Athenian mother by having a dialogue about her children and showing a strong maternal love and connection to them. Yet at the end of the play, she is able to kill her children as part of her revenge. It is through these opposites that Euripides creates a complicated character for his protagonist.

Marianne McDonald argues that "Medea's anger turns to violent action, which can make her into a symbol of freedom, and emblem for the colonized turning the tables on the colonizer. Euripides, more than all other tragedians, has predicted many of the horrors that occur in the modern world, showing both the glory and the monstrosity of the oppressed turned oppressor."

Although not the first depiction of Medea, the Argonautica by Apollonius of Rhodes gives a fuller description of events that lead up to Euripides's play, mainly surrounding Jason's quest for the Golden Fleece. In this literary work, Medea is presented not as a powerful woman seeking justice, but as a young woman who is desperately in love with Jason. So much in love that she decides to defy her father and kill her brother in order to help him. James J. Clauss writes about this Medea, attempting to unearth another version of this character for scholarship and discussion. He looks into different passages in the original text to define the meaning and draw connection to the different feelings Medea was experiencing. He argues the feelings of Medea's initial love for Jason, the shame she feels for loving him and for going against her family, and final agreement to help Jason in his quest.

Multiple scholars have discussed Medea's use as a "helper maiden" to Jason's quest. A helper maid is typically a young woman who helps on a hero's quest, usually out of love. Instead of being the center of the story, like she is in Euripides's Medea, this version of Medea is reduced to a supporting role. Her main purpose is to help the hero with his quest. Jason would never have been successful on his quest without Medea's help, something that is pointed out and referenced many times in ancient texts and contemporary scholarly work.

Other, non-literary traditions guided the vase-painters, and a localized, chthonic presence of Medea was propitiated with unrecorded emotional overtones at Corinth, at the sanctuary devoted to her slain children, or locally venerated elsewhere as a foundress of cities. Her capabilities of taking or restoring one's life can be related to her being a Sun-daughter and she repeatedly uses her skills—and cauldron—to rejuvenate.

=== Modern references ===
In his 2006 book The Happiness Hypothesis, social psychologist Jonathan Haidt quotes Medea talking about her struggle between her love to Jason and obligation to her father, as an example for the "divided Self" and the conflict between id and superego: "I am dragged along by a strange new force. Desire and reason are pulling in different directions. I see the right way and approve it, but follow the wrong."

== Written sources ==
In chronological order:

- Hesiod, Theogony 1000–1002
- Herodotus, Histories I.2 and VII.62i
- Pindar, Pythian Odes, IV
- Neophron, Medea (fragments from the play)
- Euripides, Medea
- Apollonius of Rhodes, Argonautica
- Plautus, Pseudolus 869–871
- Diodorus Siculus, Bibliotheca Historica
- Ovid

Heroides XII
Metamorphoses VII, 1–450
Tristia iii.9

- Seneca the Younger: Medea (tragedy)
- Hyginus, Fabulae 21–26
- Gaius Valerius Flaccus Argonautica (epic)
- Pseudo-Apollodorus Bibliotheca I, 23–28

== See also ==
- Medusa
- Medea gene
- Gudrun
- Morgan le Fay
- Peliades
- Pisidice of Methymna, who betrayed her father for the enemy

== Bibliography ==
- Clauss, James J.; Johnston, S. I., eds. (1997). Medea: Essays on Medea in Myth, Literature, Philosophy and Art. Princeton: Princeton University Press. ISBN 978-0691043760.
- McDermott, Emily (1985). Euripides' Medea: The Incarnation of Disorder. University Park, Pennsylvania: Penn State University Press. ISBN 9780271006475.
- Repath, Ian; Hermann, Fritz-Gregor (2019). Some Organic Readings in Narrative, Ancient and Modern: Gathered and Originally Presented as a Book for John. Groningen University Library. ISBN 978-9492444943.
- Smith, William (1873). ""Medeia or Medea"". Dictionary of Greek and Roman Biography and Mythology. London: John Murray.
