= The Death of Hercules =

1634 painting by Francisco de Zurbarán

- Hercules Seared by the Poisoned Robe, La muerte de Hércules (Spanish)
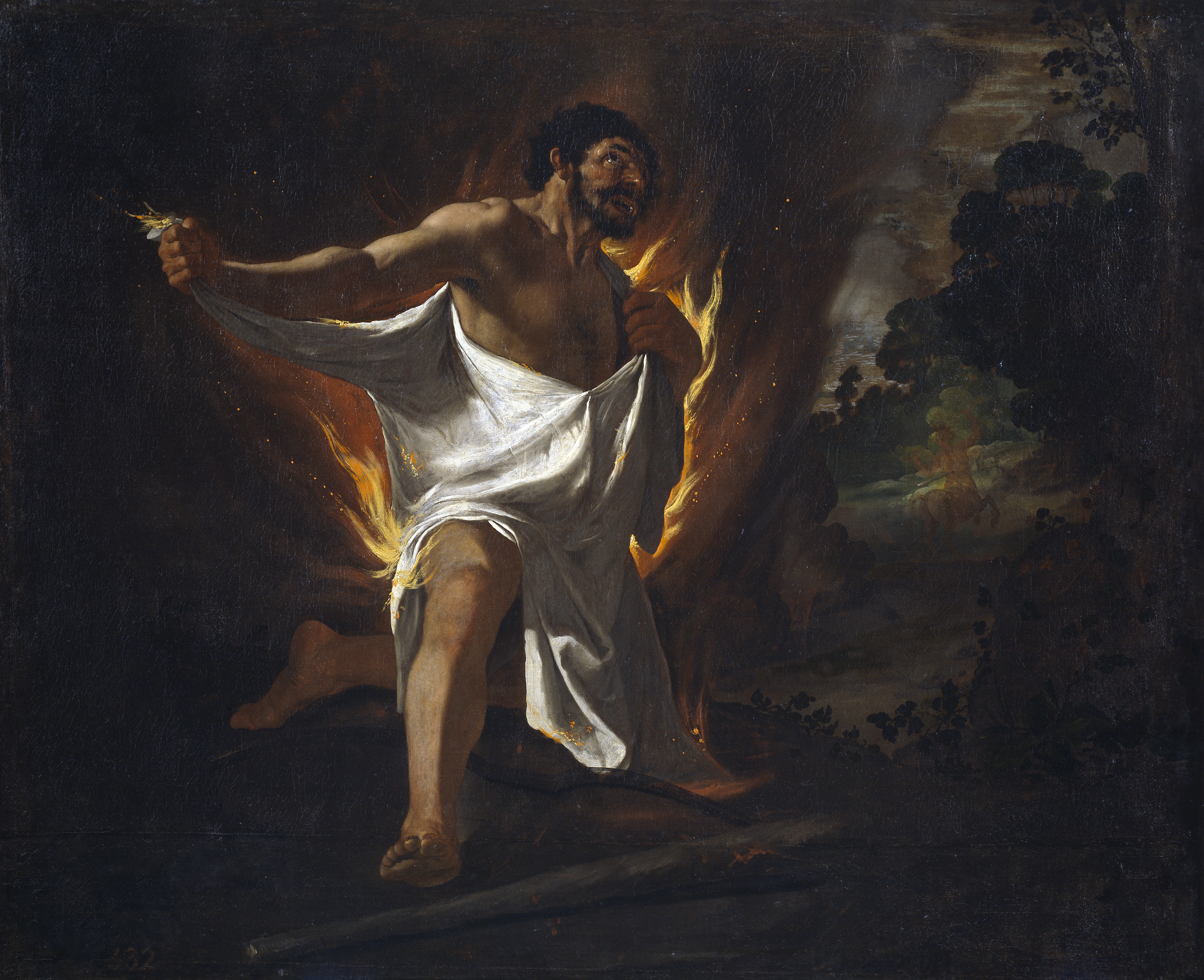
- The Death of Hercules (1634) by Francisco de Zurbarán
- Artist: Francisco de Zurbarán
- Completion date: 1634
- Medium: Oil on canvas
- Dimensions: 136 cm × 167.0 cm (53.5 in × 65.75 in)
- Location: Museo del Prado, Madrid
- Accession: P001250

The Death of Hercules (Spanish: La muerte de Hércules, alternatively known as Hercules Seared by the Poisoned Robe) (Note: Fox-Hindley 2019, p. 49 (for the Spanish title); Soria 1955, p. 156 (for the "Poisoned Robe" title).) is a 1634 painting by Francisco de Zurbarán, now in the Museo del Prado in Madrid. It belonged to a series of ten paintings on the life of Hercules for the Hall of Realms at the Palacio del Buen Retiro.

The painting is an oil on canvas and measures 53.5 by 65.75 inches (135.9 by 167.0 cm). It depicts Hercules burning as he tries to remove the poisoned Shirt of Nessus, while the centaur Nessus himself dies from Hercules's arrow in the background. The choice of the Herculean theme, as well as Zurbarán's decision to depict Hercules as burning without the funeral pyre normally present in the myth, fitted the royal ideology of Philip IV, who claimed to be a descendant of Hercules.

The painting's sources include a 1521 woodcut by the French artist Gabriel Salmon and a 1542 engraving of Nessus by Sebald Beham; they may also have included the paintings of Caravaggio and Jusepe de Ribera, a statue of Jerome by Pietro Torrigiano, and a work by Diego Velázquez, who supervised the decoration of the Retiro and communicated with Zurbarán throughout the painting of his Hercules series. Although the series has often been criticised by art critics, who note that Zurbarán's work normally handled more static figures and rarely involved painting nudes, The Death of Hercules is often cited as among the best pieces in it.

== Description ==
The Death of Hercules was one of a series of ten paintings, mostly depicting aspects of the stories of Hercules believed to have taken place in the Iberian Peninsula, commissioned from Francisco de Zurbarán for the Hall of Realms at the Palacio del Buen Retiro. The initial commission was for twelve paintings, corresponding to the canonical twelve Labours of Hercules: this was eventually reduced to ten, and the decision taken to place each picture over one of the hall's ten windows. Zurbarán, based in Seville, was the only painter from outside Madrid commissioned for the Retiro. The palace's decoration was supervised by the artist Diego Velázquez; The Death of Hercules was eventually placed on the south wall, about 10 feet (3.0 m) above the floor.

The painting is an oil on canvas and measures 53.5 by 65.75 inches (135.9 by 167.0 cm). It depicts Hercules trying to remove the poisoned Shirt of Nessus, as flames engulf his body. In the background can be seen the dying figure of the centaur Nessus, whom Hercules shot with an arrow poisoned with the blood of the Lernaean Hydra. The choice of stories from the life of Hercules reflected the ideological programme of the Spanish monarchy under Philip IV: Philip was believed to descend from Hercules via both the kings of Castille and the House of Burgundy. The imagery of Hercules's immolation recalled his apotheosis (ascension into godhood), and therefore implicitly invoked the immortality of the king and the legitimacy of his dynasty. In contrast to the traditional myth, Hercules is not depicted as burning on the funeral pyre he constructed for himself, though Zurbarán follows tradition by placing Hercules's distinctive club at his feet, and by depicting him as a gigantic figure with curled hair.

Zurbarán was initially commissioned to make the painting, as part of a series of twelve, on 12 June 1634; he received a total of 1100 ducats for the eventual ten paintings, which included payment for two works depicting the defence of Cádiz in 1625. The Death of Hercules is currently held in the Museo del Prado, Spain's national art museum, in Madrid.

== Sources ==
The painting was modelled on a 1521 woodcut by the French artist Gabriel Salmon. The figure of Nessus was taken from a 1542 engraving by Sebald Beham. Zurbarán modified the composition of Salmon's picture by adding colour, and by turning Hercules's body to emphasise his dying gesture and to create greater contrast between the painting's light and dark areas. Martin S. Soria has written that the "bold three-dimensional thrust of the dying Hercules's right foot" shows inspiration from the work of Caravaggio and his followers, including Jusepe de Ribera. Soria further suggests that the figure was inspired by a 1525 statue of Jerome by Pietro Torrigiano, in Zurbarán's home city of Seville, and by a 1634 painting of the jester Juan de Calabazas by Velázquez: Velázquez was painting the latter work while Zurbarán was working on the Hercules series, and communicated with him daily. (Note: Soria 1955, p. 156. For the date of Torrigiano's statue, see Pereda 2024, p. 191.)

Possible sources for The Death of Hercules
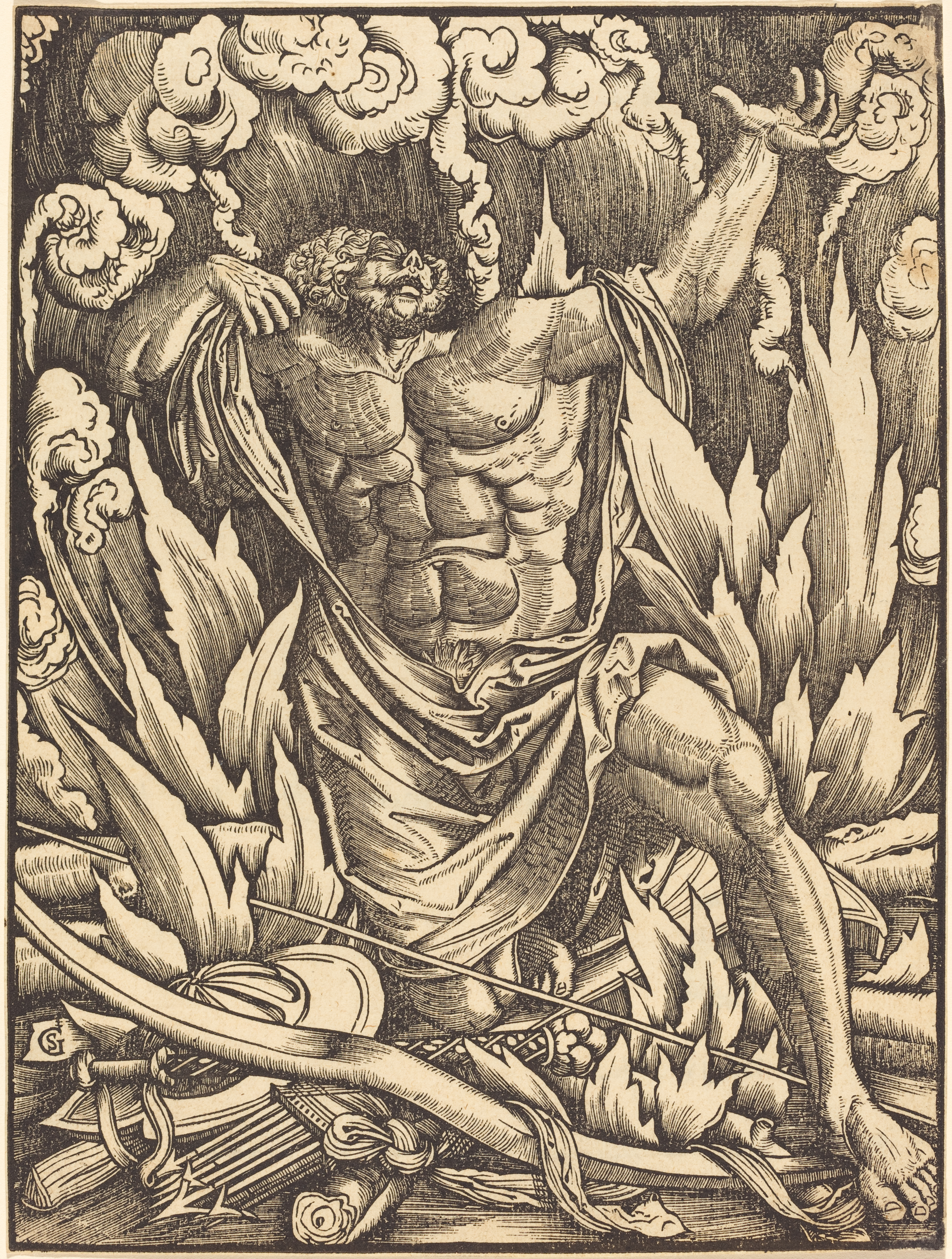
Salmon's woodcut of the death of Hercules, 1521

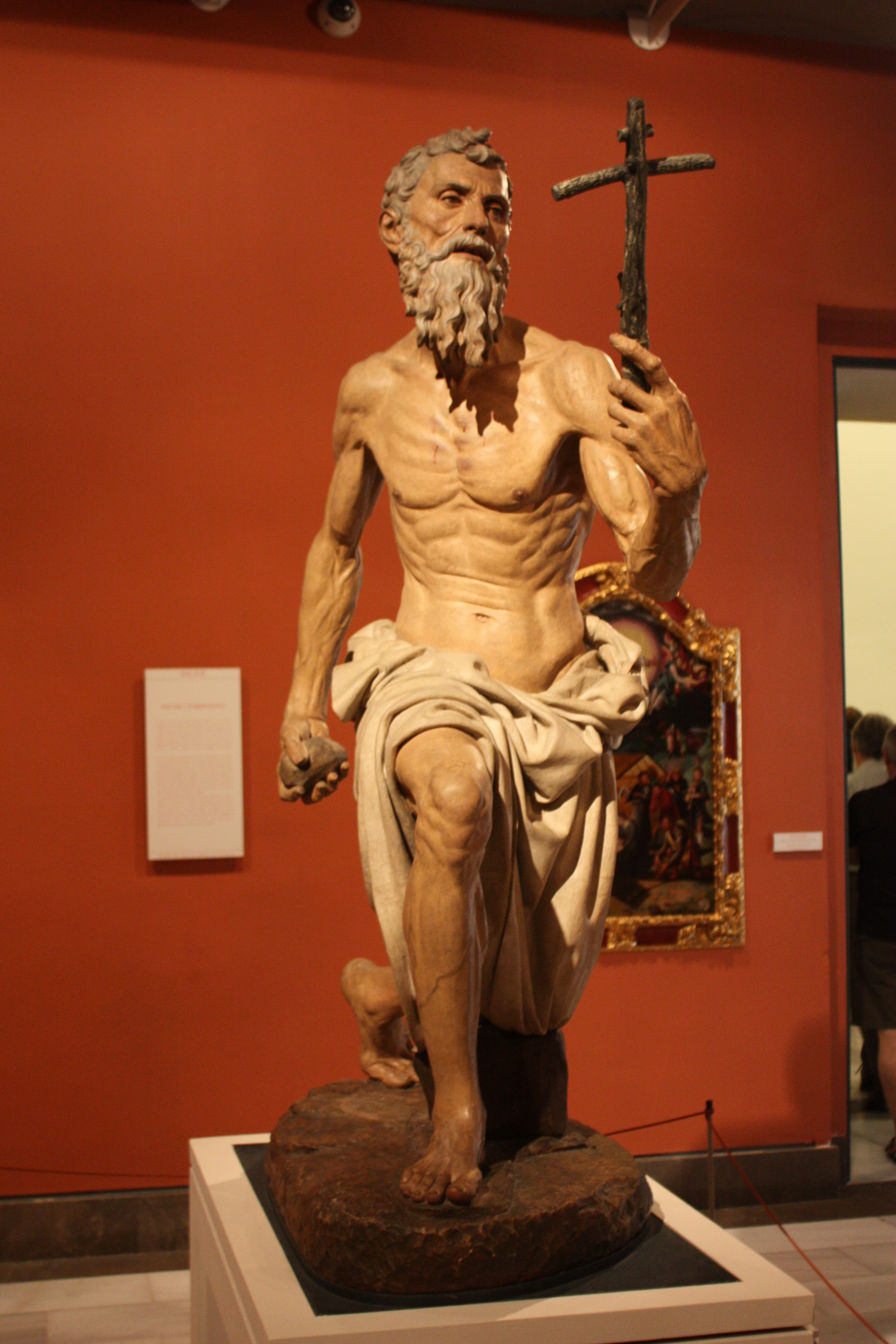
Torrigiano's 1525 statue of Jerome

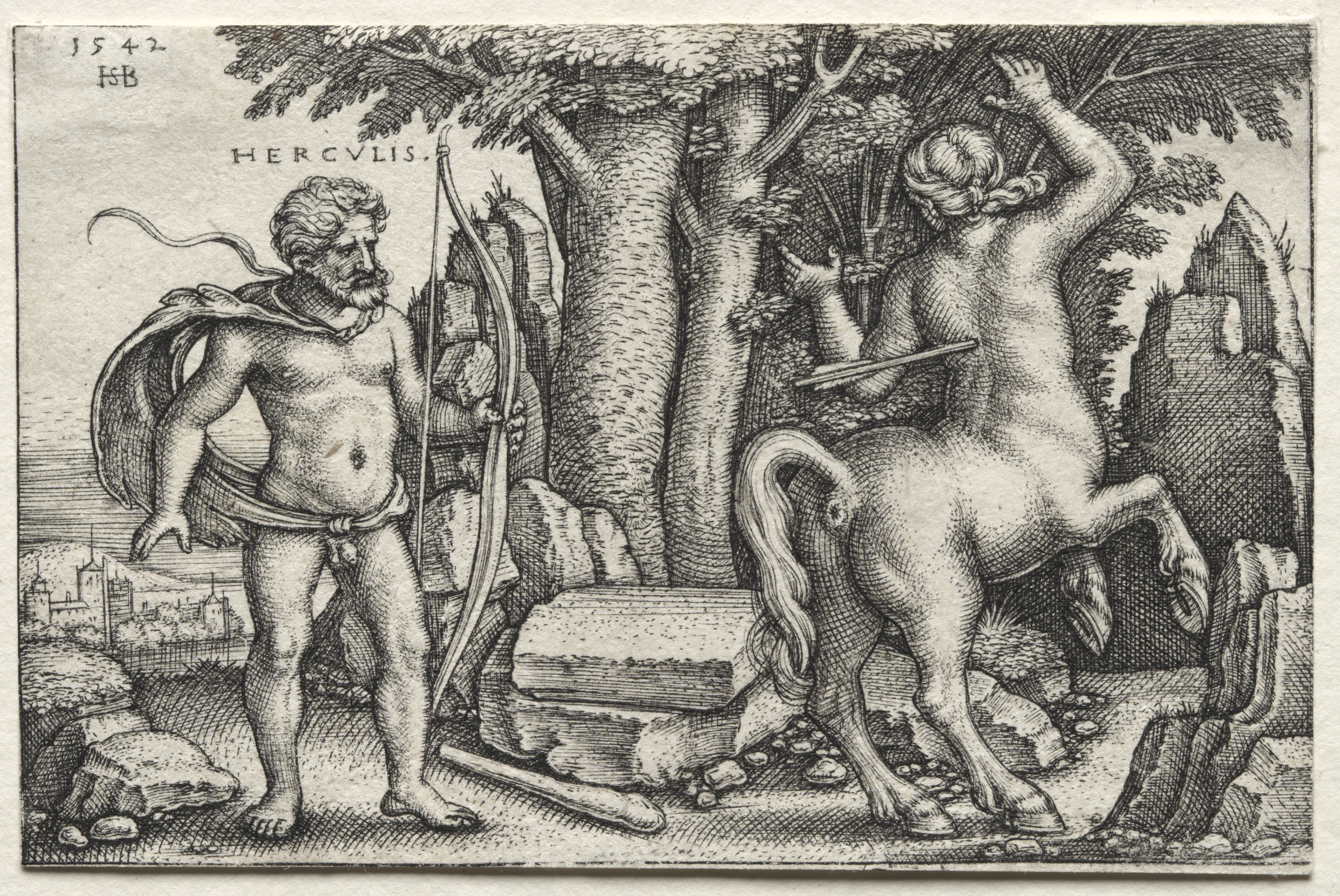
Beham's 1542 engraving of the death of Nessus

== Reception ==
The subject-matter of the Hercules series was outside Zurbarán's normal expertise: he was more used to religious imagery with static, clothed figures, rather than the dynamic nude characters called for by the classical theme. Indeed, the Hercules series are his only surviving mythological paintings. The quality of the paintings has often been criticised: Paul Guinard wrote that Zurbarán was "not very well suited" for the theme. Jonathan Brown described The Death of Hercules as "one of the outstanding episodes" in the Hercules series. Jeannine Baticle similarly calls it the best of the series, though writes that its "dramatic composition ... to some extent obscures the fact ... that the nude figure ... was not Zurbarán's forte". Brown and John Huxtable Elliott suggest that the primary appeal of Zurbarán as an artist was his ability to make his works highly legible, and that "the rough-hewn, unidealised Hercules type invented by Zurbaran captures in an original way the brute force and inexhaustible power of the ancient hero".

== Bibliography ==
- Baticle, Jeannine (1988). Zurbarán. New York: Metropolitan Museum of Art. ISBN 0-87099-502-2.
- Brown, Jonathan; Elliott, John Huxtable (2003) [1980]. A Palace for a King: The Buen Retiro and the Court of Philip IV. New Haven: Yale University Press. ISBN 0-300-10185-6.
- Brown, Jonathan (1991) [1974]. Zurbarán. Masters of Art. New York: Harry N. Adams. ISBN 0-8109-3962-2.
- Fox-Hindley, Dian (2019). Hercules and the King of Portugal: Icons of Masculinity and Nation in Caldéron's Spain. Lincoln: University of Nebraska Press. ISBN 978-1-4962-0773-9.
- Pereda, Felipe (2024). The Man Who Broke Michelangelo's Nose. University Park: Pennsylvania State University Press. ISBN 978-0-271-09694-0.
- Soria, Martin S. (1955) [1953]. The Paintings of Zurbarán (2nd ed.). London: Phaidon. OCLC 1427972276.
