= Medea (1969 film) =

- Directed by: Pier Paolo Pasolini
- Written by: Pier Paolo Pasolini
- Based on: Medea play by Euripides
- Produced by: Franco Rossellini
- Starring: Maria Callas; Massimo Girotti; Giuseppe Gentile; Laurent Terzieff
- Cinematography: Ennio Guarnieri
- Edited by: Nino Baragli
- Music by: Pier Paolo Pasolini; Elsa Morante
- Release date: 1969
- Running time: 106 minutes
- Countries: Italy; France; West Germany
- Language: Italian

Medea is a 1969 Italian film written and directed by Pier Paolo Pasolini, based on the ancient myth of Medea. The film stars opera singer Maria Callas in her only film role and is largely a faithful portrayal of the myth of Jason and the Argonauts and the events of Euripides' play Medea.

The film was received positively by critics but did not receive commercial success. According to film commentator Tony Rayns the film represents a committedly adversarial piece of art from the director who loved to challenge society. Rayns calls the film "a love song to Maria Callas" and describes the ending as "backing him (Pasolini) into a cul-de-sac" for the dark ending of the film which almost seems like a resignation from cultural production. Indeed, Pasolini's dramatic and adverse personality is very much alive in this film which depicts Medea's murder of her children born of Jason and his betrothed.

== Plot ==
In the city of Iolcus in Greece, King Aeson is removed from power by his half-brother Pelias who becomes a cruel tyrant mad with power. Giasone, Aeson's son, is sent to the centaur Chirone to be hidden away where Pelias cannot get him. Chirone teaches Giasone about the world and tells him about the voyage he will one day take to Colchis, where the Golden Fleece of Ares is kept. Colchis is home to many bizarre rituals, like human sacrifice, which are presided over by the priestess Medea. Giasone grows up, travels to Iolcus, and challenges Pelias to the throne. Pelias says he can have the kingdom if he retrieves the Golden Fleece from Colchis on the other side of the world. Giasone agrees. Meanwhile, Medea has a vision of Giasone and is so enraptured with him that she asks her brother, Apsirto, to help her steal the fleece in preparation for his arrival.

They travel far into the wilderness, where they eventually join the Argonauts who have been marching to Colchis. The King and the Colchians realize that the fleece has been stolen from under them. They pursue Medea and intend to retrieve the fleece. Medea realizes the Colchians are chasing them, so she kills her brother and dismembers his body so that they are forced to stop and collect his remains. This delay allows Giasone and Medea to escape. Once she arrives in Greece, Medea has a spiritual crisis after realizing how alien Greek practices are to her. In this new place, she cannot connect with the earth and its magic.

When they return to Iolcus, they deliver the fleece to Pelias, who reneges on his promise. Deciding the fleece has little power, Giasone accepts this decision. Medea assumes the clothing and duties of a traditional Greek wife, but Giasone soon tires of her. He travels to Corinth, where he sees a vision of two Chirones; one is in the form of a centaur, while the other is completely human. The centaur remains silent while the human Chirone tells Giasone that Medea is torn between her past ritualistic self, the self that performed the human rituals in Colchis, and the new less spiritual Greek self. Though Medea bears him two sons, Giasone grows more and more distant from her. He decides to pursue a political marriage to a Corinthian princess, Glauce. Glauce's father, Creonte, is afraid of Medea's wrath and magic and banishes her. Upon her request, and against his better judgment, he gives her a day to prepare for her journey.

The enraged Medea uses this delay to plot revenge against Giasone and his new bride. She pretends to be happy and accepting of their marriage, claiming that her only wish is that the King not banish the children she shares with Giasone. Giasone goes to Creonte with Medea's request. Medea then sends Glauce a poisoned robe and crown with a message of peace, and has a vision in which Glauce tries them on and bursts into flames. Later Glauce puts on Medea's dress and, burning with poison, runs along the ramparts and throws herself from the city walls. Poisoned from her embrace, Creonte jumps after her to his death. That night, Medea bathes each of her sons in turn, rocks them lovingly to sleep, and stabs them to death. The deaths occur offscreen; we only see the bloody knife. She lays them out on separate beds.

Completing her revenge, Medea sets fire to the house with the corpses of her sons inside. Held back by the fire, Giasone pleads with Medea to let him bury their children. She refuses from the flames, shouting, "It is useless! Nothing is possible anymore!"

== Cast ==
- Maria Callas as Medea, the main protagonist of the film and Jason's wife
- Giuseppe Gentile as Giasone, Medea's husband
  - Luigi Masironi as Giasone at age 5
  - Michelangelo Masironi as Giasone at age 13
- Laurent Terzieff as Chirone, a centaur and Giasone's mentor
- Paul Jabara as Pelias, Giasone's uncle and King of Iolcus
- Sergio Tramonti as Apsirto, Medea's brother
- Luigi Barbini as an Argonaut
- Gianni Brandizi as an Argonaut
- Franco Jacobbi as an Argonaut
- Massimo Girotti as Creonte, King of Corinth
- Margareth Clémenti as Glauce, Creon's daughter, Princess of Corinth, and Giasone's mistress
- Annamaria Chio as Wet nurse
- Graziella Chiarcossi as Glauce's maid
- Gerard Weiss as Second centaur
- Piera Degli Esposti
- Mirella Pamphili
- Gian Paolo Durgar

== Credits ==
- Director: Pier Paolo Pasolini
- Written by: Pier Paolo Pasolini
- Based on: Medea, the play by Euripides
- Produced by: Franco Rossellini, Marina Cicogna
- Cinematography: Ennio Guarnieri
- Sound: Carlo Tarchi
- Edited by: Nino Baragli
- Production design and set decoration: Dante Ferretti
- Costume design: Piero Tosi

== Relation to Euripides' play ==
The film does not use the dialogue written by Euripides but the plot does closely follow the structure of his play. The beginning portions of the film also follow the early life of Jason and his voyage to Colchis where he meets Medea.

== Color scheme for costume design ==
Piero Tosi explains in the supplements to the Criterion Collection's release of the film that there are three basic color schemes for the costumes

- Colchis: earth tones, shades of brown with blues in the mix.
- Iolcus: white and yellow hues, mainly bright colors, such as chalk white
- Corinth: red, inspired by Pontormo's painting.

== Score ==
For the score, Pasolini chose music from various Eastern cultures because prehistoric music was not re-creatable. According to musicologist Jon Solomon from The Sound of Cinematic Antiquity: "For the rituals in Colchis he (Pasolini) selected Tibetan chant for the elders, Persian santur music for general Colchian atmosphere, and Balkan choral music, characterized by a female chorus doubling in two parts a second apart, for the women promoting the growth of new crops with the blood of the young victim of sparagmos, the Greek Dionysiac ritual of dismemberment."

The Medea soundtrack includes:

- Musiche sacre giapponesi, edizioni Bixio Sam, Milano.
- Canti d'amore iraniani, edizioni Bixio Sam, Milano.
- Musiche tibetane: campanelli buddisti, Khyabjug Chenden, Musica del Ricevimento (tratta dall'LP Tibet III, A Musical Anthology of the Orient, U.N.E.S.C.O.)

Musical coordination by Pier Paolo Pasolini and EIsa Morante.

== Filming locations ==
The film was shot between May 1969 - August 1969, filmed in Göreme Open Air Museum's early Christian churches, Pisa, and the Citadel of Aleppo.

- Citadel of Aleppo, Aleppo, Syria as Corinth, Greece
- Grado, Gorizia, Friuli-Venezia Giulia, Italy as the King of Corinth's residence
- Göreme Open Air Museum, Göreme, Nevsehir Province, Turkey as Temple of the Golden fleece in Colchis
- Cappadocia, Turkey as Colchis
- Lido Marechiaro, Anzio, Rome, Lazio, Italy as Corinth, Greece
- Viterbo, Lazio, Italy
- Piazza dei Miracoli, Pisa, Tuscany, Italy
- Cinecittà Studios, Rome, Lazio, Italy as miscellaneous interiors

== Reception ==
Critical response to Medea has been described as divided, with early reactions focusing on its unconventional narrative structure, visual style, and Maria Callas’s performance in her only feature film role as an actress.

A contemporary review in ‘‘The New York Times’’ by Vincent Canby noted Callas’s “fascinating” presence in the title role and highlighted the film’s stylised approach to the Euripidean myth, while acknowledging its highly symbolic and unconventional treatment of narrative.Canby, Vincent (29 October 1971). "Callas Stars in Pasolini's Medea". The New York Times.

Italian press reception at the time was reportedly divided. Morando Morandini (’‘Il Giorno’’) criticised the film’s narrative pacing while praising its visual reconstruction of archaic landscapes. Callisto Cosulich (’‘L’Unità’’) interpreted the film positively as a critique of modern rationality through its depiction of cultural conflict between archaic and classical civilisations. Leo Pestelli (’‘La Stampa’’) offered a mixed response, praising the visual composition and Callas’s presence while noting a loss of dramatic momentum. Giovanni Grazzini (’‘Corriere della Sera’’) described the film as ambitious but highly esoteric and distant in tone, and Mino Argentieri (’‘Avanti!’’) praised its ideological framing and Callas’s embodiment of Medea’s “barbaric dignity”.These assessments are drawn from compiled contemporary Italian press commentary; individual archival citations should be added where available.

Retrospective criticism has generally been more favourable. Philip French, writing in ‘‘The Guardian’’, described the film as a “Freudian-Marxist-Christian take on the myth”, praising its visual ambition as “visually astonishing” and calling Callas a “commanding presence”.French, Philip (1 January 2012). "Medea". The Guardian.

Writing for the British Film Institute, Alexandra Heller-Nicholas praised Callas’s “diva-esque regality” and described the film as a blend of classical myth and Italian social realism. She argued that Pasolini’s use of non-professional actors and location shooting creates a “primitive naturalism” and emphasises the tension between archaic sacred culture and modern rationality.Heller-Nicholas, Alexandra (7 September 2022). "10 great films about queens and empresses". British Film Institute.

Similarly, Katie Magdalene writing for Film Obsessive interprets the film as a mythic and philosophical work combining anthropology, ritual imagery, and cultural critique, emphasising its presentation of sacred reality in tension with modernity.Magdalene, Katie (2023). "Myth and Meaning in Pasolini's Medea". Film Obsessive.

Overall, modern criticism has tended to emphasise the film’s visual and symbolic ambition, as well as Callas’s performance, which remains her only feature film role.

== Home video release ==
The film was released on blu-ray in Region 2 by the British Film Institute and was also made available on the BFI Player streaming service. In Region 1/A, the Criterion Collection released the film in 2023 on blu-ray in a 9-BD box set Pasolini 101.

== See also ==
- List of historical drama films
- Greek mythology in popular culture
