= Poison dress =

Mythical dress

A poison dress is a dress or robe that has in some way been poisoned, and is a common motif in legends and folktales of various cultures, including ancient Greece, Mughal India, and the United States.

== Greek mythology ==
The poison dress motif is similar to the Shirt of Flame. In Greek mythology, when Jason left the sorceress Medea to marry Glauce, King Creon's daughter, Medea took her revenge by sending Glauce a poison dress and a golden coronet, also dipped in poison. This resulted in the death of the princess and, subsequently, the king, when he tried to save her.

The Shirt of Nessus is smeared with the poisoned blood of the centaur Nessus, which was given to Hercules by Hercules' wife, Deianira. Deianira had been tricked by Nessus and made to believe that the blood would ensure Hercules's faithfulness. According to Sophocles' tragedy The Women of Trachis, Hercules began to perspire when he put on the shirt, which soon clung to his flesh, corroding it. He eventually threw himself onto a pyre on Mount Oeta in extreme agony and burned to death.

== Indian folklore ==
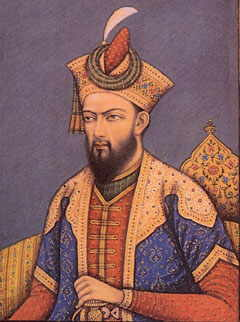
Aurangzeb (r. 1658–1707), considered by his subjects a fakir or wizard, was credited with using poison khalats to eliminate some of his perceived enemies.

Numerous tales of poison khalats (robes of honour) have been recorded in historical, folkloric, and medical texts of British Indianists. Gifts of clothing were common in major life-cycle rituals in pre-industrial India and these stories revolve around fears of betrayal, inspired by ancient custom of giving khalats to friends and enemies as demonstrations of a social relationship or a political alliance.

In 1870, Norman Chevers, M.D., a Surgeon-Major to the Bengal Medical Service, authored Manual of Medical Jurisprudence for India, describing unusual crimes involving poisons native to India. The book included three cases of poison khalat death, attributing the cause of one of the deaths to lethal vesicants impregnating the fabric of the robe and entering the victim's sweat pores.

== American urban legends ==
The theme of the poison dress appears in several American urban legends, which were recorded in folklore collections and journal articles in the 1940s and 1950s.

Stith Thompson, an American folklorist, noted the classical prototype in these stories, "Shirt of Nessus", and assigned Motif D1402.5, "Magic shirt burns wearer up". Jan Harold Brunvand provides the summary of one of the stories:

Girl wears new formal gown to dance. Several times during the evening she feels faint, has escort take her outside for fresh air. Finally she becomes really ill, dies in the restroom. Investigation reveals that the dress has been the cause of her death. It had been used as the funeral dress for a young girl; it had been removed from the corpse before burial and returned to the store. The formaldehyde which the dress has absorbed from the corpse enters the pores of the dancing girl.

Folklorist Ernest Baughman speculated that the story might have been used as adverse publicity to discredit a well-known store, since several variants of the story specifically mention the name of the store at which the dress was supposedly purchased. The legend continued to be told long after its initial popularity, with "embalming fluid" sometimes replacing the formaldehyde mentioned in the earlier version. This urban legend was dramatized in the episode "'Til Death Do We Part" from the crime-scene drama CSI: NY and in the second story ("Two Sisters") of the sixth episode of the third season of the television anthology series Beyond Belief: Fact or Fiction.

Also contributing to the poison-dress theme is the prevalence of smallpox-contaminated blankets, which were given to Native Americans. Well-documented examples include the tainted blankets gifted to Indians at Fort Pitt in 1763.

== Arabia ==
The poet Imru' al-Qais is said to have died after being gifted a poisoned robe.
