= Mušmaḫḫū =

Ancient Mesopotamian mythical creature

Mušmaḫḫū, inscribed in Sumerian as 𒈲𒈤 MUŠ.MAḪ, Akkadian as muš-ma-ḫu, meaning "Exalted/distinguished Serpent", was an ancient Mesopotamian mythological hybrid of serpent, lion and bird, sometimes identified with the seven-headed serpent slain by Ninurta in the mythology of the Sumerian period. He is one of the three horned snakes, with his companions, Bašmu and Ušumgallu, with whom he may have shared a common mythological origin.

== Mythology ==
In Angim or "Ninurta's return to Nippur", the storm god describes one of his weapons as "the seven-mouthed muš-mah serpent" (line 138), reminiscent of the Greek myth of Heracles and the seven headed Lernaean Hydra he slew in the second of his Twelve labours. An engraved shell of the Early Dynastic period shows Ninğirsu slaying the seven-headed mušmaḫḫū.

In the Epic of Creation, Enûma Eliš, Tiāmat gives birth (alādu) to mythical serpents, described as mušmaḫḫū, "with sharp teeth, merciless fangs, instead of blood she filled their bodies with venom".

== See also ==
- Anzû, a massive bird whose death was sometimes credited to Ninurta
- Ninurta's Dragon
