= Ušumgallu =

One of three horned snakes in Akkadian mythology

Ušumgallu or Ushumgallu (Note: Syllablized as Ú-šum-gal-lu.) (Sumerian: 𒁔 𒃲ušum.gal, "Great Dragon") (Note: Wiggermann instead proposes "prime venomous snake”. Winter translated it as "predator".) was one of the three horned snakes in Akkadian mythology, along with the Bašmu and Mušmaḫḫū. Usually described as a lion-dragon demon, it has been somewhat speculatively identified with the four-legged, winged dragon of the late 3rd millennium BCE.

== Mythology ==
Tiamat is said to have "clothed the raging lion-dragon with fearsomeness" in the Epic of Creation, Enuma Elish. The god Nabû was described as "he who tramples the lion-dragon" in the hymn to Nabû. The late neo-Assyrian text "Myth of the Seven Sages" recalls: "The fourth (of the seven apkallu's, "sages", is) Lu-Nanna, (only) two-thirds Apkallu, who drove the ušumgallu-dragon from É-ninkarnunna, the temple of Ištar of Šulgi."

Aššur-nāṣir-apli II placed golden icons of ušumgallu at the pedestal of Ninurta. Its name became a royal and divine epithet, for example: ušumgal kališ parakkī, "unrivaled ruler of all the sanctuaries". Marduk is called "the ušumgallu-dragon of the great heavens".

In the god list An = Anum Ušumgal is listed as the sukkal (vizier) of Ninkilim.

== See also ==
- Anzû, a massive bird whose death was sometimes credited to Ninurta
- Dragon, killed by Ninurta
- Seven-headed serpent, killed by Ninurta
- Yaldabaoth
