= Seven-headed serpent =

Ancient Sumerian monster

The Seven-headed Serpent (from Sumerian muš-saĝ-imin: snake with seven heads, or muš-maḫ-saĝ-imin: great snake with seven heads) in Sumerian religion was one of the Heroes slain by Ninurta, patron god of Lagash, in ancient Iraq. Its body was hung on the "shining cross-beam" of Ninurta's chariot (lines 55–63). It is also a synonym for Satan in the Book of Revelation, with John Day writing that the myth of this multiple headed dragon was still known to the authors of later Jewish and Christian literature.

In 2022, a seal was excavated in Tel Hazor dated to the 8th century BCE. It was a depiction of a hero or god slaying a seven-headed serpent, possibly Litanu from the Ugarit texts or Leviathan and Tannin in the Bible. The figure was ambiguous by gender, and could be Baal, the warrior goddess Anat, or Yahweh. The other imagery on the seal included a flying Uraeus and a Griffin.

== References in literature ==
=== Mesopotamian texts ===
Sumerian poem of Angim (Return of Ninurta to Nippur) lines 33–42, "He hung the Seven-headed Serpent from the dust guard...he hung the Muš-mah from the yoke."

The tale of Ninurta's Exploits (Lugal-e) line 55, "The hero [Ninurta] smote the Seven-headed serpent, he eradicated the Muš-maḫ."

Enūma Eliš (Babylonian Epic of Creation) tablet I lines 135–140, "She stationed the Mušmaḫḫu [seven-headed serpent], the Ušumgallu [lion-dragon], and the Bašmu [venomous snake]..."

=== Ugaritic texts ===
In the Baal Cycle KTU 1.2.IV and KTU 1.3.III, "Because you smote Lotan, the twisting serpent, (and) made an end of the crooked serpent, the tyrant with seven heads..." [...] "I did crush the crooked serpent! The tyrant with seven heads".

=== Greco-Roman texts ===
Hesiod's Theogony lines 313–315, "And third she [Echidna] bare the Lernaean Hydra, full of destructive thoughts, whom the goddess white-armed Hera nurtured...but the son of Zeus, called Heracles, slew it."

Euripides, Herakles (The Madness of Hercules) lines 419–422, "And he cleared the marsh of Lerna, destroying the multi-headed, venomous hydra...the hound of many heads."

Virgil's Aeneid Book VI lines 576–577, "More fierce than they, a Hydra takes her place, And fifty gaping mouths her dreadful body grace."

=== Jewish and Christian texts ===
Psalm 74:14 "You crushed the heads of Leviathan; you gave him as food for the creatures of the wilderness."

Revelation 12:3 "Then another portent appeared in heaven: a great red dragon with seven heads and ten horns, and seven diadems on his heads."

Revelation 13:1 "And I saw a beast rising out of the sea, with ten horns and seven heads; and on its horns were ten diadems, and on its heads were blasphemous names."

Odes of Solomon 22 "He who overthrew by my hands the dragon with seven heads, And placed me at his roots that I might destroy his seed."

Pistis Sophia 66 "One of them changed itself into the form of a great serpent; another again changed itself also into the form of a seven-headed basilisk; again another changed to the form of a dragon;"

=== Hindu and Buddhist texts ===
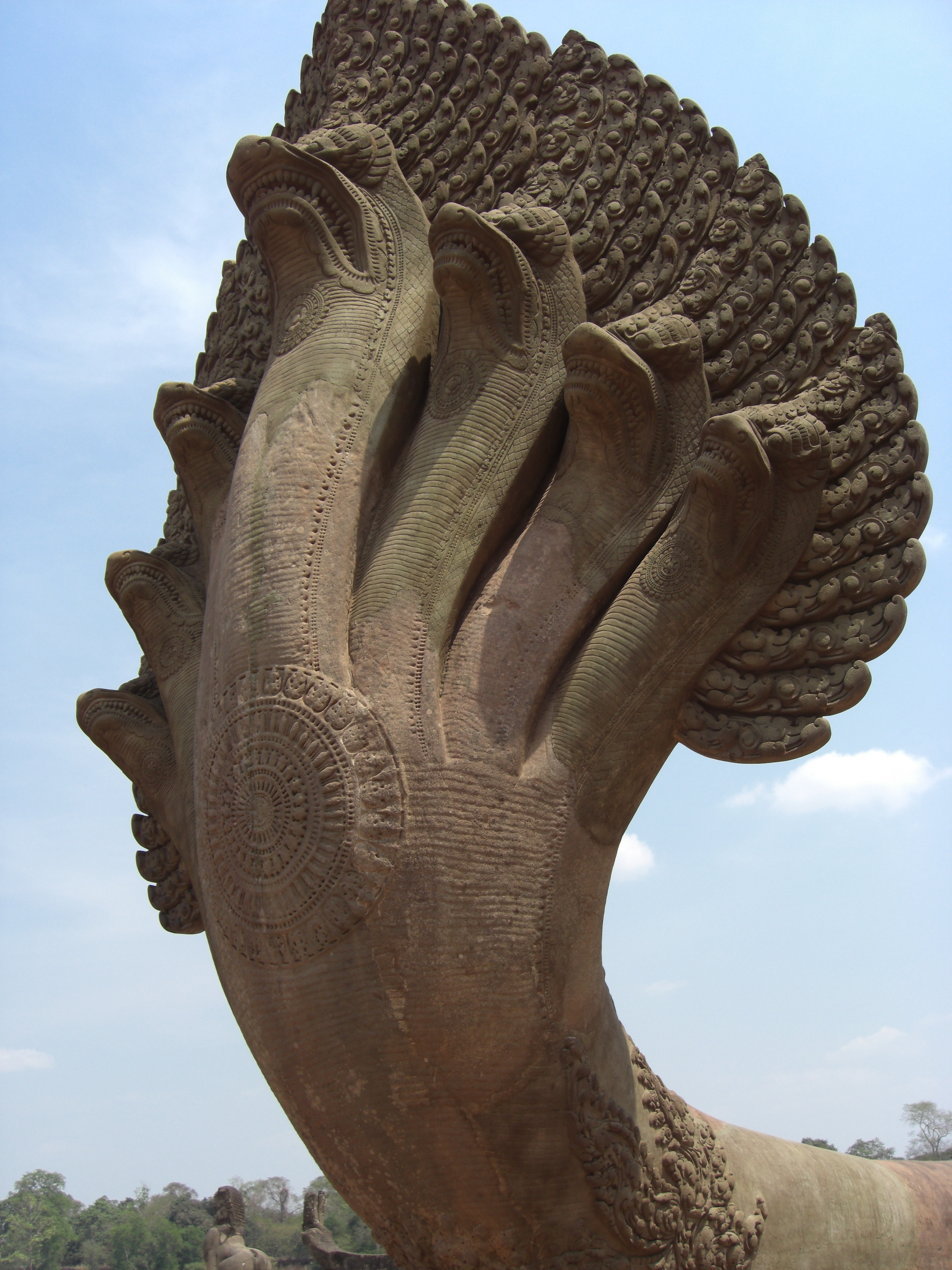
Angkor Seven-Headed Naga at Phimeanakas, Cambodia.

The Mahabharata Adi Parva Chapter 25, "And the multi-headed snakes, spitting fire and venom, filled the sky...the great serpent Shesha, with his many blazing heads, came to support the earth."

Mucalinda Sutta (Udana 2.1) of the Khuddaka Nikaya, "Then Mucalinda, the king of the serpents, came out from his abode and having encircled the body of the Blessed One seven times with his coils, he stood holding his large hood over his head..."

Chronicles of Kojiki (Records of Ancient Matters) Chapter 19, "It has one body with eight heads and eight tails; its eyes are red like the winter-cherry...and its length extends over eight valleys and eight hills."

=== Modern era ===
The Seven-headed Serpent, was a Greek fairy tale of the same name which was adapted by Andrew Lang in his the Yellow Fairy Book.

In Xhosa traditional folktales, South African storyteller Gcina Mhlophe adapts the narrative with a man cursed to transform into a frightening seven headed snake.

Joseph A. McCullough records that in Slavic mythology, Zmey is a dragon that in various folklore ranges from having three to twelve heads. Damian L. Eguenio documents the Legend of Mount Kanlaon, which is a tale from Negros Island that involves a hero named Khan Laon who goes to save a princess from sacrificing herself to the seven-headed dragon.

In Venezuelan oral tradition, there is a folklore that predates the arrival of the Spanish along the Orinoco River. The legend revolved around a giant seven-headed serpent that lives at the foot of a stone, and whirlpools are caused by the creature swallowing everything around it.

Trench Crusade a table top game, features a major faction called the Court of the Seven Headed Serpent, where each head represents one of the seven deadly sins. In Dungeons and Dragons, the deity Tiamat is a dragon with many heads inspired by the Babylonian chaos serpent of the same name.

== See also ==
- Anzû, a great bird whose death was sometimes credited to Ninurta
- Bašmu ("venomous serpent"), a possibly identical serpent slain by Ninurta
- Beast of Revelation
- Chaoskampf
- Comparative mythology
- Dragon, a beast slain by Ninurta
- Illuyanka
- Ladon
- Lernaean Hydra
- Mušmaḫḫū ("distinguished serpent")
- Nāga
- Nehushtan
- Serpents in mythology
- Serpent symbolism
- Shesha
- Ušumgallu ("the great dragon")
- Yamata no Orochi
