= Shirt of Flame =

The phrase Shirt of Flame may refer to:

- a tunica molesta, a shirt or tunic impregnated with flammable material used for torture or execution in Ancient Rome.
- Ateşten Gömlek, known in English as The Shirt of Flame, a Turkish film of a book of the same name by Halide Edib Adıvar.
- a specific form of the poison dress trope in folklore that burned the victim.
  - Glauce was given a cursed robe by Medea that "consumed [her] with fierce fire along with her father".
  - King Arthur was given a cursed mantle by Morgan Le Fey in "Chapter XVI" . Le Morte d'Arthur – via Wikisource.
- a particular type of clothing given to people about to face burning at the stake.
