= Dragon (Ninurta) =

Hero in Sumerian mythology

The Dragon (Sumerian: Ušum or Ushum) was one of the warriors slain by Ninurta, patron god of Lagash, in Sumerian religion. Its body was hung on the seat of his chariot according to the ancient source.

== See also ==
- Anzû, a massive bird whose death was sometimes credited to Ninurta
- Bašmu ("venomous serpent"), killed by Ninurta
- Mušmaḫḫū ("distinguished serpent"), killed by Ninurta
- Seven-headed serpent, killed by Ninurta
- Ušumgallu ("great serpent")
