= Frostgrave =

Board game designed by Joseph A. McCullough

- Designers: Joseph McCullough
- Illustrators: Dmitry Burmak
- Publishers: Osprey Games
- Publication: 2015; 11 years ago
- Genres: Wargame
- Players: 2–8
- Playing time: 60–120 minutes
- Age range: 12+

Frostgrave is a fantasy miniatures wargame designed by Joseph A. McCullough and published by Osprey Games in 2015.

== Gameplay ==
Frostgrave is a fantasy wargame in which wizards battle each other. Combat is primarily resolved through the use of 20 sided dice. A key feature of Frostgrave is the bestiary where if all players agree a random encounter table is consulted and an uncontrolled creature may enter the battlefield.

== Reception ==
William Niebling for ICv2 gave Frostgrave: Ulterior Motives 4 out of 5 stars and said that "Ulterior Motives expands Frostgrave in a way that makes it even more fun to play, without bogging down the game with a lot of fiddly new rules, and without undermining the core elements that make the game unique."

=== Awards ===
- UK Games Expo – Best Miniatures Game 2015
- Beasts of War – Best Miniatures Game 2015
- Silver ENNIE – Miniature Product of the Year 2016
- Origins Awards Nominee – Miniatures Game of the Year 2016
