= Lernaean Hydra =

Snake-monster in Greek and Roman mythology

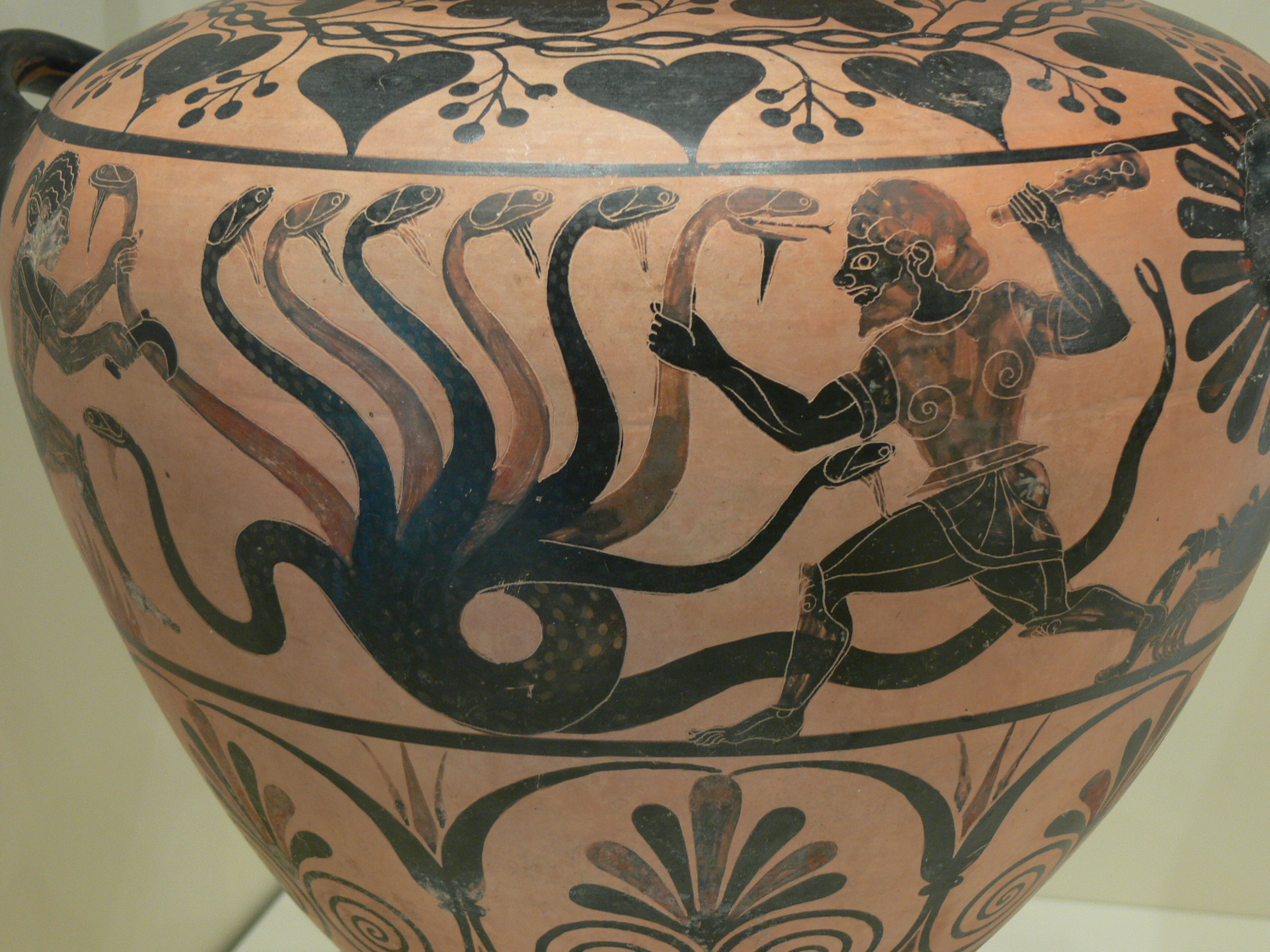
- Caeretan black-figure hydria (c. 346 BC)

Creature information
- Family: Child of Typhon and Echidna
- Folklore: Greek mythology

Origin
- Country: Greece
- Region: Lerna

The Lernaean Hydra or Hydra of Lerna (Ancient Greek: Λερναῖα ὕδρα, romanized: Lernaîa Húdrā), more often known simply as the Hydra, is a serpentine lake monster in Greek mythology and Roman mythology. Its lair was the lake of Lerna in the Argolid, which was also the site of the myth of the Danaïdes. Lerna was reputed to be an entrance to the Underworld, and archaeology has established it as a sacred site older than Mycenaean Argos. In the canonical Hydra myth, the monster is killed by Heracles (Hercules) as the second of his Twelve Labours.

According to Hesiod, the Hydra was the offspring of Typhon and Echidna. It had poisonous breath and blood so virulent that even its scent was deadly. The Hydra possessed many heads, the exact number of which varies according to the source. Later versions of the Hydra story add a regeneration feature to the monster: for every head chopped off, the Hydra would regrow two heads. Heracles required the assistance of his nephew Iolaus to cut off all of the monster's heads and burn the neck using a sword and fire.

In ancient Greece, the proverbial expression Ὕδραν τέμνειν, meaning 'cutting off a hydra,' was used to describe tasks that are hopeless or endlessly futile, drawing from the myth of the Hydra's regenerative heads.

== Development of the myth ==
The oldest extant Hydra narrative appears in Hesiod's Theogony, while the oldest images of the monster are found on a pair of bronze fibulae dating to c. 700 BC. In both these sources, the main motifs of the Hydra myth are already present: a multi-headed serpent that is slain by Heracles and Iolaus. While these fibulae portray a six-headed Hydra, its number of heads was first fixed in writing by Alcaeus (c. 600 BC), who gave it nine heads. Simonides, writing a century later, increased the number to fifty, while Euripides, Virgil, and others did not give an exact figure. Heraclitus the Paradoxographer rationalized the myth by suggesting that the Hydra would have been a single-headed snake accompanied by its offspring.

Like the initial number of heads, the monster's capacity to regenerate lost heads varies with time and author. The first mention of this ability of the Hydra occurs with Euripides, where the monster grew back a pair of heads for each one severed by Heracles. In the Euthydemus of Plato, Socrates likens Euthydemus and his brother Dionysidorus to a Hydra of a sophistical nature who grows two arguments for every one refuted. Palaephatus, Ovid, and Diodorus Siculus concur with Euripides, while Servius has the Hydra grow back three heads each time; the Suda does not give a number. Depictions of the monster dating to c. 500 BC show it with a double tail as well as multiple heads, suggesting the same regenerative ability at work, but no literary accounts have this feature.

The Hydra had many parallels in ancient Near Eastern religions. In particular, Sumerian, Babylonian, and Assyrian mythology celebrated the deeds of the war and hunting god Ninurta, whom the Angim credited with slaying 11 monsters on an expedition to the mountains, including a seven-headed serpent (possibly identical with the Mushmahhu) and Bashmu, whose constellation (despite having a single Head) was later associated by the Greeks with the Hydra. The constellation is also sometimes associated in Babylonian contexts with Marduk's dragon, the Mushhushshu.

== Second Labor of Heracles ==
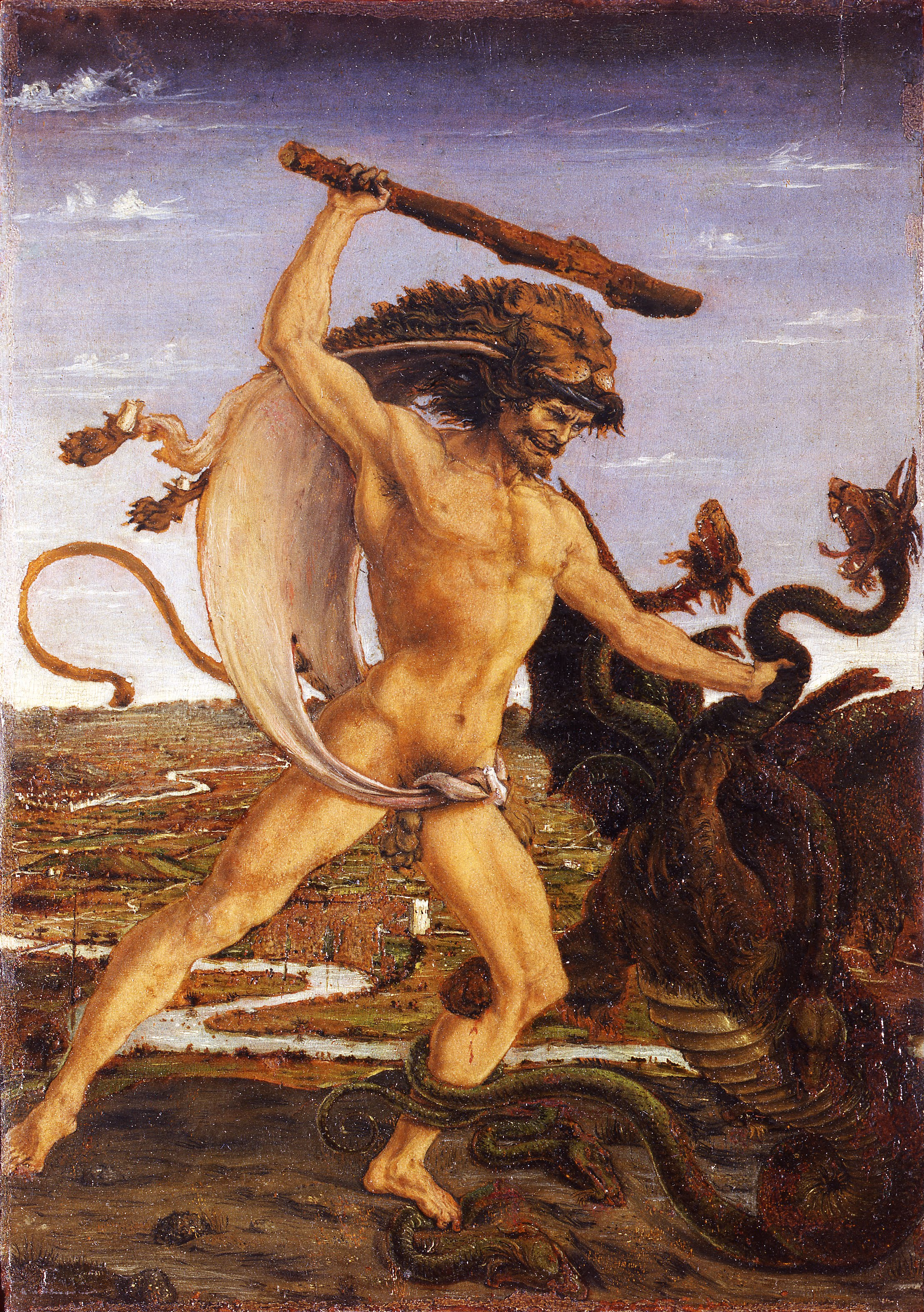
Pollaiuolo's Hercules and the Hydra (c. 1475). Uffizi Gallery, Florence, Italy

Eurystheus, the king of the Tiryns, sent Heracles (or Hercules) to slay the Hydra, which Hera had raised just to slay Heracles. Upon reaching the swamp near Lake Lerna, where the Hydra dwelt, Heracles covered his mouth and nose with a cloth to protect himself from the poisonous fumes. He shot flaming arrows into the Hydra's lair, the spring of Amymone, a deep cave from which it emerged only to terrorize neighboring villages. He then confronted the Hydra, wielding either a harvesting sickle (according to some early vase-paintings), a sword, or his famed club. Heracles then attempted to cut off the Hydra's heads but each time that he did so, one or two more heads (depending on the source) would grow back in its place. The Hydra was invulnerable as long as it retained at least one head.

The struggle is described by the mythographer Apollodorus: realizing that he could not defeat the Hydra in this way, Heracles called on his nephew Iolaus for help. His nephew then came upon the idea (possibly inspired by Athena) of using a firebrand to scorch the neck stumps after each decapitation. Heracles cut off each head and Iolaus cauterized the open stumps. Seeing that Heracles was winning the struggle, Hera sent a giant crab to distract him. He crushed it under his mighty foot. The Hydra's one immortal head was cut off with a golden sword given to Heracles by Athena. Heracles placed the head—still alive and writhing—under a great rock on the sacred way between Lerna and Elaius, and dipped his arrows in the Hydra's poisonous blood. Thus, his second task was complete.

The alternate version of this myth is that after cutting off one head he then dipped his sword in its neck and used its venom to burn each head so it could not grow back. Hera, upset that Heracles had slain the beast she raised to kill him, placed it in the dark blue vault of the sky as the constellation Hydra. She then turned the crab into the constellation Cancer.

Heracles would later use arrows dipped in the Hydra's poisonous blood to kill other foes during his remaining labors, such as Stymphalian Birds, the giant Geryon, and the dragon Ladon. He later used one to kill the centaur Nessus; and Nessus' tainted blood was applied to the Tunic of Nessus, by which the centaur had his posthumous revenge. Both Strabo and Pausanias report that the stench of the river Anigrus in Elis, making all the fish of the river inedible, was reputed to be due to the Hydra's poison, washed from the arrows Heracles used on the centaur.

== Constellation ==
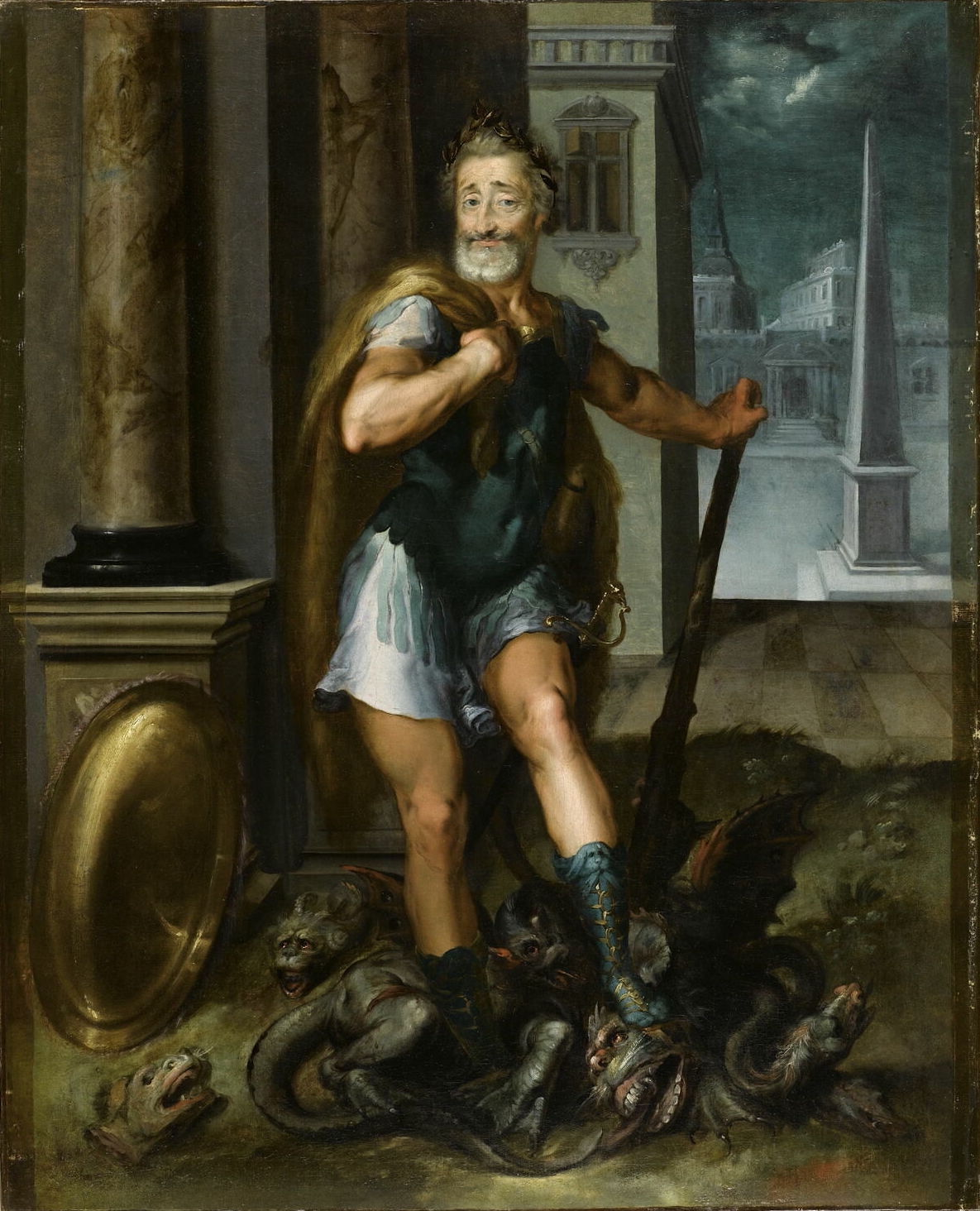
Portrait of Henri IV as Hercules pinning the Hydra of Lerna, an allegory of the Navarrese king's defeat of the Catholic League during the French Wars of Religion. Workshop of Toussaint Dubreuil, c. 1600.

Greek and Roman writers related that Hera placed the Hydra and crab as constellations in the night sky after Heracles slew him. When the sun is in the sign of Cancer (Latin for "The Crab"), the constellation Hydra has its head nearby. In fact, both constellations derived from the earlier Babylonian signs: Bashmu ("The Venomous Snake") and Alluttu ("The Crayfish").

== In art ==
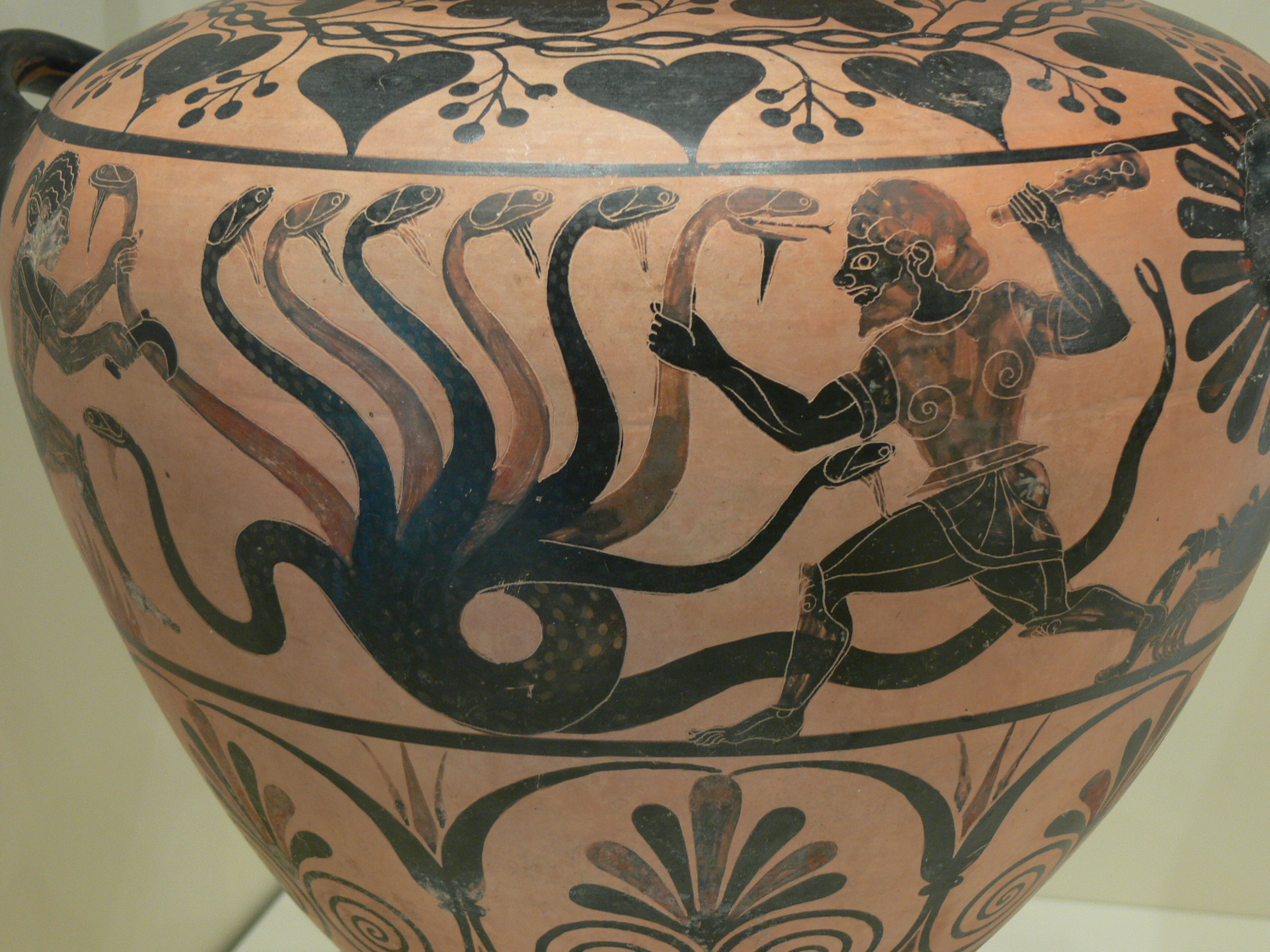
Caeretan black-figure hydria (c. 346 BC)

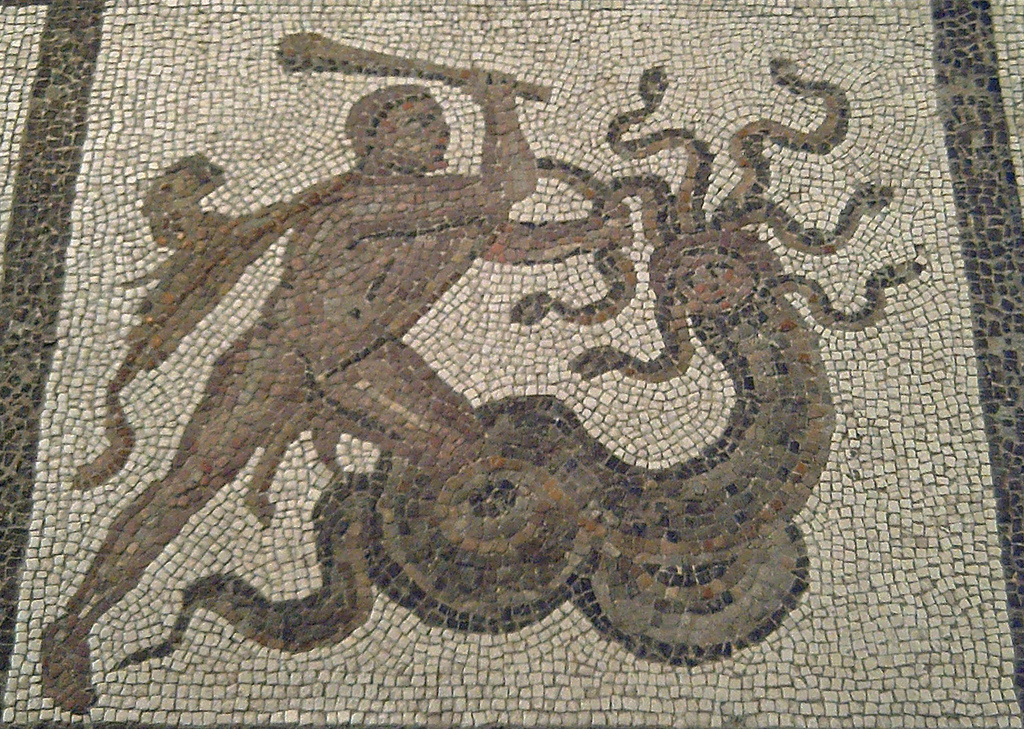
Mosaic from Roman Spain (AD 26)

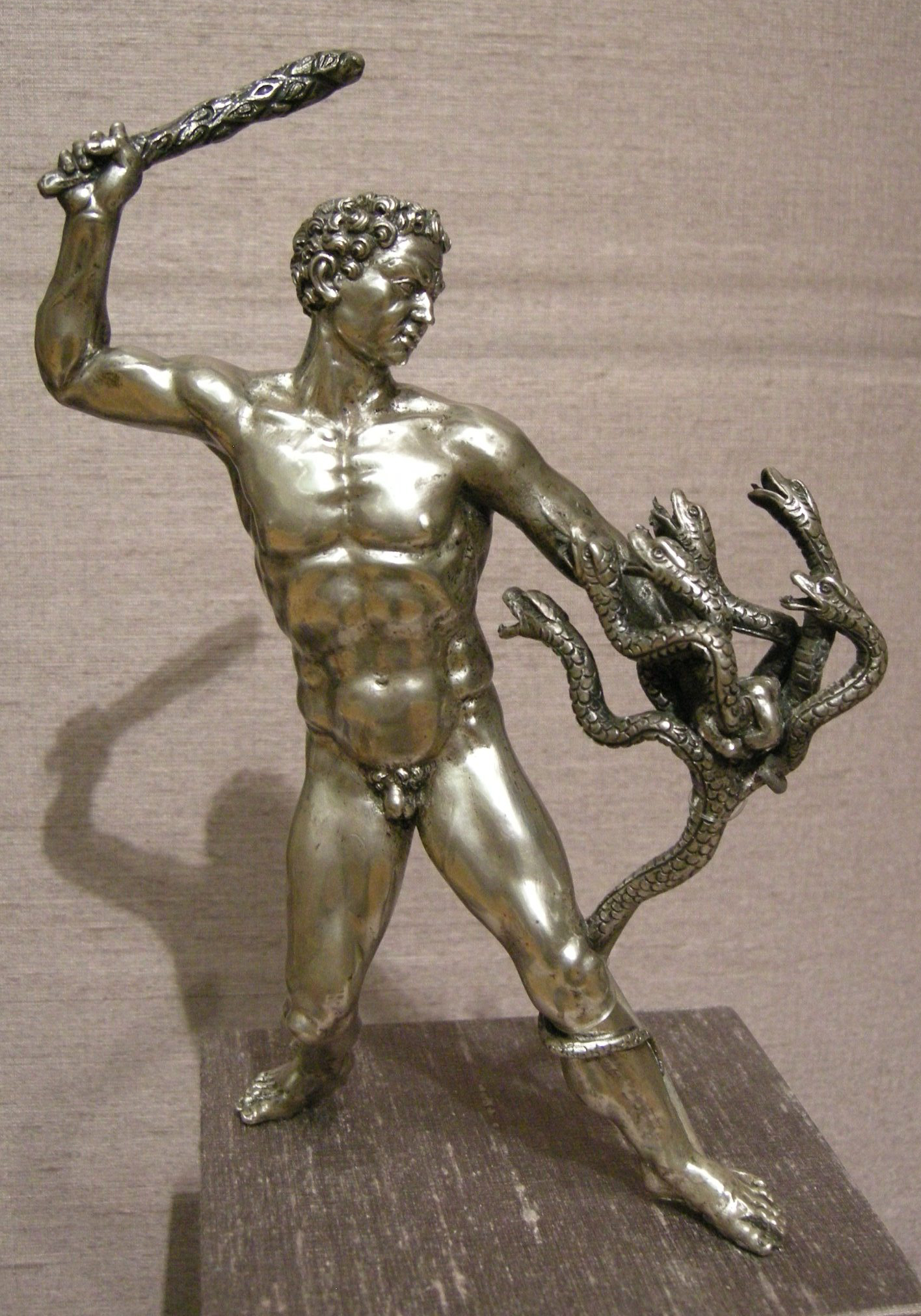
Silver sculpture (1530s)

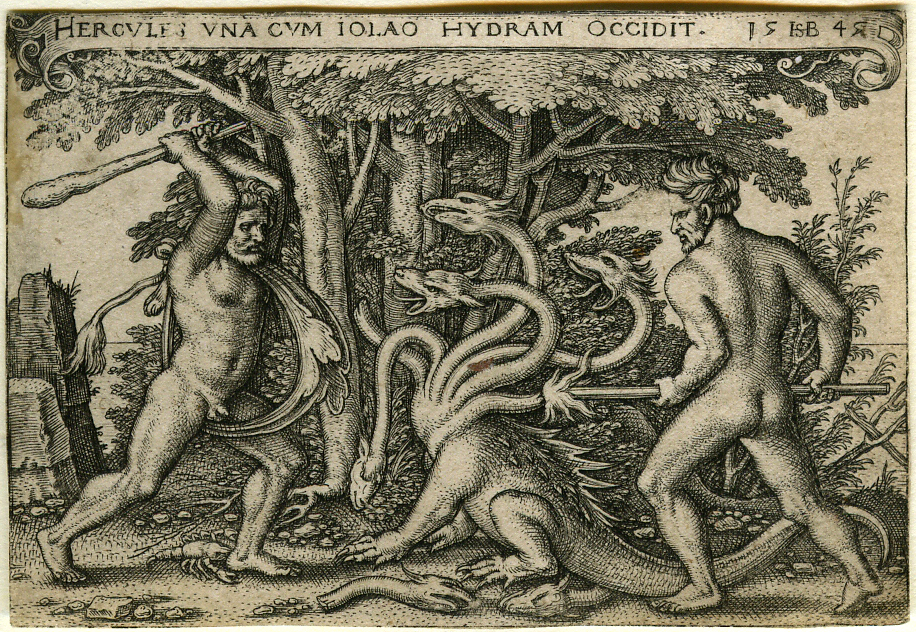
Engraving (1) by Hans Sebald Beham

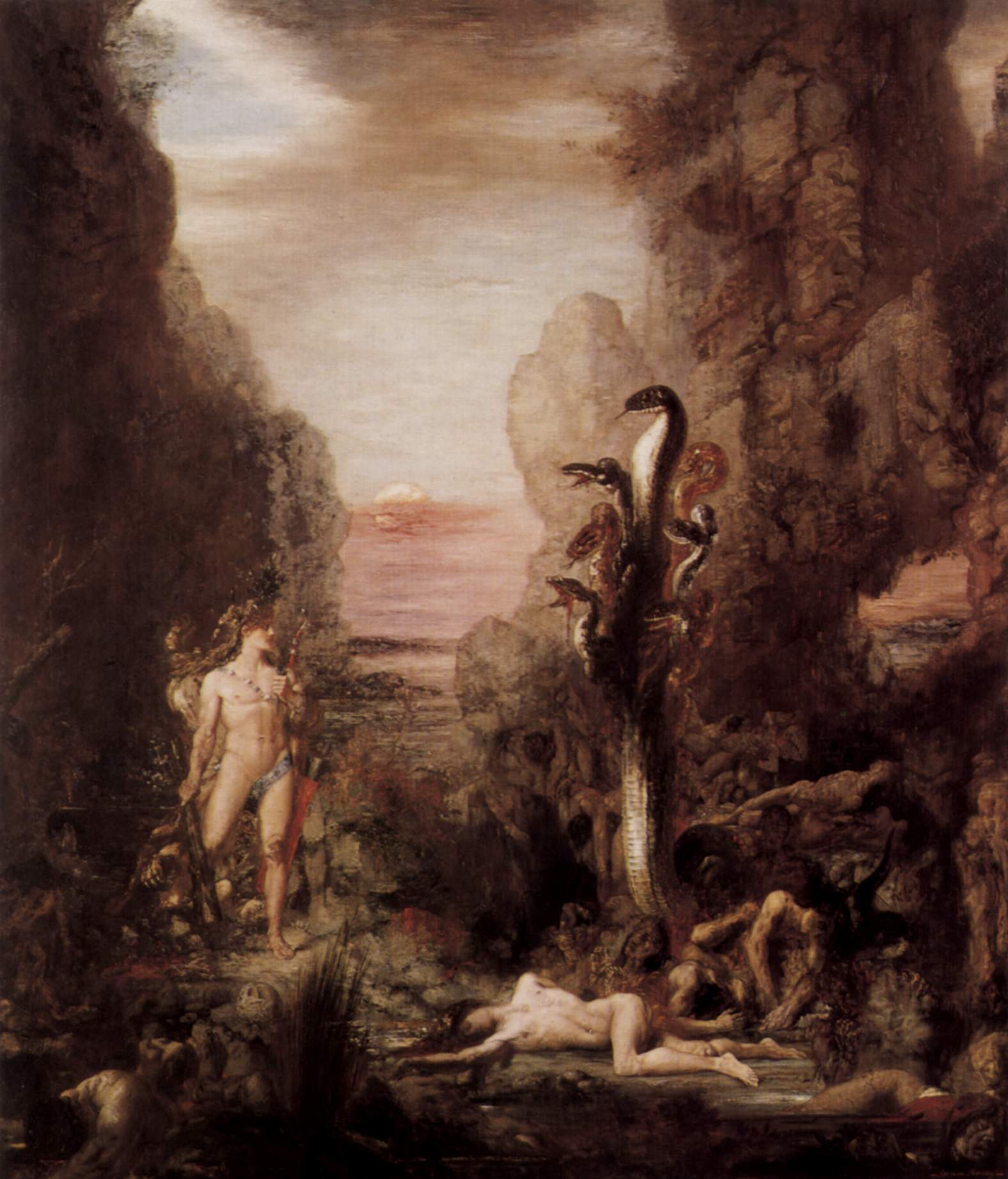
Gustave Moreau (1861)

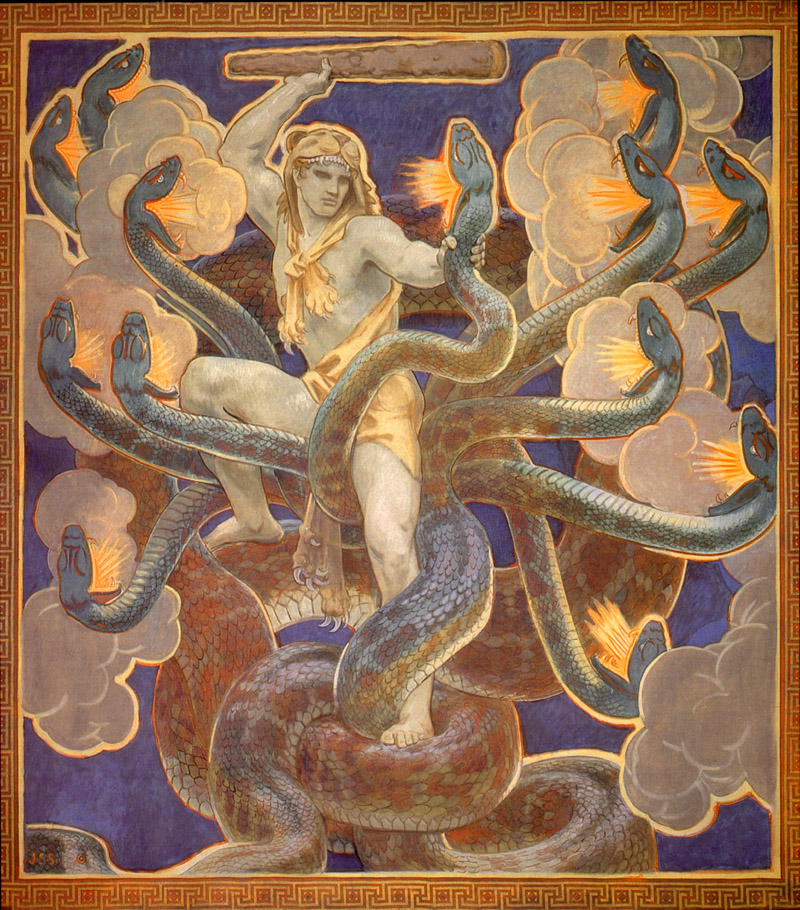
John Singer Sargent (1921)

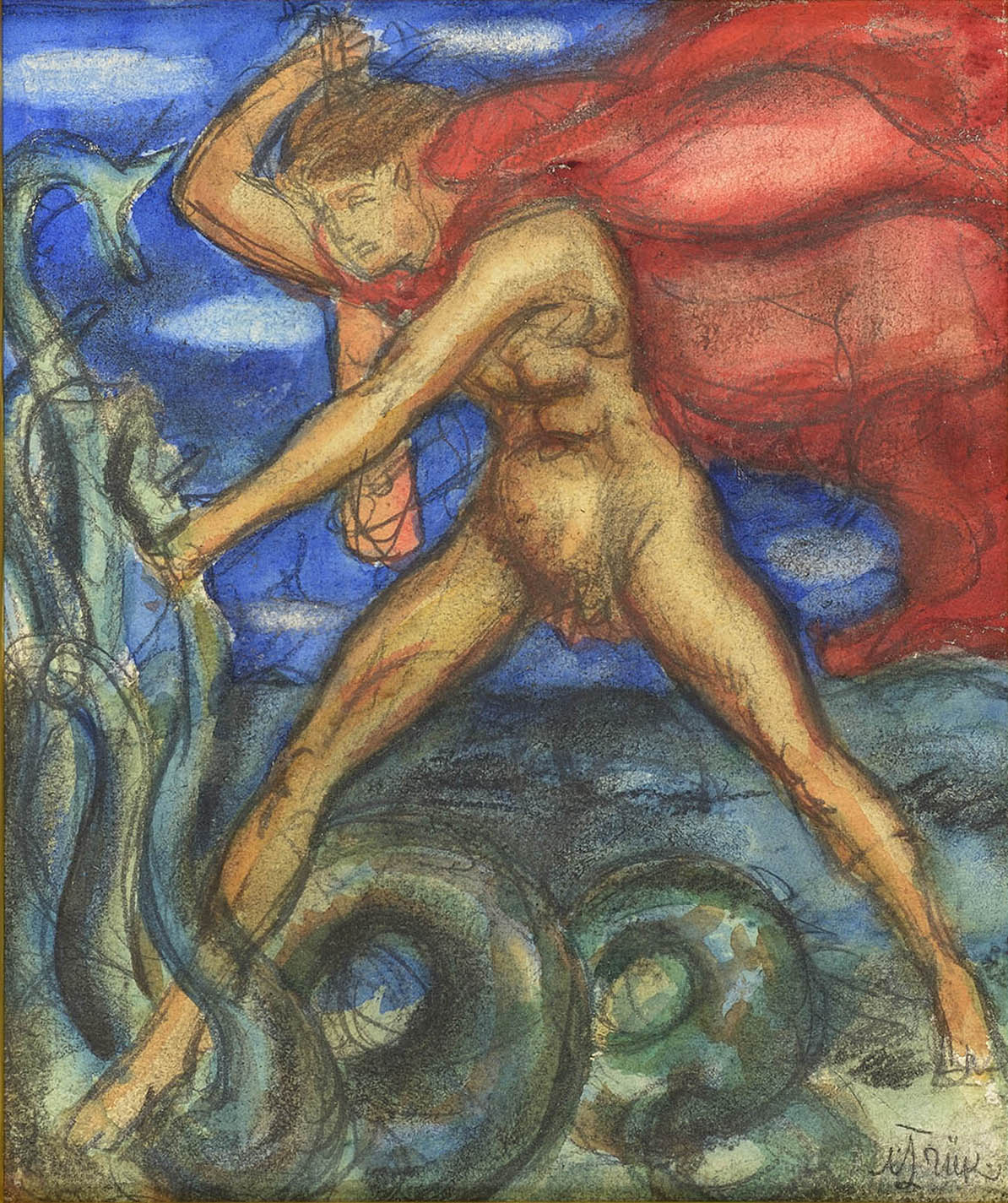
A modern version by Nikolai Triik

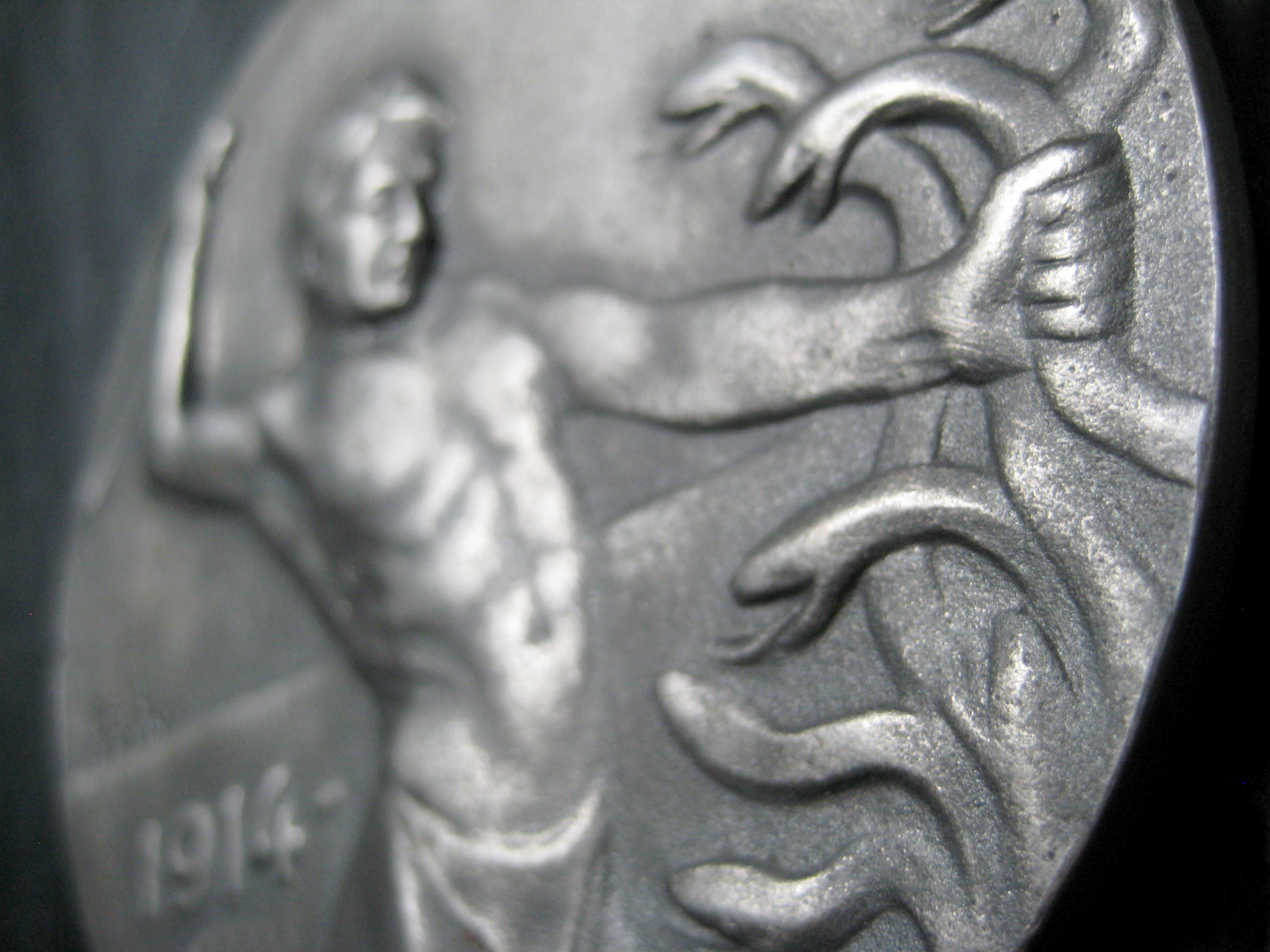
Reverse of a 1914 medal by Fritz Eue commemorating General Erich Ludendorff

== See also ==
- Basilisk
- Feathered Serpent
- Horned Serpent
- Prehistoric snakes
- Python (mythology)
- Scylla
- Snakes in mythology
- Titanoboa
- Yamata no Orochi

== General and cited references ==
- Apollodorus, Apollodorus, The Library, with an English Translation by Sir James George Frazer, F.B.A., F.R.S. in 2 Volumes. Cambridge, Massachusetts, Harvard University Press; London, William Heinemann Ltd. 1921. ISBN 0-674-99135-4. Online version at the Perseus Digital Library.
- Burkert, Walter (1985). Greek Religion. Harvard University Press.
- Grimal, Pierre (1986). The Dictionary of Classical Mythology. E.P. Dutton & Co., Inc.
- Harrison, Jane Ellen (1903). Prolegomena to the Study of Greek Religion.
- Hesiod, Theogony, in The Homeric Hymns and Homerica with an English Translation by Hugh G. Evelyn-White, Cambridge, MA., Harvard University Press; London, William Heinemann Ltd. 1914. Online version at the Perseus Digital Library.
- Hyginus, Gaius Julius, The Myths of Hyginus. Edited and translated by Mary A. Grant, Lawrence: University of Kansas Press, 1960.
- Kerenyi, Carl (1959). The Heroes of the Greeks.
- Ogden, Daniel (2013). Drakon: Dragon Myth and Serpent Cult in the Greek and Roman Worlds. Oxford University Press. ISBN 9780199557325.
- Piccardi, Luigi (2005). The head of the Hydra of Lerna (Greece). Archaeopress, British Archaeological Reports, International Series N° 1337/2005, 179-186.
- Ruck, Carl; Staples, Danny (1994). The World of Classical Myth.
