= Joseph A. McCullough =

Wargame Designer

Joseph A. McCullough is a tabletop wargames designer, and writer from Greensboro, North Carolina, who now lives in Kent, UK.

He is most well known for Frostgrave, a fantasy miniatures game where the player has control over a powerful wizard and their soldiers.

== Early life and education ==
Joseph A. McCullough was born in 1976 in Greensboro, North Carolina. McCullough grew up watching science-fiction such as Star Trek and Star Wars. McCullough graduated with a degree in history from the University of North Carolina.

== Career ==
McCullough lived in Washington, D.C. where he wrote for a medical journal and worked in a gaming store. McCullough went to North Wales to study for a creative writing degree from Bangor University, although he did not finish the degree. McCullough got married while in England and stayed there to work for the military history publisher Osprey Publishing, working in production, marketing, editorial, and games for 15 years before becoming a freelancer full-time.

McCullough has written for Black Gate. McCullough wrote or co-wrote books for the Dark Osprey line including Steampunk Soldiers: Uniforms & Weapons from the Age of Steam, Steampunk Soldiers: The American Frontier, and Zombies: A Hunter's Guide. McCullough became Project Manager for the Osprey Adventures imprint of Osprey Publishing in 2011. McCullough wrote Dragonslayers, the first book in the Myths and Legends line from Osprey. McCullough edited the 2015 anthology Frostgrave: Tales of the Frozen City.

== Miniature wargames ==
- Frostgrave: Fantasy Wargames in the Frozen City.
- Rangers of Shadow Deep: A Tabletop Adventure Game.
- Stargrave: Fantasy Wargames in the Ravaged Galaxy.
- Oathmark: Battles of the Lost Age
- The Silver Bayonet: A wargame of Napoleonic Gothic Horror
- Frostgrave: Ghost Archipelago - Fantasy Wargaming in the Lost Isles
- Deathship One
- Operation: Last Train
- Hairfoot Jousting

== Books ==
=== Fiction ===
- Victory's Knife

=== Non-fiction ===
- Steampunk Soldiers
- Steampunk Soldiers: The American Frontier
- Zombies: A hunter's guide.
- Dragonslayers: From Beowulf to St. George.
- The Science-Fiction & Fantasy Quizbook
- The Story of Santa Claus
- The Military History Quizbook
- The Civil War Quizbook
- A pocket History of Ireland

== Awards ==
=== Frostgrave ===
- UK Games Expo – Best Miniatures Game 2015
- Beasts of War – Best Miniatures Game 2015
- Silver ENNIE – Miniature Product of the Year 2016
- Origins Awards Nominee – Miniatures Game of the Year 2016
- Wargames Illustrated – Best Rules 2019
- Bleeding Cool – Best Tabletop Miniature Game 2018 and No. 2 Tabletop Game of 2018.
- Drive Thru Review – Top 50 Games of All Time #4
- Rob's Tabletop World – Top 10 Non-GW Miniature Games #1

=== Frostgrave: Perilous Dark ===
- UK Games Expo – Judge's Award for Best Miniature Rules 2020
- UK Games Expo – People's Choice Award for Best Miniature Rules 2020

=== Stargrave ===
- UK Games Expo – Judge's Award for Best Miniature Rules 2021
- UK Games Expo – People's Choice Award for Best Miniatures Rules 2021
- Tabletop Gaming Live – Best Miniatures Game 2022

=== Oathmark ===
- Tabletop Gaming Live – Best Wargame 2022

=== The Silver Bayonet ===
- UK Games Expo – Judge's Award for Best Miniature Rules 2022
- UK Games Expo – People's Choice Award for Best Miniatures Rules 2022

=== Rangers of Shadow Deep ===
- DriveThruRPG – Mithral Best Seller
- Guerrilla Miniature Games – Top 5 New Games of 2018
- Drive Thru Review – Top 50 Games of All Time #3
- Drive Thru Review – #1 Solo Game
