= Shirt of Nessus =

Poisoned shirt in Greek mythology

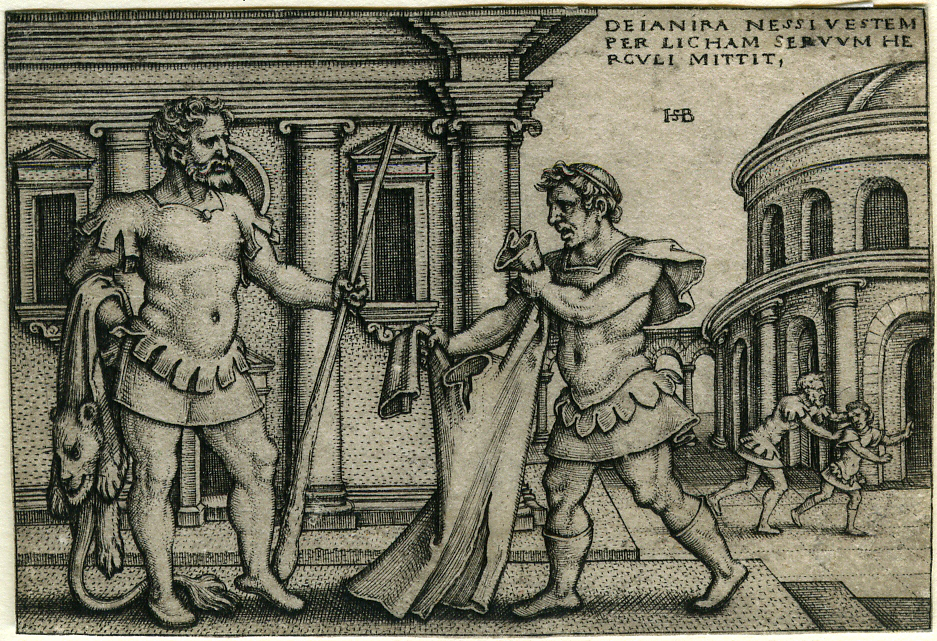
Lichas bringing the garment of Nessus to Hercules (as Heracles was known in Roman mythology), woodcut by Hans Sebald Beham, circa 1542–1548.

In Greek mythology, the Shirt of Nessus, Tunic of Nessus, Nessus-robe, or Nessus' shirt (Ancient Greek: Χιτών τοῦ Νέσσου, romanized: Chitṓn toû Néssou) was the poisoned shirt (chiton) that killed Heracles. It was once a popular reference in literature. In folkloristics, it is considered an instance of the "poison dress" motif.

== Mythology ==
Fearing that Heracles had taken a new lover in Iole, his wife Deianeira gives him the garment, which was stained with the blood of the centaur Nessus. She had been tricked by the dying Nessus into believing it would serve as a potion to ensure her husband's faithfulness. In fact, it contained the venom of the Lernaean Hydra with which Heracles had poisoned the arrow he used to kill Nessus. When Heracles puts it on, the Hydra's venom begins to cook him alive, and to escape this unbearable pain he builds a funeral pyre and throws himself on it.

Metaphorically, it represents "a source of misfortune from which there is no escape; a fatal present; anything that wounds the susceptibilities" or a "destructive or expiatory force or influence".

== Historical references ==
=== Hitler plot ===
Major-General Henning von Tresckow, one of the primary conspirators in the July 20 plot to assassinate Adolf Hitler, referred to the "Robe of Nessus" following the realization that the assassination plot had failed and that he and others involved in the conspiracy would die as a result: "None of us can complain about our own deaths. Everyone who joined our circle put on the 'Robe of Nessus'." Tresckow himself, echoing Heracles, committed suicide by grenade on the Eastern Front, shortly after the failure of the putsch.

== References in literature ==
=== John Barth ===
The Shirt of Nessus (1952) is the master's thesis of the noted American postmodern novelist John Barth. Written for the Writing Seminars program at Johns Hopkins, which Barth himself later ran, The Shirt of Nessus is in the form of a short novel or novella. It is his first full-length fictional work, but little is known of its content. Barth has revealed himself to be embarrassed by most of his unpublished work before The Floating Opera. The Shirt of Nessus is briefly referenced in both of Barth's nonfiction collections, The Friday Book and Further Fridays. The only known copies not held by the author were kept in the Johns Hopkins and the Writing Seminars libraries, but the Writing Seminars copy disappeared in the mid-1960s, and other has also disappeared. Some Johns Hopkins faculty members who know Barth speculate that he may have removed them. Indeed, when the special collections division notified Barth in 2002 (when the volume was first found to be missing), Barth responded that he "was not altogether unhappy the library no longer had a copy". However, the novelist and scholar David Morell in his John Barth: An Introduction, notes that he has a copy.

=== Robert Duncan ===
In the "Introduction" to Bending the Bow: "Pound sought coherence in The Cantos and comes in Canto 116 to lament 'and I cannot make it cohere.' But the 'SPLENDOUR, IT ALL COHERES' of the poet's Herakles in The Women of Trachis is a key or recognition of a double meaning that turns in the lock of the Nessus shirt."

In Audit/Poetry IV.3, issue featuring Robert Duncan, in his long polemic with Robin Blaser's translation of The Chimeras of Gérard de Nerval, which Duncan believes deliberately and fatally omit the mystical and gnostic overtones of the original, Duncan writes: "The mystical doctrine of neo-Pythagorean naturalism has become like a Nessus shirt to the translator, and in the translation we hear Heracles' tortured cry from Pound's version of the Women of Trachis from Sophokles: 'it all coheres.'"

=== Hyam Plutzik ===
In Hyam Plutzik's poem "Portrait", which appears in his collection Apples From Shinar, the poet writes of a Jewish-American character in the late 1950s who has successfully assimilated, and is able to "ignore the monster, the mountain—/A few thousand years of history." Except for one problem, "one ill-fitting garment…The shirt, the borrowed shirt, /The Greek shirt." The last line reveals the "Greek shirt" is "a shirt by Nessus."

=== Other appearances in fiction ===
- In James Branch Cabell's Jurgen, the title character dons the shirt of Nessus and is transported by it on his travels, in the end of the story he is allowed to take it off, in contradiction to the usual conventions.
- Lucy Larcom's anti-war and anti-slavery ballad "Weaving" is a soliloquy of a northern factory woman working at her loom who compares the cloth she weaves with a Nessus-robe for the Southern slave women who suffered to produce the cotton.
- In Alexandre Dumas' The Count of Monte Cristo, the royal prosecutor, M. Gerard de Villefort is referenced to have, after being exposed of his crimes, "threw aside his magisterial robe because it was an unbearable burden, a veritable garb of Nessus, insatiate in torture."
- In Edith Wharton’s Glimpses of the Moon, Nick Lansing feels enveloped “in the Nessus-shirt of his memories” when in Paris preparing to divorce his wife, Suzy Lansing.

=== References in non-fiction ===
- The Shirt of Nessus is a 1956 non-fiction book dealing with anti-Nazi groups in Germany during World War II.
- The Polish dissident writer Jan Józef Lipski published a collection of essays called Tunika Nessosa ("The Shirt of Nessos"), dealing with, and critical of, Polish Catholic nationalism. Lipski called nationalism the shirt of Nessos, which destroys the cultural genius of a nation.
- Uri Avnery has compared the territories occupied by Israel after the Six-Day War to the Shirt of Nessus.
- In The Spiritual Problem of Modern Man, Carl Jung describes the discovery of the unconscious mind as "...a Shirt of Nessus which we cannot strip off." He argues that both the modern individual and society are forced to integrate knowledge of the unconscious with current models of being that do not account for the existence of unconscious motives and contents. He proposes that this is an unavoidable task with catastrophic consequences, such as the First World War, underscoring the inescapable effects of the poisonous Shirt of Nessus.

== Bibliography ==
- Baughman, Ernest W., Type and Motif Index of the Folktales of England and North America, Walter De Gruyter, June 1966. ISBN 90-279-0046-9.
- Mayor, Adrienne, "The Nessus Shirt in the New World: Smallpox Blankets in History and Legend," Journal of American Folklore 108:427:54 (1995).
