= Nessus (centaur) =

Centaur in Greek mythology

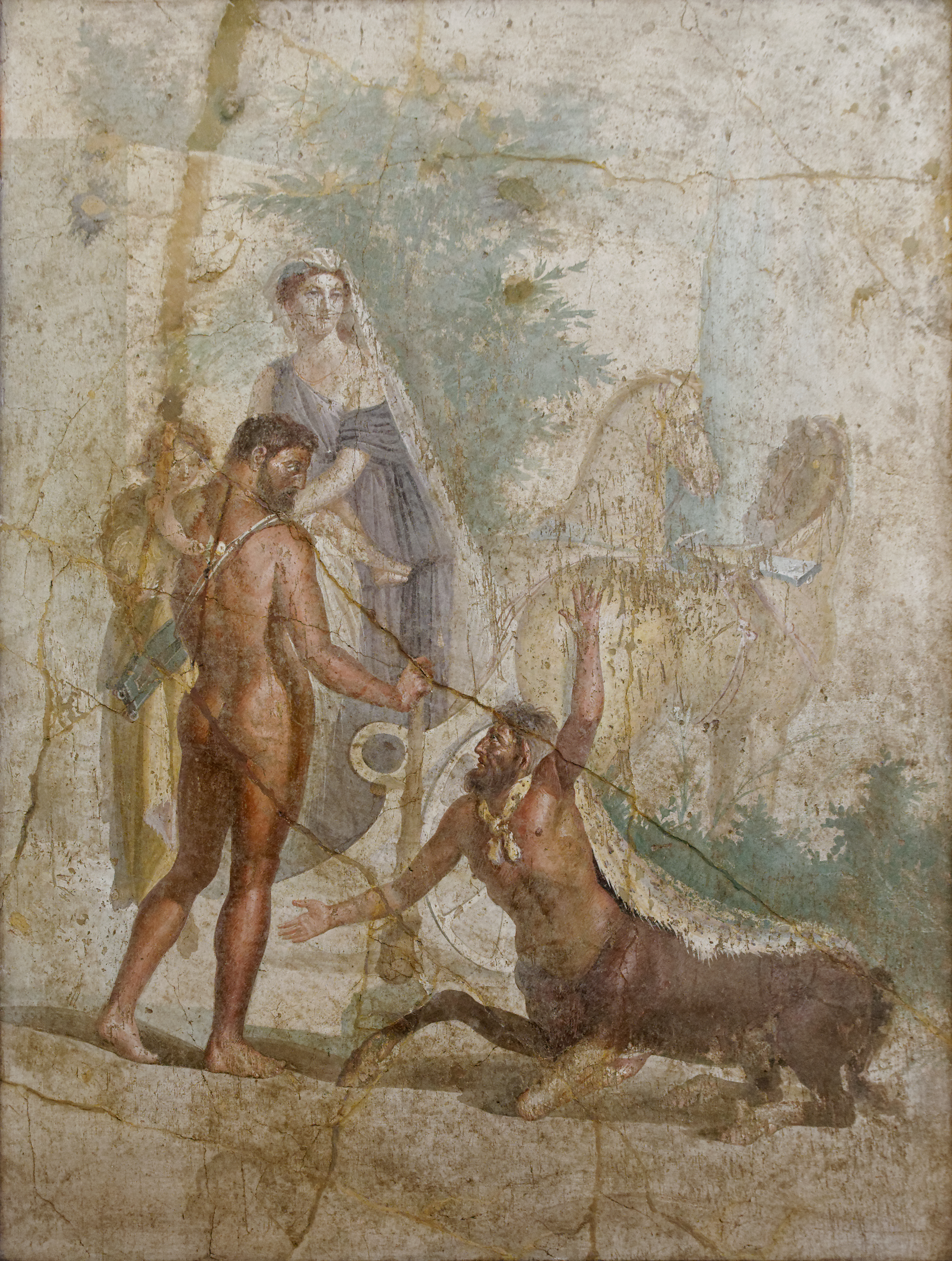
Heracles carrying his son Hyllus looks at the centaur Nessus, who is about to carry Deianira across the river on his back. Antique fresco from Pompeii

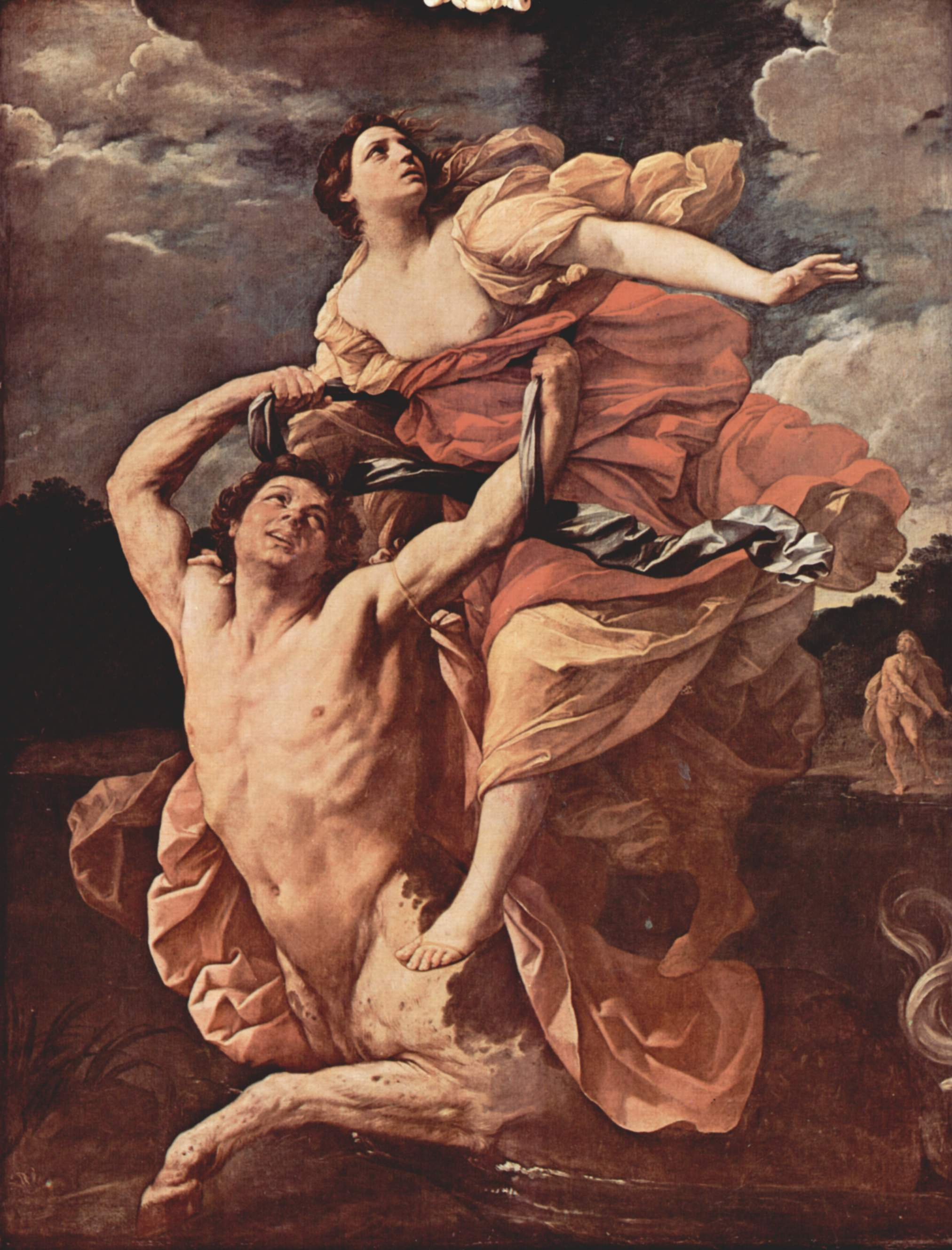
Guido Reni, Abduction of Deianira, 1620–21, Louvre Museum

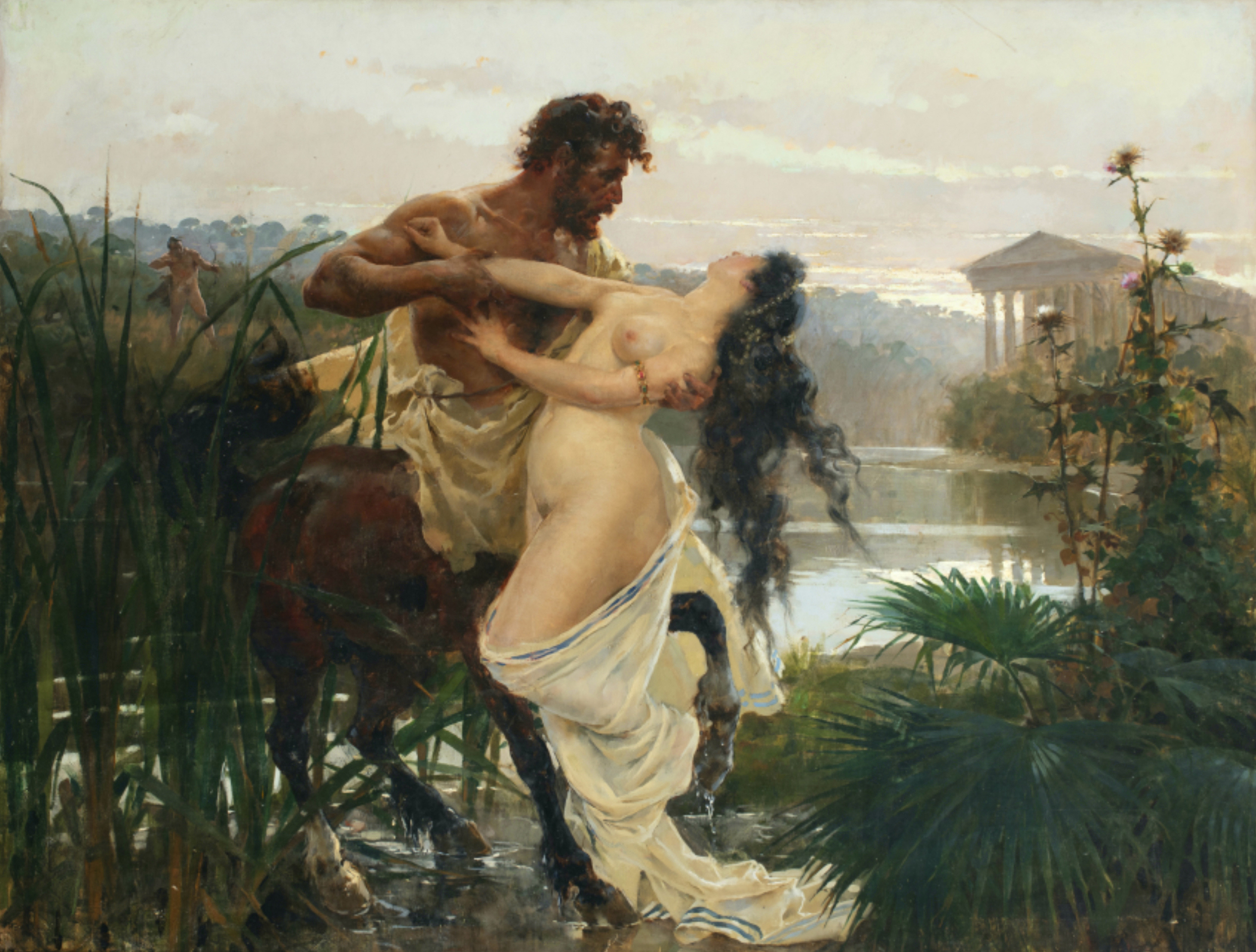
Enrique Simonet, Nessus and Deianira, 1888

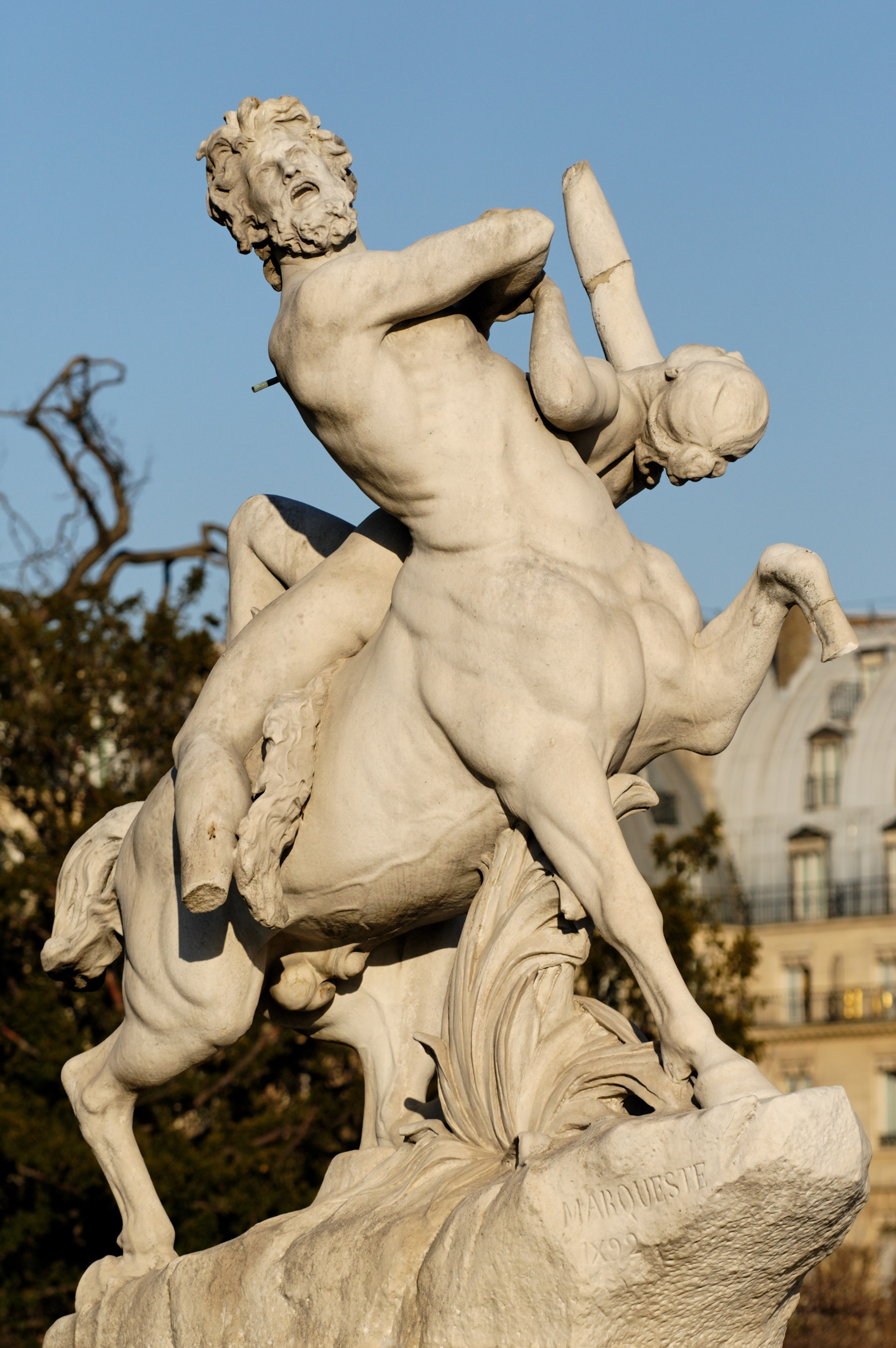
2006 picture of Laurent Marqueste's statue of Nessus struck by an arrow while carrying off Deianeira

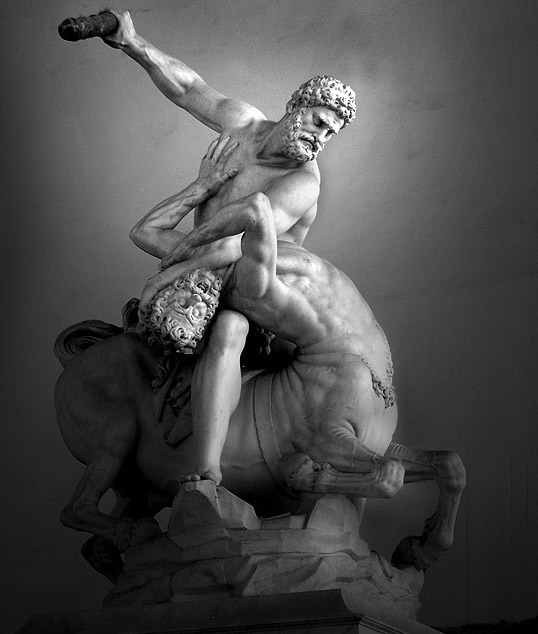
Heracles and Nessus by Giambologna (1599), Florence.

In Greek mythology, Nessus (Ancient Greek: Νέσσος, romanized: Nessos) was a famous centaur who was killed by Heracles, and whose poisoned blood in turn killed Heracles. He was the son of Centauros. He fought in the battle with the Lapiths and became a ferryman on the river Euenos.

== Mythology ==
Nessus is known for his famous role in the story of the Tunic of Nessus. After carrying Deianeira, the wife of Heracles, across the river, he attempted to have intercourse with her. Heracles saw this from across the river and shot a Hydra-poisoned arrow into Nessus's breast. As he lay dying, as a final act of malice, Nessus told Deianeira that his blood would ensure that Heracles would be true to her forever, knowing the blood to be infected with the hydra's poison.

Deianeira foolishly believed him. Later, when her trust began to wane because of Iole, she spread the centaur's blood on a robe and gave it to her husband. Heracles went to a gathering of heroes, where his passion got the better of him. Meanwhile, Deianeira accidentally spilled a portion of the centaur's blood onto the floor. To her horror, it began to fume by the light of the rising sun.

She instantly recognized it as poison and sent her messenger to warn Heracles but it was too late. Heracles lay dying slowly and painfully as the robe burned his skin—either in actual flames or by the heat of poison. He died a noble death on a funeral pyre of oak branches. Heracles was then taken to Mount Olympus by Zeus and welcomed among the gods for his heroic exploits.

A similar theme appears in certain versions of the story of Medea.

Sophocles' play Trachiniae (Women of Trachis) is extensively based on a retelling of this myth.

== Before the myth ==
Before the ancient Greeks told the story of Nessus and 'created' centaurs, the Kassites used them as guiding spirits. There may also be a connection to the origin of centaurs in this myth. One etymological explanation for centaur stems from the meaning water-whipper, or water spirit.

== In popular culture ==
- In Dante Alighieri's Inferno, Nessus is among the centaurs who patrol the outer rings of the Circle of Violence, making sure those immersed in the Phlegethon do not get out of their position. He was appointed by Chiron to guide Dante and Virgil alongside the Phlegethon.
- The episode is the basis for a section of T. S. Eliot's Four Quartets, Little Gidding, mirroring the greater theme of the poem.
- The story of Nessus, his love for Deianeira, the tunic and his death by an Hercules' arrow are loosely depicted in the television movie Hercules in the Underworld (1994), which preceded the series Hercules: The Legendary Journeys (1995–1999).

== Historical allusions ==
The Nessus Shirt story can be connected to real world events and figures of speech. It has been used as an allusion to the early settlers giving infected blankets to Native Americans.

== Bibliography ==
- F. Diez de Velasco, "Nessos", Lexicon Iconographicum Mythologiae Classicae, Munich-Zurich, Artemis Verlag, vol. VI,1, 1992, 838–847 & VI,2, 1992, 534–555.
