= Bašmu =

Ancient Mesopotamian mythological creature

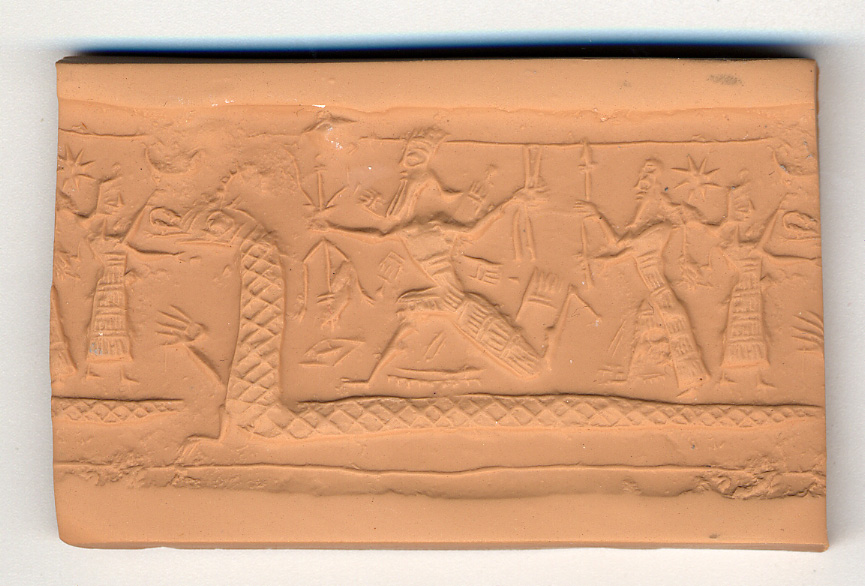
The Weather god, armed with lightning, fighting a Bašmu dragon, on a Neo-Assyrian cylinder seal (9th/8th Century BC)

Bašmu or Bashmu (Akkadian: 𒈲𒊮𒉣𒇬, romanized: bašmu; cuneiform: MUŠ.ŠÀ.TÙR or MUŠ.ŠÀ.TUR, lit. "Venomous Snake") was an ancient Mesopotamian mythological creature, a horned snake with two forelegs and wings. It was also the Akkadian name of the Babylonian constellation (MUL.DINGIR.MUŠ) equivalent to the Greek Hydra. The Sumerian terms ušum (portrayed with feet, see Ninurta's Dragon) and muš-šà-tùr ("birth goddess snake", portrayed without feet) may represent differing iconographic types or different demons. It is first attested by a 22nd-century BC cylinder inscription at Gudea.

== Mythology ==
In the Angim, or "Ninurta's return to Nippur", it was identified as one of the eleven "warriors" (ur-sag) defeated by Ninurta. Bašmu was created in the sea and was "sixty double-miles long", according to a fragmentary Assyrian myth which recounts that it devoured fish, birds, wild asses, and men, securing the disapproval of the gods who sent Nergal or Palil ("snake charmer") to vanquish it. It was one of the eleven monsters created by Tiamat in the Enuma Elish creation myth. It had "six mouths, seven tongues and seven ...-s on its belly".

== See also ==
- Hydra in Greek and Roman myth
- Seven-headed serpent in Sumerian myth
