= Creusa (daughter of Creon) =

Daughter of Creon in Greek mythology

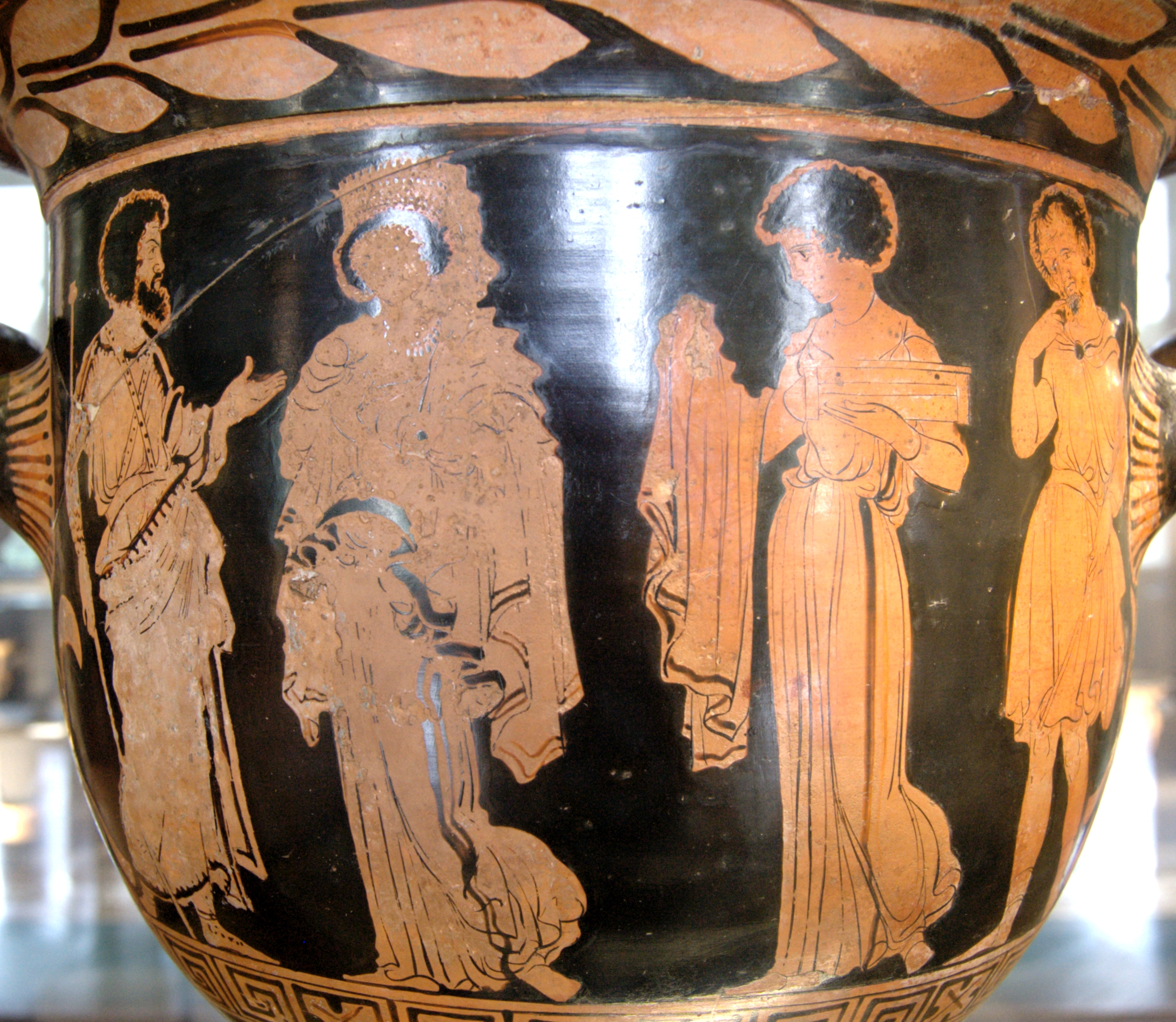
Presents from Medea to Creusa from a Lucanian red-figure bell-krater, ca. 390 BC. From Apulia. (Louvre Museum, Paris)

In Greek mythology, Creusa (/kriˈuːsə/; Ancient Greek: Κρέουσα Kreousa "princess" ) or Glauce (/ˈɡlɔːsi/; Γλαυκή "blue-gray"), Latin Glauca, was a princess of Corinth as the daughter of King Creon.

== Etymology ==
Glauce’s name derives from the Greek glaukós, meaning “bluish-grey”.

== Mythology ==
In favor of Creusa, Jason abandoned Medea. In the version of the myth commonly followed by ancient tragedians, Medea obtained her revenge by giving Creusa a dress and coronet that had been cursed by a sorceress. The curse caused the dress, or Shirt of Flame to stick to Creusa's body and burn her to death as soon as she put it on.

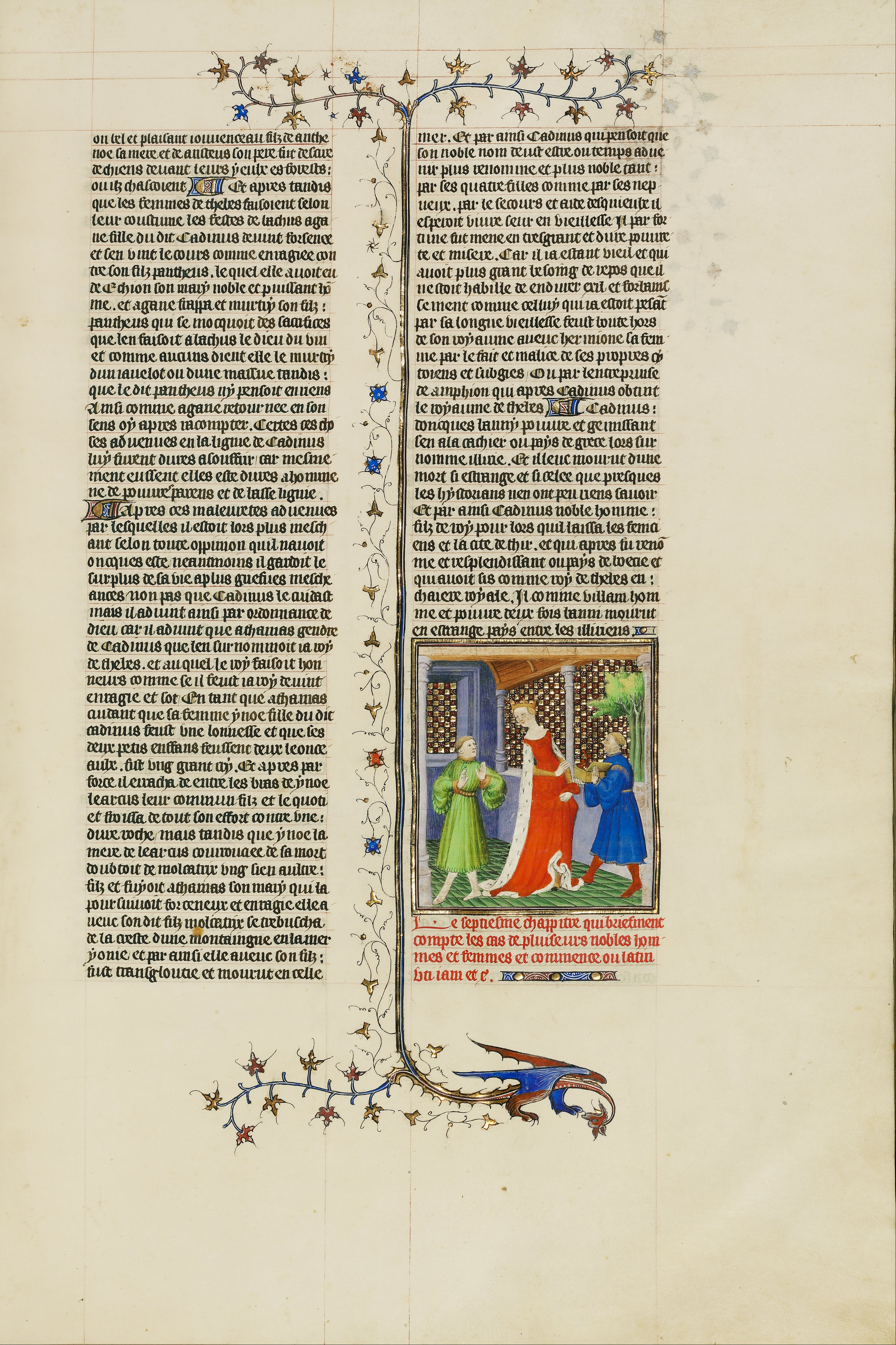
Creusa Receiving the Burning Jewelry from Medea

=== Hyginus' account ===
"To him [Jason], Creon, son of Menoecus, King of Corinth, gave his younger daughter Glauce as wife. When Medea saw that she, who had been Jason’s benefactress, was treated with scorn, with the help of poisonous drugs she made a golden crown, and she bade her sons give it as a gift to their stepmother. Creusa took the gift, and was burned to death along with Jason and Creon."

=== Pseudo-Apollodorus' account ===
"They [Jason and Medea] went to Corinth, and lived there happily for ten years, till Creon, king of Corinth, betrothed his daughter Glauce to Jason, who married her and divorced Medea. But she invoked the gods by whom Jason had sworn, and after often upbraiding him with his ingratitude she sent the bride a robe steeped in poison, which when Glauce had put on, she was consumed with fierce fire along with her father, who went to her rescue."
