= Creon (king of Corinth) =

Adoptive father of Amphilocus and Tisiphone; figure in the legend of Jason

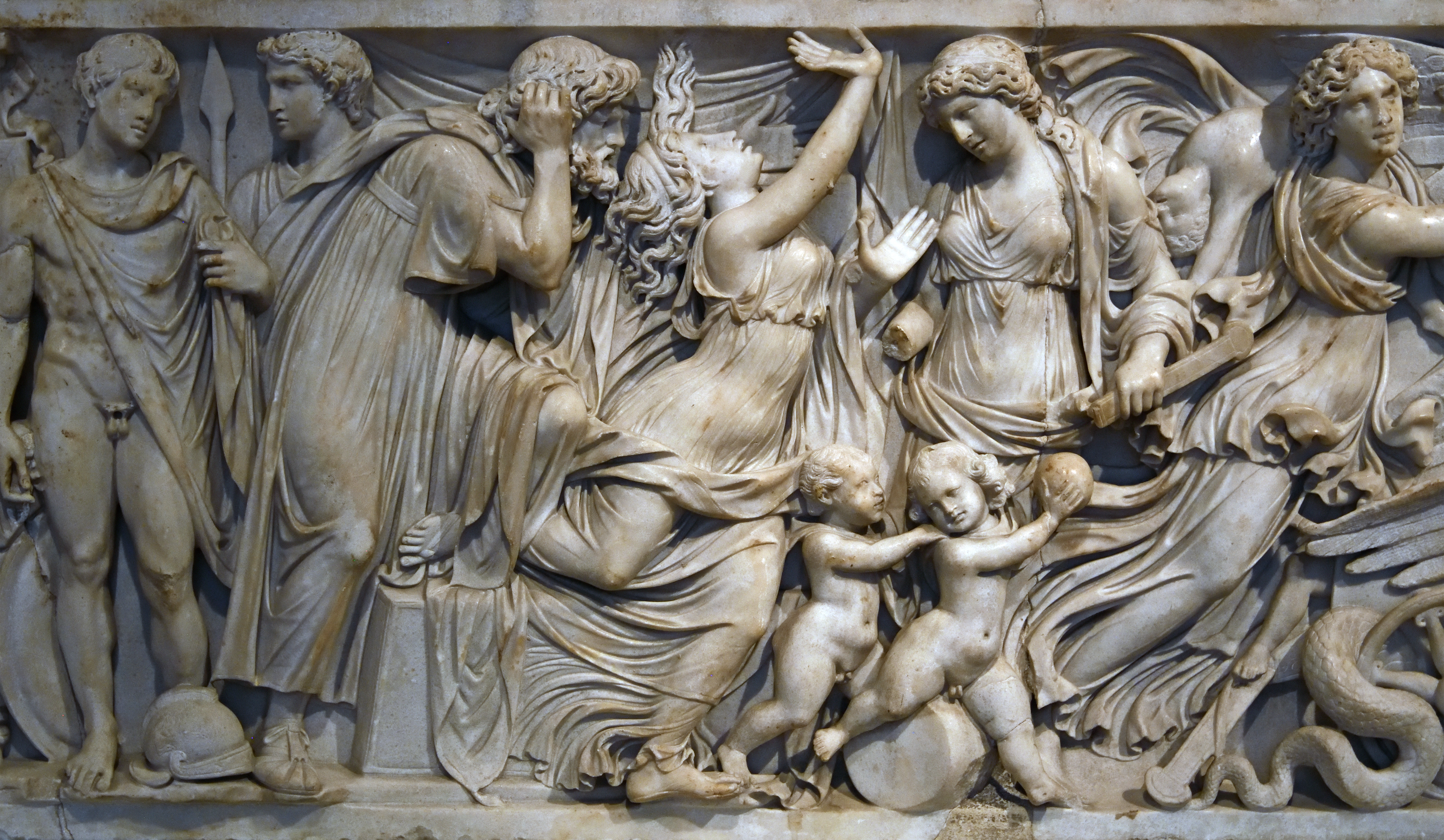
Creon witnesses the death of Glauce on a Roman 2nd-century sarcophagus, Berlin.

In Greek mythology, Creon (/ˈkriːɒn/; Ancient Greek: Κρέων, romanized: Kreōn, lit. 'ruler'), son of Lycaethus, was a king of Corinth and father of Hippotes and Creusa or Glauce, whom Jason would marry if not for the intervention of Medea.

== Mythology ==
According to a lost play by Euripides summarized in the Bibliotheca, Alcmaeon entrusted to Creon's care his two children by Manto—a son Amphilochus and a daughter Tisiphone. The latter grew up to be so pretty that Creon's wife sold her away as a slave, fearing that Creon might abandon her in favor of the maiden. Tisiphone was bought by her own father Alcmaeon, who failed to recognize her and did not get to know the truth until he came to Corinth to fetch his children.

Creon is best known in connection with the myth of Jason and Medea mentioned above. He showed hospitality towards the couple, and later expressed consent for Jason to marry his daughter. Ultimately, he fell victim to Medea's subsequent revenge, getting burned to death as he was attempting to rescue his daughter from a similar fate.
