= Boston Magazine (disambiguation) =

Boston Magazine may refer to:

- Boston Magazine (1783–1786)
- Boston Weekly Magazine (1802–1808)
- Boston Monthly Magazine (1825–1826)
- Boston (magazine) (1962–present)
