= Joseph Sanial-Dubay =

French writer

- Born: c. 1754; Cheylard, Ardèche, Kingdom of France
- Died: 2 July 1817; Paris, Kingdom of France
- Writing career
- Genre: Moralist

Joseph Sanial-Dubay (c. 1754 – 2 July 1817) was a French writer and moralist.

The historian Félix Bourquelot (1815–1868) mentions in his La littérature française contemporaine: XIX siècle, 1827-1849 (1857) that the introduction to the re-edition —and slightly expanded version, which brought the total number of pensées to 1322— of Sanial-Dubay's original 1813 Pensées sur l'homme,..., retitled in 1815 Pensées sur l'homme,... augmentées de celles qui n'avaient pu paraítre sous le règne de la tyranie ("augmented to include those which could not have appeared under the reign of tyranny") refers to the "frenzied tyrant, the enemy of mankind..." ("tyran forcené, l'ennemi du genre humain...") who had just been overthrown from the throne. The introduction adds that Sanial-Dubay, as "suspect of the last government for its political principles and for not wanting to burn a single grain of incense before the idol of the moment, experienced odious procedures on the part of the supporters of tyranny" and that he "patiently and silently endured all kinds of slander, anticipating that the frightening political meteor would soon and forever disappear from the horizon" ("suspect su dernier gouvernement pour ses principes politiques et pour n'avoir pas voulu brûler un seul grain d'encens devant l'idole du moment, éprouva d'odieux procedés de la part des suppót de la tyrannie"; qu'il "supporta patiemment et dans le silence toutes sortes d'avanies, prévoyant bien que l'effrayant méteore politique allait bientôt et pour toujours disparaítre de dessus l'horizon").

== Works ==
- 1808: Quelques Pensées sur les mœurs, Paris
- 1813: Pensées sur l'homme, le monde et les mœurs
- 1815: Pensées sur l'homme,... augmentées de celles qui n'avaient pu paraítre sous le règne de la tyranie
