= Herald of Freedom =

Herald of Freedom may refer to:

- Herald of Freedom (Boston newspaper) (1788–1791)
- The Herald of Freedom, a newspaper published by P. T. Barnum in Bethel, Connecticut (1831)
- Herald of Freedom (Lawrence newspaper), published in Wakarusa then Lawrence, Kansas, during the Bleeding Kansas period (1854–1860)
- Herald of Freedom (journal), the journal of the New Hampshire Anti-Slavery Society, published by John R. French
- "Herald of Freedom" (essay), an 1884 essay about the journal by Henry David Thoreau
- Herald of Freedom, a mid-20th century right-wing newsletter by Francis Alphonse Capell
