= Astraea =

Ancient Greek goddess of justice

- Goddess of justice, the constellation Virgo
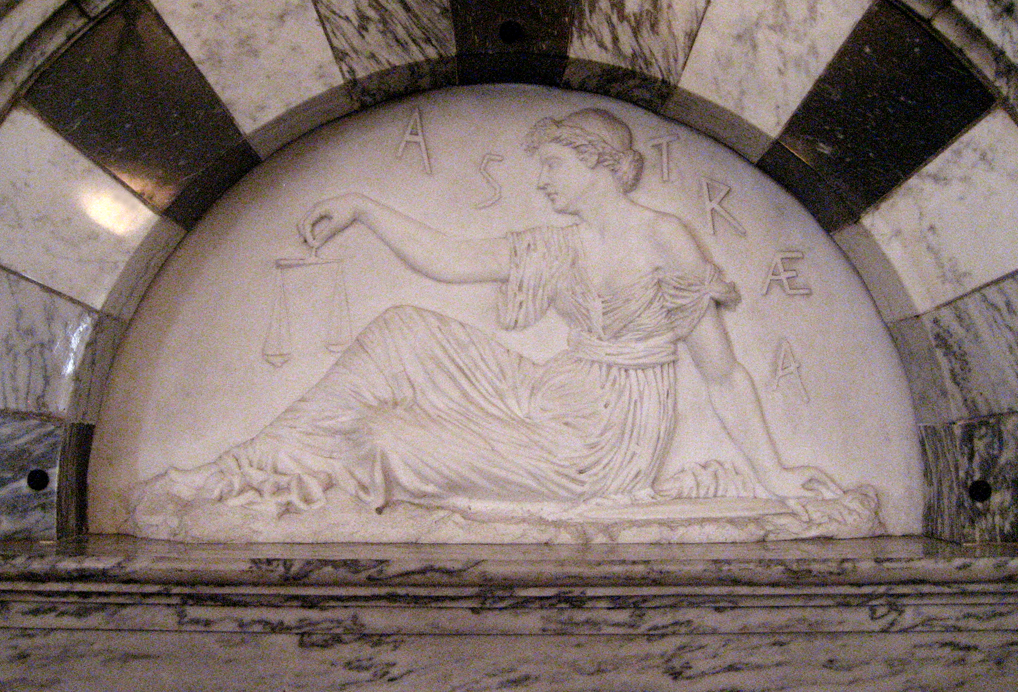
- An 1886 bas-relief figure of Astraea in the Old Supreme Court Chamber at the Vermont State House.
- Greek: Ἀστραία
- Abode: Earth (formerly); Sky (currently)
- Symbols: Corn, scales of justice

Genealogy
- Parents: Zeus or Astraeus (father); Themis or Eos (mother)
- Siblings: Anemoi, Horae, Planetae, Pudicitia

In ancient Greek religion and mythology, Astraea (/æˈstriːə/; Ancient Greek: Ἀστραία, romanized: Astraía, lit. 'starry, star-like'), also spelled Astrea or Astria, is a daughter of Astraeus and Eos. She is the virgin goddess of justice, and is closely associated with another Greek justice goddess, Dike, the daughter of Zeus and Themis. Astraea is not to be confused with Asteria, the goddess of the stars and the daughter of Coeus and Phoebe.

In Greek myth, Astraea lived together with humans on earth during the idealistic Golden Age, when people were virtuous and no evil existed in the world. But as the human race became progressively crueler and more corrupt, Astraea decided to abandon humanity forever and live among the stars as the constellation Virgo. The Virgo was associated with a number of Greek goddesses in antiquity.

The main belt asteroid 5 Astraea is named after her, and her name was also suggested for the planet Uranus.

== Etymology ==
The goddess's name "Astraea" (spelled in Ancient Greek Ἀστραία) is derived from the Greek word ἀστήρ (astḗr) meaning 'star'. The word ἀστήρ in turn is inherited from the Proto-Indo-European root *h₂ster- ('star'), from *h₂eh₁s-, meaning 'to burn'. Astraea's name thus shares an etymology with the name of Astraeus, who is her father in some versions, and cousin Asteria.

== Family and attributes ==
Astraea is a goddess who personifies justice. When identified with the justice-goddess Dike, Astraea is made the daughter of Zeus and Themis, or otherwise she is the daughter of Astraeus and Eos-Aurora, goddess of the dawn. Juvenal calls Astraea the sister of Pudicitia (the Roman goddess of chastity and the equivalent of Greek Aidos), and states that the two sisters withdrew from the mortal world together. When relating this tale, ancient authors tend to alternate between referring to her as Dike or as Astraea. As Dike, she is also called Iustitia, the name of the Roman goddess of justice and counterpart to Dike. Astraea was represented holding a pair of scales, symbol of justice and impartiality.

== Mythology ==
=== The Golden Age ===
Astraea, the celestial virgin who presided over justice, modesty and good faith, was traditionally said to be the last of the immortals to live together with humans during the Golden Age, the first of the old Greek religion's five Ages of Man until the coming of the harsh Iron Age, when the world fell into disarray and people only coveted gold, while family and friends would no longer trust each other.

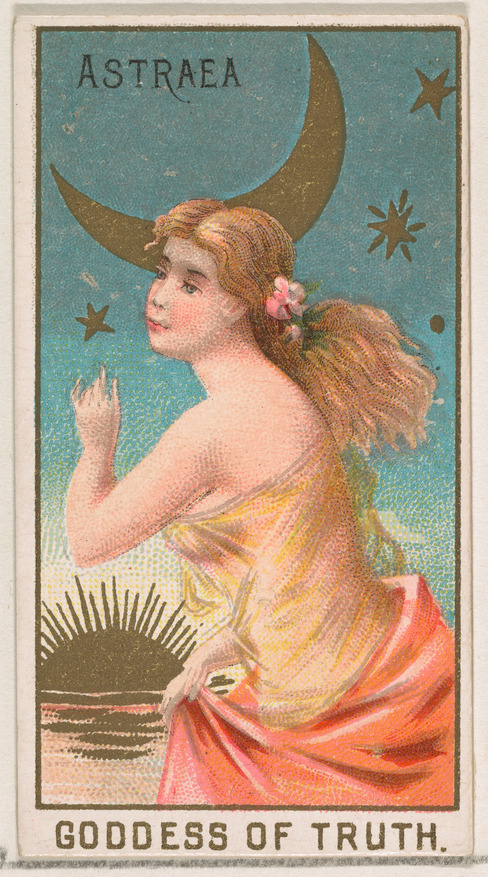
Astraea from the Goddesses of the Greeks and Romans series (N188) issued by Wm. S. Kimball & Co., Metropolitan Museum of Art.

The myth of Astraea has been variously attributed to eighth-century BC Greek poet Hesiod, who in his surviving works prophesied that since mankind had deteriorated so much in morality and virtue during his era (that is the Fifth Age, or Iron Age) the goddesses Nemesis and Aidos, who embodied divine retribution and humility respectively, would finally abandon the earth once and for all and return to Mount Olympus by the end of it, forsaking men and leaving them to deal with the hardships and evils on their own.

Later authors, starting first with Aratus writing over four hundred years after Hesiod, expanded on the tale. According to the later myths, at the beginning of time Justice (Dike in Greek) the daughter of Astraeus used to live and mingle with men and women on earth, an immortal among mortals. During this Golden Age there was no strife, war and battle or detestation between people as Justice urged them all to be kind to each other and spread feelings of virtue and honour among them. In this pre-seafaring era, humans only ploughed their rich fields while Justice supplied them with all they could ever want or need.

As the Golden Age ended and the Silver one arrived, the goddess found herself dissatisfied as people were less virtuous than before and started yearning for the older times. She no longer spoke with gentle words to them and took to the hills and then the mountains. She used threats and shame on them, but failed to motivate them to become better people. Then the Bronze and Iron Ages rolled in which introduced war and hatred, corruption, people consuming the oxen they previously only used to plough the fields and the vanishment of honour and love. They began to sail the seas after cutting down trees to build ships, divided the free land between them and dug up the earth in search for wealth such as iron and gold. Finally the disillusioned Dike-Astraea decided to abandon humanity for good and take her place among the stars as the constellation Virgo, also known as the Maiden, with the star Spica as the ear of corn she holds.

To a lesser extent, Astraea was also envisioned as the goddess who watched over mortals and then reported their wrongdoings back to Zeus. Valerius Flaccus wrote that the harsh weather and storms of November were associated with Zeus' vengeance against mankind on behalf of Astraea. According to Nonnus, Astraea as the starry nurse of the universe once took under her care and nurished Beroe, the daughter of Aphrodite. She nursed the infant on her breast and fashioned a necklace out of Spica for her.

=== Virgil ===
The first-century BC Roman poet Virgil wrote in around 40 BC that Astraea was about to come back to Earth permanently, bringing with her the return of the utopian Golden Age of which she was the ambassador, and the reign of Saturnus, a Roman fertility god associated with the Greek Cronus, but who nevertheless had an independent origin and worship in the Italic peninsula, lauded as the fallen god-king who introduced agriculture and helped humans develop civilization. The promise of Astraea's hoped-for return is found in the fourth book of his Eclogues:

Iam redit et virgo, redeunt Saturnia Regna.

— Virgil, Eclogues 4.5–12
Translation:

[J]ustice returns, returns old Saturn's reign.

— Translation by J. B. Greenough.

Virgil used the pre-existing myth of Astraea within a political frame in order to hail the dawning Augustan rule, signaling the return of harmony and lack of war, conflict and suffering that had marked the turbulent period between 44 and 38 BC; he added that Astraea's return was to be accompanied by the arrival of a child who would also kick off Augustus' new golden age along with her. The exact identity of the unknown child that escorted Astraea is the subject of much debate; it has been speculated that Virgil meant the son of Gaius Asinius Pollio, the consul to whom the poem was dedicated; or the hypothetical child that the marriage between Mark Antony and Augustus' sister Octavia the Younger would produce; or even Alexander Helios, the son of Cleopatra and Mark Antony.

== Development from Dike ==
Astraea was conflated and often treated as interchangeable with Dike, one of the Horae (daughters of Zeus and Themis) and goddess of justice, who was also given the same story of living with mortals during the early years of humanity before abandoning them to become the Virgo after their wickedness and lawlessness became too unbearable for her. Dike's fiercer form was Nemesis, the goddess who is set to depart from the earth in Hesiod's prophecy. Dike is one of the several goddesses identified with the Virgo constellation.

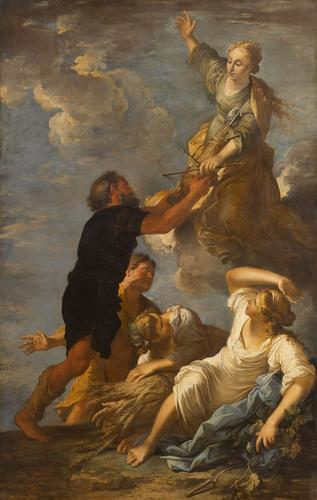
Astrea, the virgin goddess of Innocence and purity, by Salvator Rosa.

Judging from the preserved Greek and Roman corpus and art, there is no indication that this goddess was ever properly called Astraea before Ovid in the early first century AD, with writers preceding him preferring Dike ("justice") or simply the Maiden to refer to her. It seems that the notion of using Astraea as Dike's name proper was prompted from Aratus writing that Astraeus was the star-maiden's father.

== Legacy of Astraea ==
During the European Renaissance, Astraea became associated with the general spirit of renewal of culture occurring at that time, particularly in England, where she became poetically identified in literature with the figure of Queen Elizabeth I as the virgin Queen reigning over a new Golden Age. In Spain, she was often identified with the rule of Philip IV. The French author Honoré d'Urfé wrote a very popular serial novel called L'Astrée, whose titular heroine is named after Astraea, which was published serially between 1607 and 1627 with each installment very much anticipated by the aristocratic public at the time; Jean-Jacques Rousseau in his Confessions (p. 160 Penguin Classics) notes it as one of the novels read with his father and says it "was the one that recurred most frequently to my mind". A spectacle play by the Count of Villamediana and thirteen dramas by Pedro Calderón de la Barca introduce a character named Astraea to highlight the political and astrological concerns. In the Russian Empire, Astraea was identified first with Empress Elizabeth of Russia, then with Empress Catherine the Great of Russia.

The English epic poet Edmund Spenser further embellished this myth at the opening of Book V of The Faerie Queene (1596), where he claims that Astraea left behind "her groome | An yron man" called Talus. William Shakespeare refers to Astraea in Titus Andronicus, and also in Henry VI, Part 1. In his most famous play, Life Is a Dream, Calderón has a character named Rosaura (an anagram for "dawns") take on the name of Astraea at Court. This may be a laudatory political allusion to the dawn of a new Golden Age under Philip IV/Segismundo.

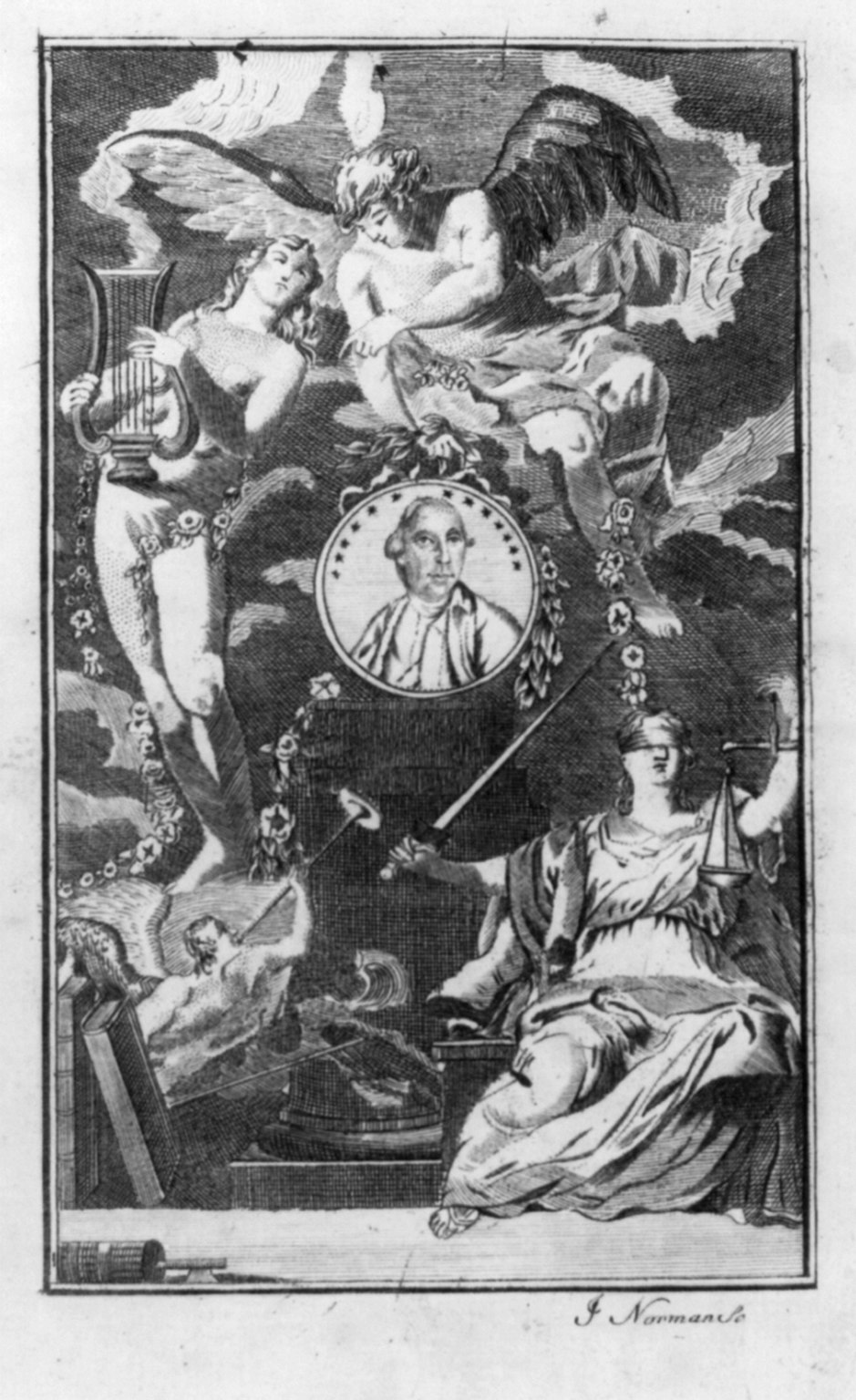
1784 engraving by John Norman.

Astraea is also referenced in John Milton's epic poem Paradise Lost, in Book IV between lines 990 and 1000. When Satan is discovered in the Garden of Eden and brought before the Angel Gabriel, the two are on the verge of war.

"[God (The Eternal)] Hung forth in Heav'n his golden Scales, yet seen
Betwixt Astrea and the Scorpion signe,
Wherein all things created first he weighd,
The pendulous round Earth with ballanc't Aire
In counterpoise, now ponders all events,
Battels and Realms:"

The British writer Aphra Behn used "Astrea" as one of her code-names while working as a spy for King Charles II. She subsequently used the name "Astrea" to identify the speaker in many of her poems, and was herself referred to as "The Incomparable Astrea".

Astraea was represented on a allegorical engraving by John Norman published in 1784, just a few years after the American declaration of independence, in which she appears to decide on where on earth she will make her residence while Nature is about to play the lyre, Fame blows her trumpet and Liberty presents a medal to George Washington.

"Astræa" is also the title of a poem by Ralph Waldo Emerson.

The planned British replacement A21/Mk7 nuclear warhead will be named Astraea.

== Genealogy ==
Astraea's family tree

Uranus	Gaia	Pontus
Oceanus	Tethys	Hyperion	Theia	Crius	Eurybia
The Rivers	The Oceanids	Helios	Selene	Eos	Astraeus	Pallas	Perses
The Anemoi	ASTRAEA	The Stars
Cronus	Rhea	Coeus	Phoebe
Hestia	Hera	Hades	Zeus	Leto	Asteria
Demeter	Poseidon
Iapetus	Clymene (or Asia)	Mnemosyne	(Zeus)	Themis
Atlas	Menoetius	Prometheus	Epimetheus	The Muses	ASTRAEA; Horae

== See also ==
- Adikia
- Astrotheology
- Pandora's box
- Elpis

== Bibliography ==
=== Primary sources ===
- Aratus of Soli, Phaenomena in Callimachus, Lycophron, Aratus. Hymns and Epigrams. Lycophron: Alexandra. Aratus: Phaenomena, with an English translation by A. W. Mair, G. R. Mair. Loeb Classical Library 129. Cambridge, MA: Harvard University Press, 1921. Online text at Topos Text.
- Eratosthenes, Catasterismi, with a Latin translation, Vandenhoeck et Ruprecht: 1795. Bavarian State Library. Text available at the Internet Archive.
- Hesiod, Theogony, in The Homeric Hymns and Homerica with an English Translation by Hugh G. Evelyn-White, Cambridge, MA., Harvard University Press; London, William Heinemann Ltd. 1914. Online version at the Perseus Digital Library.
- Hesiod, Works and Days in The Homeric Hymns and Homerica with an English translation by Hugh G. Evelyn-White. Works and Days. Cambridge, MA., Harvard University Press; London, William Heinemann Ltd. 1914. Online version available online on the Perseus Digital Library.
- Hyginus, Astronomica from The Myths of Hyginus translated and edited by Mary Grant. University of Kansas Publications in Humanistic Studies. Online version at the Topos Text Project.
- Juvenal, Satires with an English translation by G. G. Ramsay. London, London Heinemann. 1920. Online version available at Internet Archive.
- Nonnus, Dionysiaca; translated by Rouse, W H D, III Books XXXVI-XLVIII. Loeb Classical Library No. 346, Cambridge, Massachusetts, Harvard University Press; London, William Heinemann Ltd. 1940. Internet Archive.
- Ovid (2005). The Metamorphoses. Translated by Frank Justus Miller. New York: Barnes & Noble Classics. ISBN 978-1-59308-276-5.
- Valerius Flaccus, Argonautica translated into English by J. H. Mozley. Loeb Classical Library 286. Cambridge, MA: Harvard University Press, 1934.
- Virgil, Eclogues, with an English translation by J. B. Greenough. Boston. Ginn & Co. 1895. Online text available at the Perseus Digital Library.

=== Secondary sources ===
- Avery, Catherine B., ed. (1962). New Century Classical Handbook. New York, US: Appleton-Century-Crofts.
- Beekes, Robert S. P. (2009). Lucien van Beek (ed.). Etymological Dictionary of Greek. Leiden Indo-European Etymological Dictionary Series. Vol. 1. Leiden, the Netherlands: Brill Publications. ISBN 978-90-04-17420-7. ISSN 1574-3586.
- Bell, Robert E. (1991). Women of Classical Mythology: A Biographical Dictionary. ABC-Clio. ISBN 9780874365818.
- Bulfinch, Thomas (1970). Fuller, Edmund (ed.). Bulfinch's Mythology: Age of Fable, a modern abridgment by Edmund Fuller. New York, USA: Dell Publishing.
- Caldwell, Richard S. (June 1, 1987). Hesiod's Theogony. Cambridge, MA: Focus Publishing/R. Pullins Company. ISBN 978-0-941051-00-2.
- De Armas, Frederick Alfred (1986). The Return of Astraea: An Astral-Imperial Myth in Calderón. US: Kentucky University Press. ISBN 978-0-8131-5213-4.
- Grimal, Pierre (1987). The Dictionary of Classical Mythology. Wiley-Blackwell. ISBN 0-631-13209-0.
- Hansen, William F. (2004). Handbook of classical mythology. Santa Barbara, CA: ABC-CLIO. ISBN 9781576072264.
- Hard, Robin (2004). The Routledge Handbook of Greek Mythology: Based on H.J. Rose's "Handbook of Greek Mythology". Routledge. ISBN 9780415186360.
- Holzman, Robert S. (March 7, 2022). Anesthesia and the Classics: Essays on avatars of professional values. CRC Press. ISBN 9781032049014.
- Kerenyi, Karl (1951). The Gods of the Greeks. Translated by Norman Cameron. London, New York: Thames & Hudson.
- Liddell, Henry George; Scott, Robert (1940). A Greek-English Lexicon, revised and augmented throughout by Sir Henry Stuart Jones with the assistance of Roderick McKenzie. Oxford: Clarendon Press. Online version at Perseus.tufts project.
- March, Jennifer R. (May 31, 2014). Dictionary of Classical Mythology. Oxbow Books. ISBN 978-1-78297-635-6.
- Murray, Alexander Stuart; Klapp, William H. (2005). Handbook of World Mythology. Mineola, New York: Dover Publications, Inc. ISBN 0-486-44374-4.
- Rose, Herbert J. (2004). A Handbook of Greek Mythology (6th ed.). London, New York: Routledge. ISBN 0-415-04601-7.
- Seyffert, Oskar (1901). Nettleship, Henry; Sandys, J. E. (eds.). A Dictionary of Classical Antiquities, Mythology, Religion, Literature and Art. S. Sonnenschein.
- Smith, William (1873). A Dictionary of Greek and Roman Biography and Mythology. London, UK: John Murray, printed by Spottiswoode and Co. Online version at the Perseus.tufts library.
- Tripp, Edward (June 1970). Crowell's Handbook of Classical Mythology (1st ed.). Thomas Y. Crowell Co. ISBN 069022608X.
- Versnel, Henk S. (December 1, 1992). Inconsistencies in Greek and Roman Religion. Studies in Greek and Roman Religion. Vol. 2: Transition and Reversal in Myth and Ritual. Leiden, the Netherlands: BRILL. ISBN 978-90-04-09267-9.
- Yates, Frances Amelia (1975). Astraea. Vol. V. London and New York: Routledge. ISBN 0-415-22048-3.
- Zissos, Andrew (2008). Valerius Flaccus' Argonautica, Book 1: Edited with Introduction, Translation, and Commentary. Oxford University Press. ISBN 978-0-19-921949-0.
