= Moralism =

Philosophy with the focus on morality

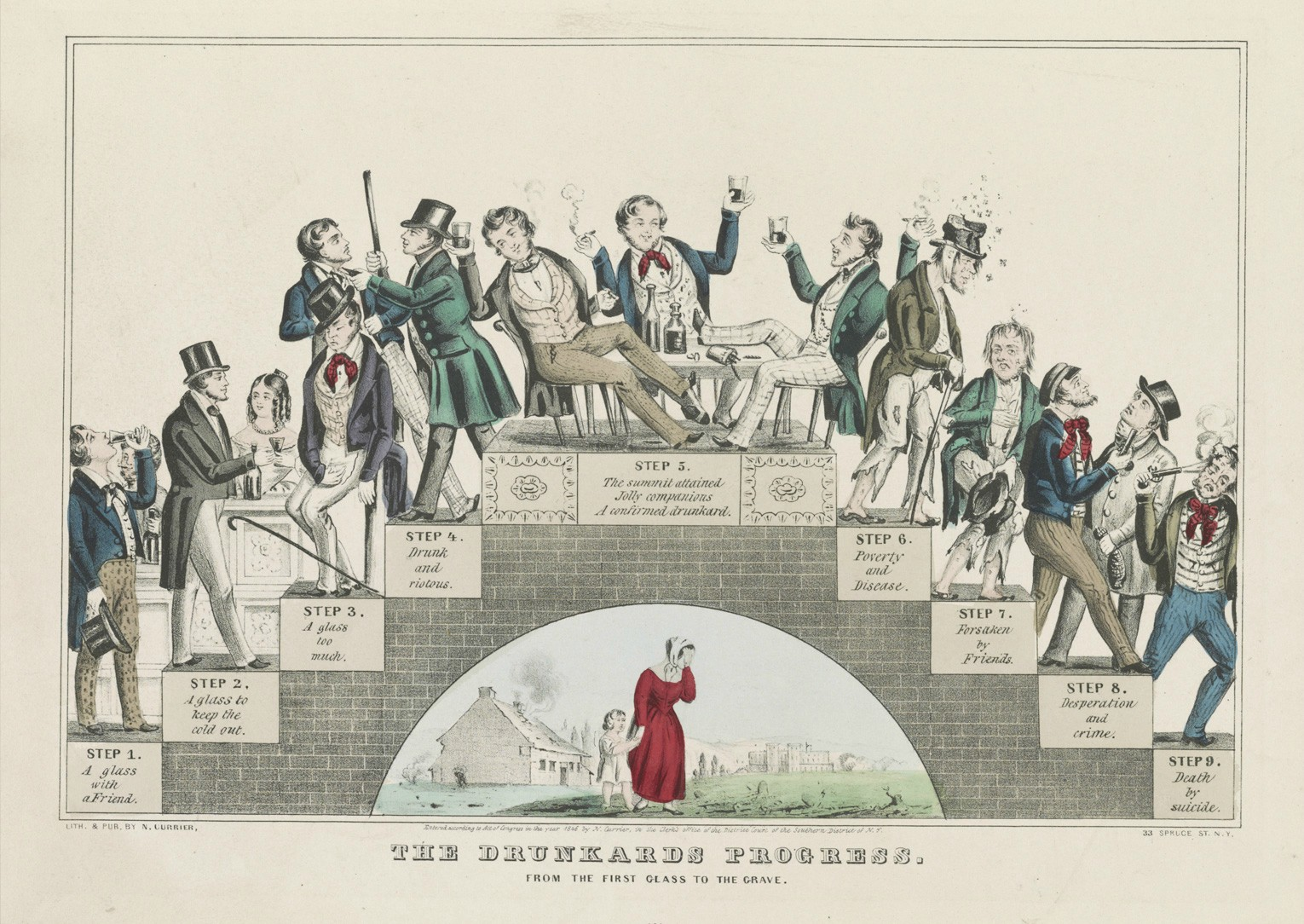
The Drunkard's Progress: by Nathaniel Currier 1846, warns that moderate drinking leads, step-by-step, to total disaster.

Moralism is a philosophy that arose in the 19th century that concerns itself with imbuing society with a certain set of morals, usually traditional behaviour, but also "justice, freedom, and equality". It has strongly affected North American and British culture, concerning private issues such as the family unit and sexuality, as well as issues that carry over into the public square, such as the temperance movement.

The term has been used in a pejorative sense to describe the attitude of "being overly concerned with making moral judgments or being illiberal in the judgments one makes".

== French moralists ==
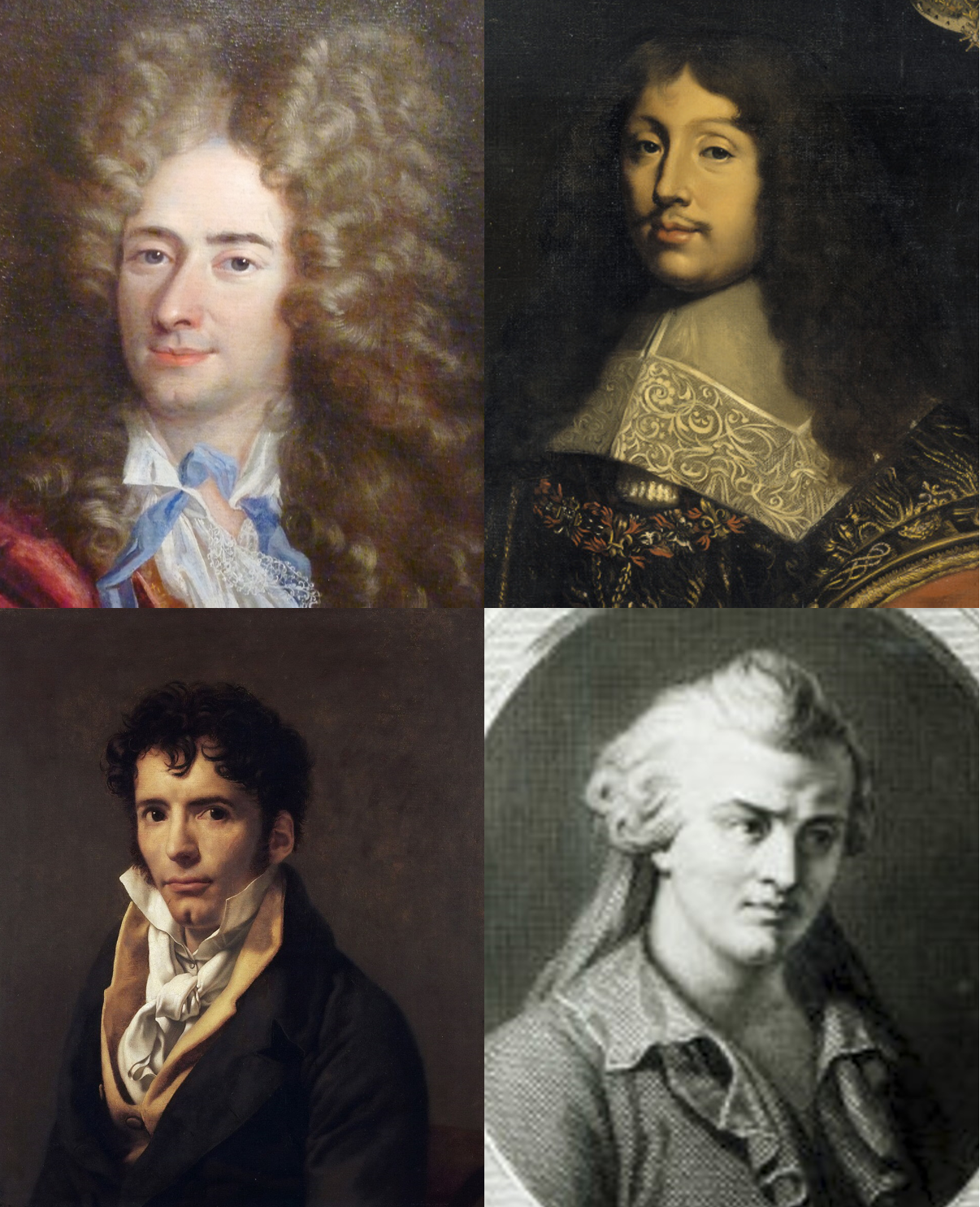
From top left and clockwise: Jean de La Bruyère, François de La Rochefoucauld, Luc de Clapiers, Nicolas Chamfort

In French literature, the moralists (French: moralistes) were a tradition of secular writers who described "personal, social and political conduct", typically through maxims. The tradition is associated with the salons of the Ancien Régime from the 16th through the 18th centuries. The tradition begins with the Essais of Michel de Montaigne (1580), but its heyday was the late 17th century.

Although the moralists wrote essays and pen-portraits, their preferred genre was the maxim. These were short abstract statements devoid of context, often containing paradoxes and always designed to shock or surprise. The moralists aimed for objective and impartial observation freed from the preconceptions of their day. Their approach was never systematic. The four principal moralists and their main works are:

- François de La Rochefoucauld, Réflexions ou sentences et maximes morales (1665)
- Jean de La Bruyère, Caractères ou les moeurs de ce siècle (1688)
- Luc de Clapiers, marquis de Vauvenargues, Introduction à la connaissance de l’esprit humain, suivie de réflexions et maximes (1746)
- Nicolas Chamfort, Maximes et pensées, caractères et anecdotes (1795)

== North America ==
In tracing the origins of moralism, sociologist Malcolm Waters writes that "Moralism emerged from a clash between the unrestrained character of frontier expansionism, a middle-class, Protestant emphasis on respectability cultivated in small-town America and an egalitarian and anti-intellectual evangelism among splinter Protestant groups."

In the 19th century, the issues of abolition and temperance formed the "twin pillars" of moralism, becoming popular through Christian churches in the United States, both Protestant and Roman Catholic. Moralism as promoted by some Christian denominations, such as the Free Methodist Church and Quakers, manifested in wide support for abolitionism.

The rise of postmillennialism in the 19th century "encouraged a general culture of Protestant moralism and pushed it toward a series of social reform movements, from antislavery and abolitionism (freedom for the slaves now), to protests against Indian Removal, to antiwar and peace efforts, to women's rights, to temperance work before and after the Civil War." As such, the campaign for women's suffrage, evidenced by the ethos of organisations such as the Women's Christian Temperance Union (WCTU), was highly driven by the moralism of that era.

In the latter part of the 20th century, as well as the 21st century, moralists in the United States turned their attention to championing the movement to criminalize abortion care. Moralists have also focused their efforts on maintaining blue laws, such as those that discourage Sunday shopping, in accordance with first-day Sabbatarian beliefs and the sensibilities of some labourers and trade unions.

== See also ==
- Christian left
- Christian mission
- Christian right
- Conservative holiness movement
- List of Temperance organizations
- Methodism
- Nonconformist conscience
- Pietism
- Prohibition in the United States
- Secondary poverty
- Social Gospel
- Victorian morality
- Woman's Christian Temperance Union
