= Edmund Freeman (printer) =

American printer and publisher

Edmund Freeman (1764–1807) was a printer and publisher in Boston, Massachusetts, in the late 18th century. He published the Boston Magazine and the Herald of Freedom newspaper. He worked with Loring Andrews as "Freeman and Andrews, printers, State-Street, north side State-House." As editor of the Herald of Freedom, he was sued for libel in 1790 by Massachusetts legislator John Gardiner; Freeman won the case.

Freeman came to Boston from Sandwich, Massachusetts. He was a son of Brigadier General Nathaniel Freeman and Tryphosa Colton. He married Elizabeth Pattee (died 1866); children were William Freeman (1797–1829) and Ann Freeman (1798–1857). He died in 1807, at age 43.
