= Ages of Man =

Stages of human existence according to Greco-Roman mythology

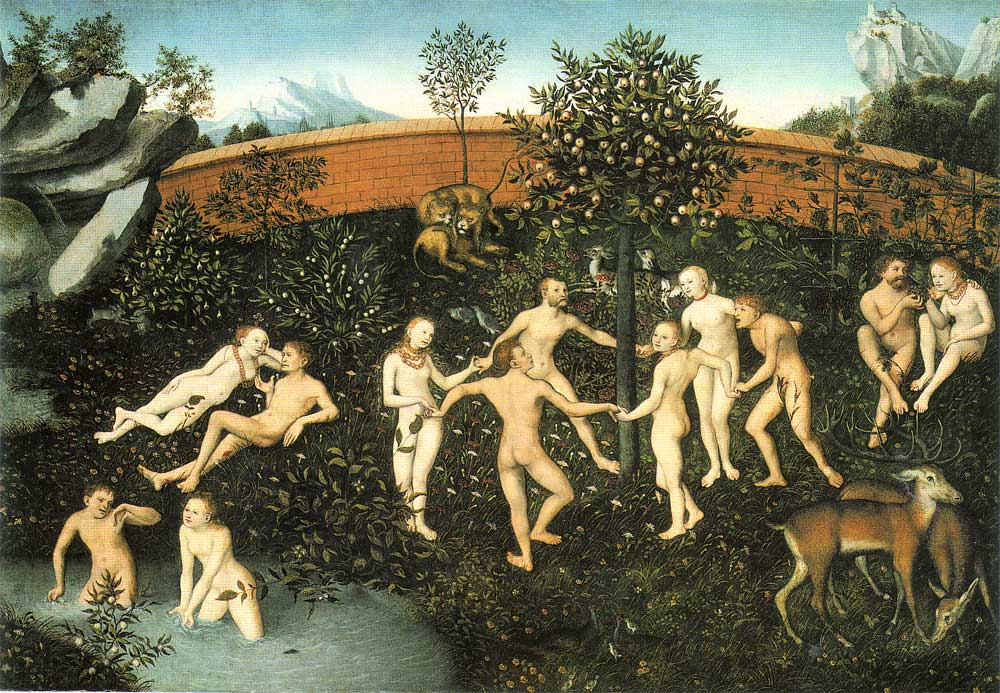
Lucas Cranach the Elder, The Golden Age

The Ages of Man are the historical stages of human existence according to Greek mythology and its subsequent Roman interpretation.

Both Hesiod and Ovid offered accounts of the successive ages of humanity, which tend to progress from an original, long-gone age in which humans enjoyed a nearly divine existence to the current age of the writer, in which humans are beset by innumerable pains and evils. In the two accounts that survive from Ancient Greece and Rome, this degradation of the human condition over time is indicated symbolically with metals of successively decreasing value, yet increasing hardness.

== Hesiod's Five Ages ==
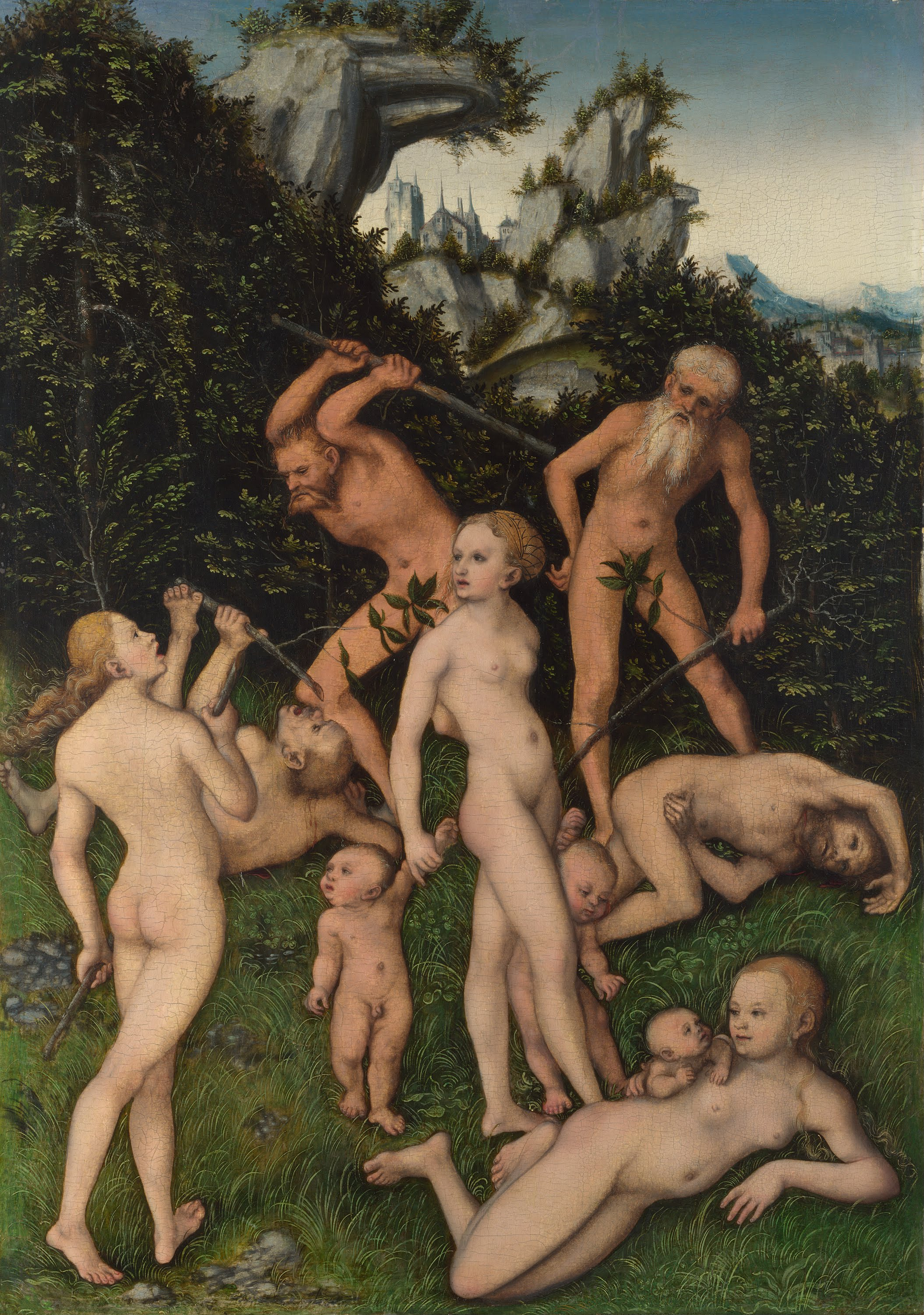
Lucas Cranach the Elder, The Silver Age

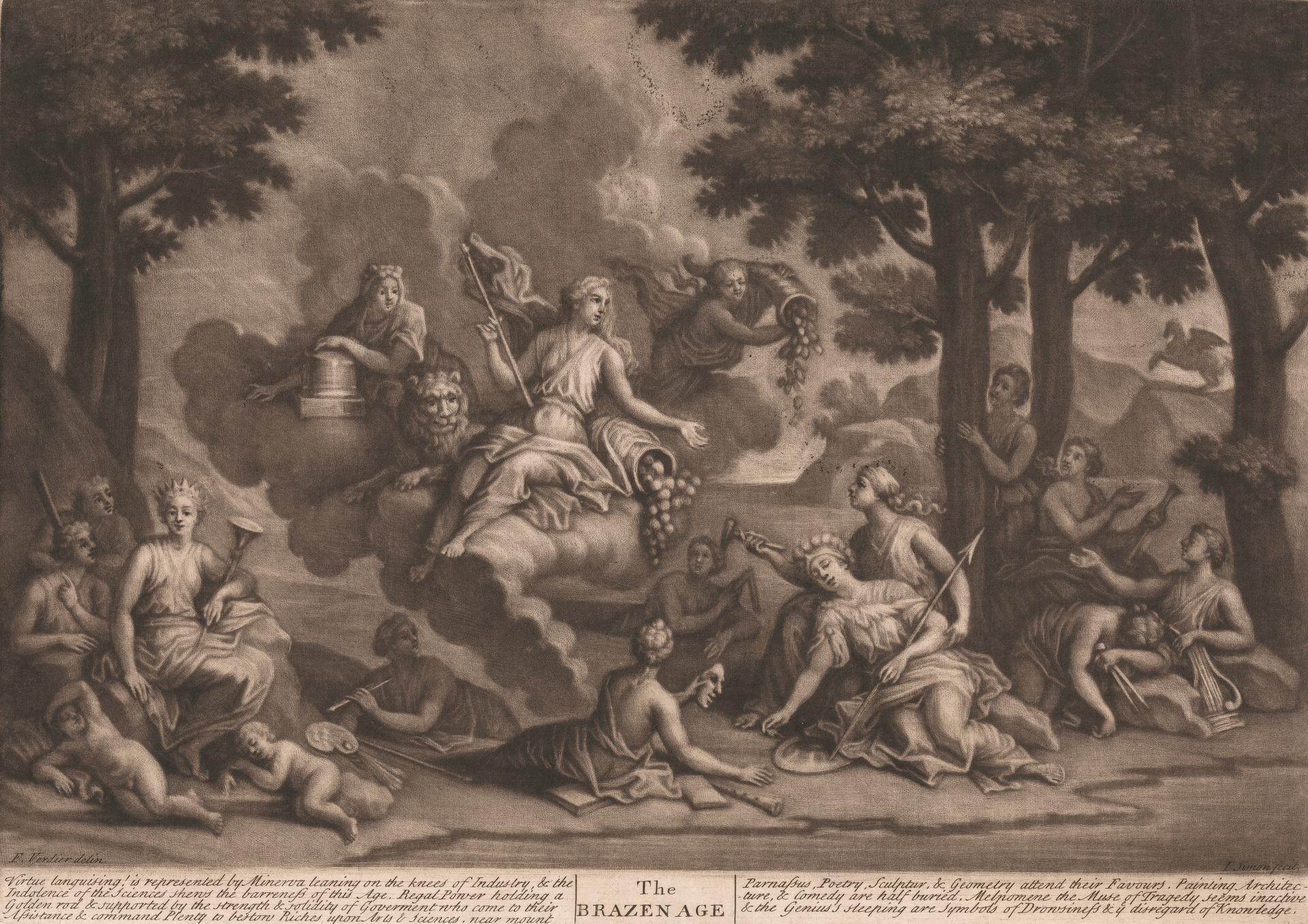
John Simon, The Brazen Age

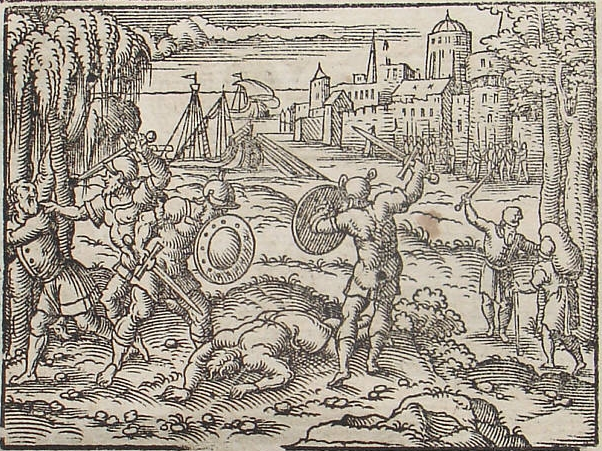
Virgil Solis, The Iron Age

The Greek poet Hesiod (between 750 and 650 BC) outlined his Five Ages in his poem Works and Days (lines 109–201). His list is:

- Golden Age (Χρύσεον Γένος, Chryseon Genos) – The Golden Age is the age that falls within the rule of Cronus. Created by the immortals who live on Olympus. Peace and harmony prevailed during this age. Humans did not have to work to feed themselves, for the earth provided food in abundance. They lived to very old age but with a youthful appearance and eventually died peacefully.
- Silver Age (Αργύρεον Γένος, Argyreon Genos) – The Silver Age and every age that follows fall within the rule of Cronus's successor and son, Zeus. Men in the Silver Age lived for one hundred years under the dominion of their mothers. They lived only a short time as grown adults, and spent that time in strife with one another. During this Age, men refused to worship the gods and Zeus destroyed them for their impiety. After death, humans of this age became "blessed spirits" of the underworld.
- Bronze Age – This age is also sometimes known as the Copper Age or Brazen Age (Χάλκειον Γένος, Chalkeion Genos). Men of the Bronze Age were hardened and tough, and the deed of Ares (war) and violence were their passion. Zeus created these humans out of the ash tree. Their armor was forged of bronze, as were their homes and tools. The men of this Age were undone by their own violent ways and left no named spirits; instead, they dwell in the "house of Hades".
- Heroic Age (Ἡρώων Γένος, Hērōōn Genos) – The Heroic Age is the one age that does not correspond with any metal. It is also the only age that improves upon the age it follows. The heroes and demigods of this Age fought at Thebes in the times of Cadmus and Oedipus, and during the Trojan War. They were taken to a land beyond the seas, ruled by Cronus, with sweet fruits flourishing thrice a year, far from the deathless gods.
- Iron Age (Σιδήρεον Γένος, Sidēreon Genos) – During this age, humans live an existence of toil and misery. Children dishonor their parents, brother fights with brother, and the social contract between guest and host is forgotten. During this age, might makes right, and bad men use lies to be thought good. At the height of this age, humans no longer feel shame or indignation at wrongdoing. Zeus will end this age when babies will be born with gray hair, and the gods will have completely forsaken humanity: "there will be no help against evil."

Hesiod finds himself in the Iron Age.

== Ovid's Four Ages ==
The Roman poet Ovid (1st century BC – 1st century AD) tells a similar myth of Four Ages in Book 1.89–150 of the Metamorphoses. His account is similar to Hesiod's, with the exception that he omits the Heroic Age.

- Ovid emphasizes that innocence and justice defined the Golden Age. Men did not suffer. He adds that in this age, men did not yet know the art of navigation and therefore did not explore the larger world. Further, no man had knowledge of agriculture, but collected food that fell from the trees.
- In the Silver Age, after Saturn was driven into Tartarus, Jupiter introduced the seasons, and men consequently learn the art of agriculture and inhabited houses.
- In the Bronze Age or the Age of Brass, Ovid writes, men were prone to warfare, but not impiety.
- Finally, in the Iron Age, men demarcate nations with boundaries; they learn the arts of navigation and mining; they are warlike, greedy, and impious. Truth, modesty, and loyalty are nowhere to be found.In this period Astraea, goddess of justice leaves Earth bathed in slaughter.

Ovid considers the Iron Age to be in the past, so he does not equate his time with the Iron Age.

== Commentary by other authors ==
Plato in Cratylus recounts the golden race of men who came first. In the dialog, Socrates clarifies to Hermogenes that Hesiod did not mean men literally made of gold, but good and noble. Socrates describes these men as spirits or daemons upon the Earth. Since δαίμονες (daimones) is derived from δαήμονες (daēmones, meaning knowing or wise), they are beneficent, preventing ills, and guardians of mortals.

The Ehoiai suggests that Zeus planned the Trojan War as a means to destroy the demigods and thus end the Heroic Age.

According to Bibliotheca, attributed to Apollodorus (circa 2nd century BCE), the Bronze Age came to an end with the flood of Deucalion. In constrast, in Eligies (circa 1st century BCE), Propertius equates the same flood with the end of the Golden Age.

These mythological ages are sometimes associated with historical timelines. In the chronology of Saint Jerome, the Golden Age lasts c. 1710 to 1674 BC, the Silver Age 1674 to 1628 BC, the Bronze Age 1628 to 1472 BC, the Heroic Age 1460 to 1103 BC, while Hesiod's Iron Age was considered as still ongoing by Saint Jerome in the fourth century AD.

== Related usage ==
Modern historical periodisation such as the three-age system has reappropriated the terms Bronze Age and Iron Age to describe archaeological periods following the Stone Age based on predominant metallurgical practices. Congruently, the term Golden Age is used to describe a civilization during a historical highpoint, for example the Golden Age of India, Islamic Golden Age and the Han and Tang dynasties of China.

== See also ==
Similar concepts include:

- Christian: Six Ages of the World, dispensationalism
- Hindu: Yuga Cycle (Satya, Treta, Dvapara and Kali Yuga)
- Buddhist: Three Ages
- Jain: Utsarpiṇī and Avasarpiṇī
- Aztec: Five Suns
- Maya: Mesoamerican creation myths (generations of man)
- Giambattista Vico's ricorso: the return of the society to a relatively more primitive condition
- J. R. R. Tolkien's fictional "Four Ages"
- Oswald Spengler's civilizational model
- Modern archaeology: Three-age system (Stone, Bronze and Iron), with each of the stages further divided into substages (e.g. the Stone Age comprises the Paleolithic, Mesolithic and Neolithic).
- Lebenstreppe: an artistic tradition that depicts the ages as a series of ascending and descending steps
- Marx & Engels: modes of production
