= Edward Wilson Currier =

American painter (1857–1918)

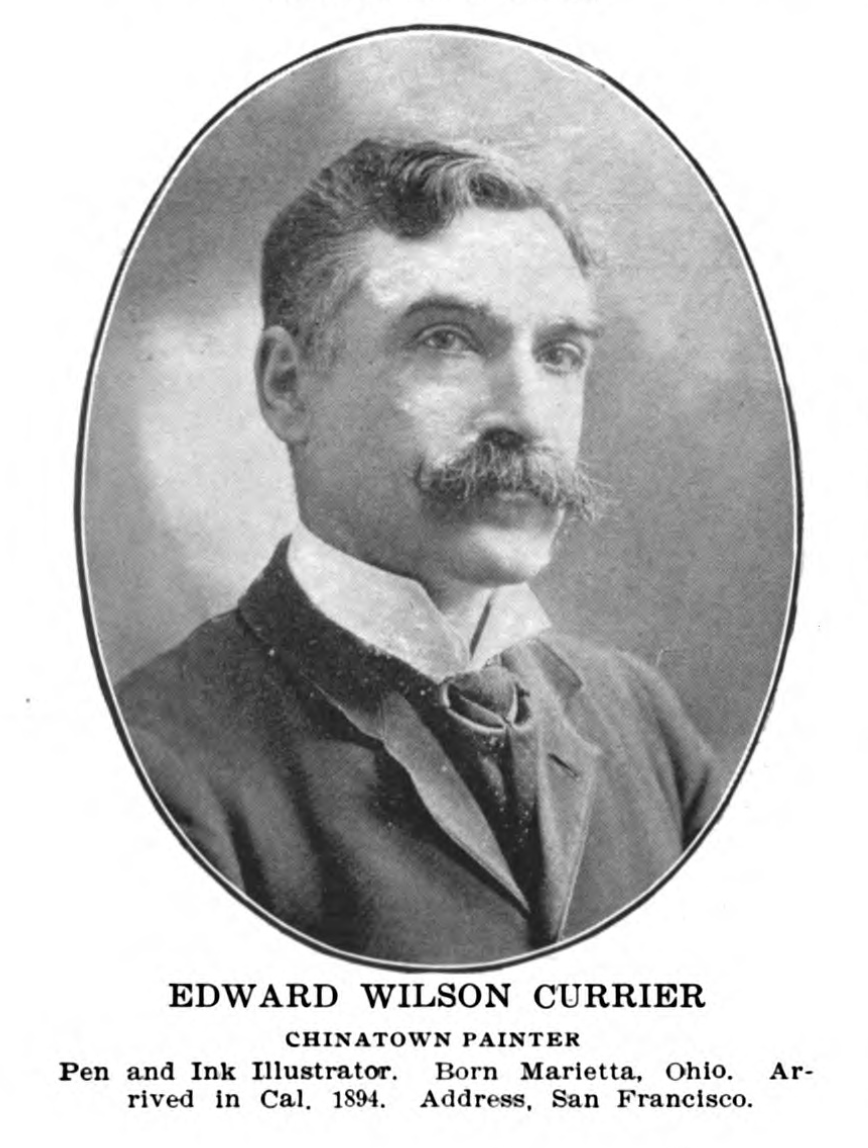
- Born: October 11, 1857; Marietta, Ohio, U.S.
- Died: November 15, 1918 (aged 61)
- Education: Chicago Academy of Fine Arts
- Occupation: Painter
- Parent: Charles Jacob Currier
- Relatives: Nathaniel Currier (paternal uncle)

Edward Wilson Currier (1857–1918) was an American painter and illustrator. Born in Marietta, Ohio, he was educated at the Chicago Academy of Fine Arts and opened a studio in San Francisco, California. He did oil and watercolor paintings of landscapes, still lifes and maritime scenes. He took trips to Hetch Hetchy and the Yosemite Valley to make sketches for his paintings.
