= The Drunkard's Progress =

1846 Nathaniel Currier illustration

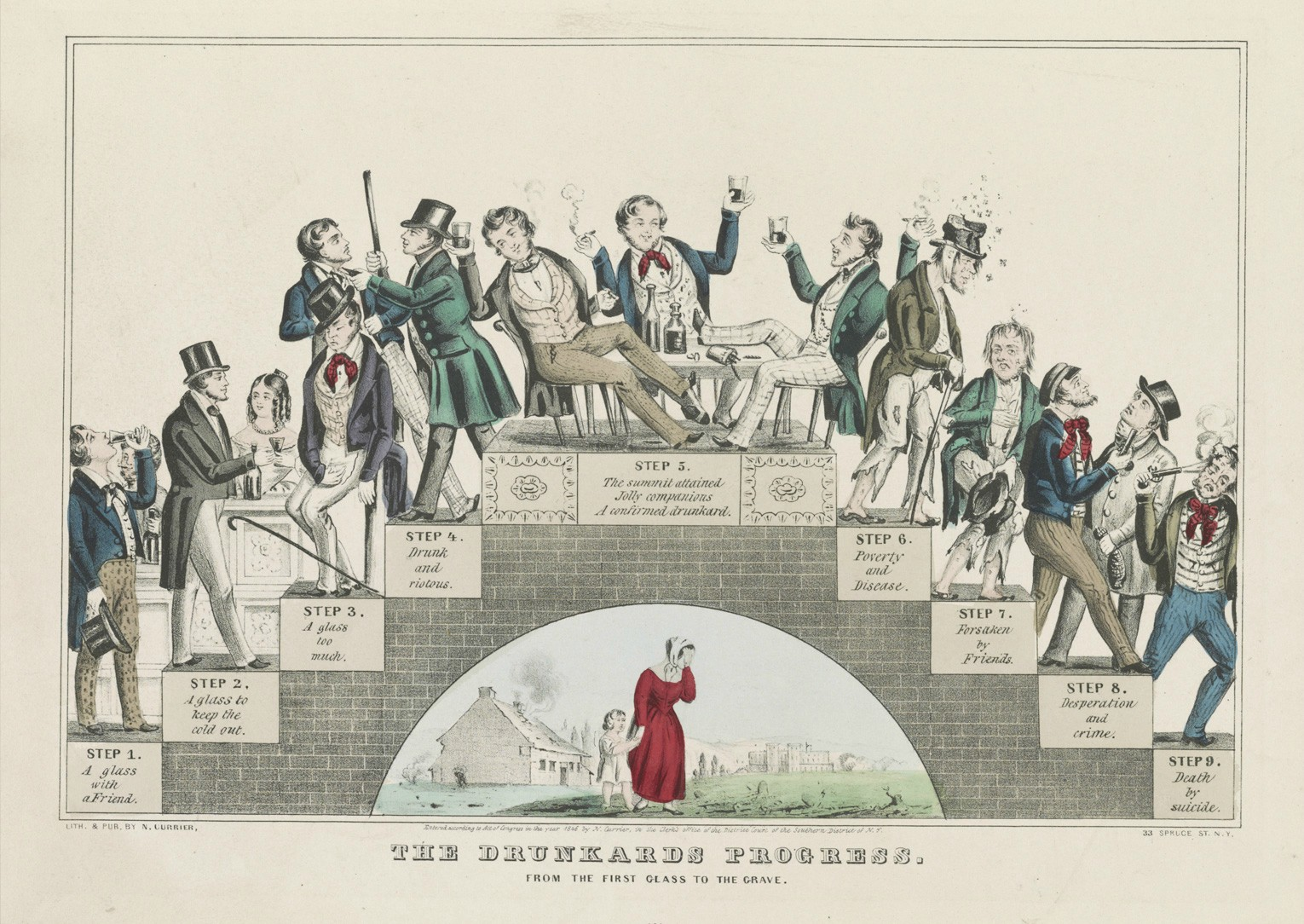
The Drunkard's Progress: From the First Glass to the Grave. Nathaniel Currier 1846.

The Drunkard's Progress: From the First Glass to the Grave is an 1846 lithograph by Nathaniel Currier. It is a nine-step lebenstreppe on a stone arch depicting a man's journey through alcoholism. Through a series of vignettes it shows how a single drink starts an arc that ends in suicide. Below the structure, the protagonist's wife and child stand in tears.

The lithograph is based on John Warner Barber's 1826 work The Drunkard's Progress, or The Direct Road to Poverty, Wretchedness, & Ruin. Critical reception has been poor since the image was released, but it influenced other temperance-themed works. The Drunkard's Progress is used in high school American history classes to teach about the temperance movement.

== Background ==
From the 1800s until the start of Prohibition in 1920, the temperance movement was a major force in American life, advocating a ban on alcoholic beverages. The movement came out of the Second Great Awakening and grew through revival meetings and missionary groups. To reformers of the era, alcohol abuse and slavery were seen as the two major social ills in the United States. Initially, temperance advocates pushed for people to abstain from drinking liquor, but by 1840, the focus on spirits was replaced with across-the-board teetotalism.

The company that would become Currier and Ives was founded in 1834 by Nathaniel Currier. It would grow to be the go-to publisher and manufacturer of mass-produced lithographs in the United States. Their low cost prints, which retailed between $0.15 and $3.00 depending on the size (equivalent to $4 and $76 in 2025, respectively), were found in homes and businesses across the country. Currier and Ives's works mostly depicted religious, moralistic, and patriotic scenes, as well as idealized versions of rural life. The Drunkard's Progress is one of several temperance-themed images in their catalogue which show how the consumption of alcohol leads to ruin.

== Creation ==
In 1826, John Warner Barber published The Drunkard's Progress, or The Direct Road to Poverty, Wretchedness, & Ruin, a four-part lithograph depicting a family's journey to the poorhouse due to consuming alcohol. Based on Barber's work, Currier created his similarly named The Drunkard's Progress: From the First Glass to the Grave in 1846.

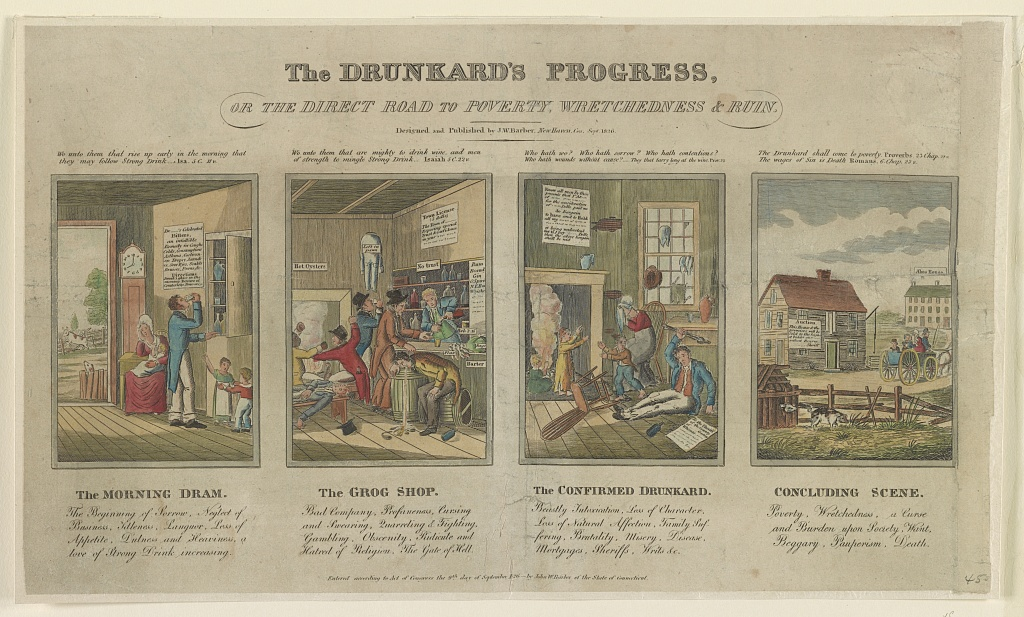
The Drunkard's Progress, or The Direct Road to Poverty, Wretchedness, & Ruin. John Warner Barber 1826.

== Description ==
The Drunkard's Progress is a lebenstreppe, a common visual device in the 1800s. Across the middle of the image is stone arch with ascending and then descending steps. The image uses the nine stairs to represent nine stages of alcoholism, as imagined by Currier. Below the stone structure, the male protagonist's wife and child stand by their burning home in tears.

According to the print, the path to ruin starts with a singular social drink provided to the protagonist by "a woman of evidently questionable virtue". He then progresses to drinking to "keep the cold out" and then, subsequently, to intoxication. At the fourth step, the protagonist starts to engage in violence while intoxicated. The arc peaks with the man, cigar in hand, partying with friends. The sixth step, and first down, depicts the man falling into poverty due to his use of alcohol. His friends then abandon him, which leads to him turning to crime out of desperation. The final stage shows the protagonist committing suicide with a gunshot to the head.

== Reception and legacy ==
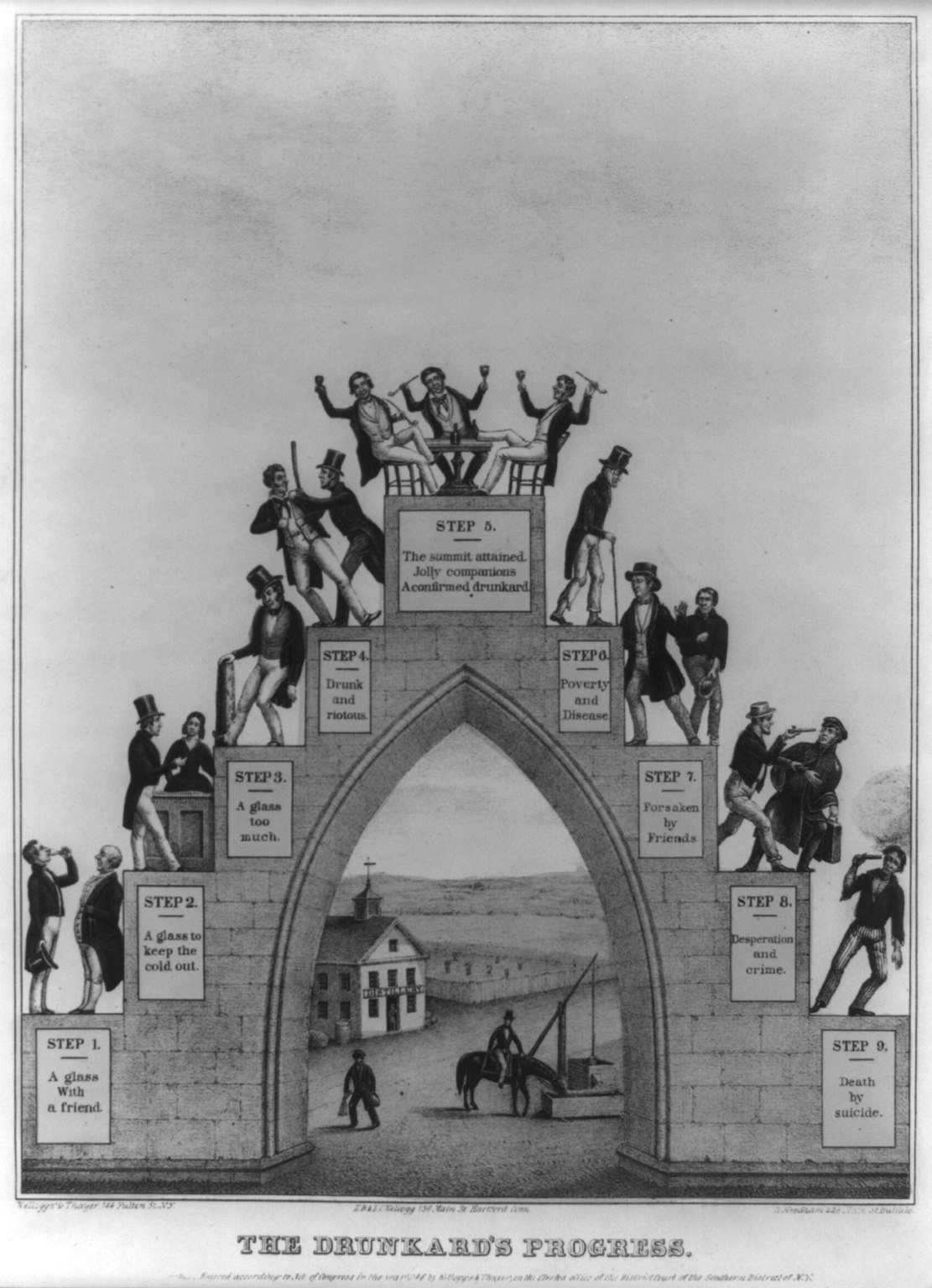
The Drunkard's Progress. Kellogg Brothers 1864.

The Drunkard's Progress has been mostly panned by commentators. Writing for The Baltimore Sun in 1930, Robert Sisk found the lithograph to be self-defeating by having the protagonist die by a gunshot instead of through drinking. Douglas Naylor described it as "prize-deserving" in a 1933 article in The Pittsburgh Press. In 1984, Tess Panfil, writing for The Berkshire Eagle, found the work to be overwrought in her review of a Currier and Ives exhibition.

The same year as Currier, the Kellogg Brothers released their own version of The Drunkard's Progress. In the Kelloggs' version, the family of the protagonist is replaced by a distillery and a man walking out the front with two money bags. English Professor John William Crowley suggests that the Kellogg Brothers copied their version from Currier.

With The Drunkard's Progress, Currier established the plot arc used in temperance novels: a first drink quickly leading to a premature death. Mary Grover, Or, The Trusting Wife: A Domestic Temperance Tale was explicitly written by Charles Burdett to turn the image into a book. George's Mother by Stephen Crane was also influenced by the lithograph.

The work is presented as a primary source in classes on American history to teach about the temperance movement. One social studies teacher said he uses it because the progression of alcoholism depicted closely matches the message of anti-drug programing in schools such as D.A.R.E. Students have compared the simplistic "just say no" messaging of The Drunkard's Progress with Faces of Meth.
