= Nathaniel Currier =

American lithographer (1813–1888)

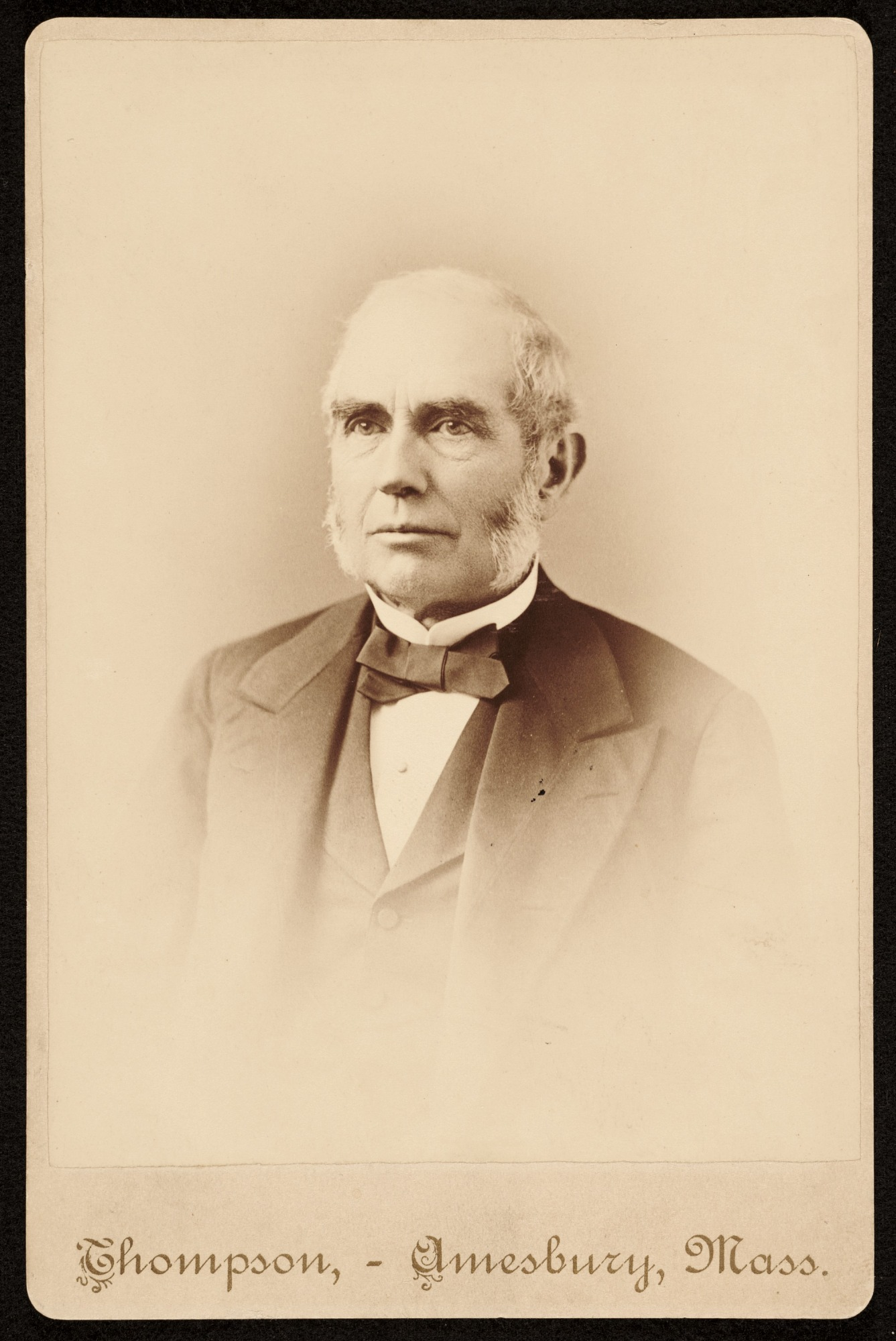
- Born: March 27, 1813; Roxbury, Massachusetts, U.S.
- Died: November 20, 1888 (aged 75); Amesbury, Massachusetts, U.S.
- Resting place: Green-Wood Cemetery in Brooklyn, New York, U.S.
- Known for: Lithography
- Relatives: Edward Wilson Currier (nephew); Jon Gould (great-great nephew)

Nathaniel Currier (March 27, 1813 – November 20, 1888) was an American lithographer. He headed the company Currier & Ives with James Ives.

== Early life and education ==
Currier was born in Roxbury, Massachusetts, to Nathaniel and Hannah Currier. He attended public school until age fifteen, when he was apprenticed to the Boston printing firm of William and John Pendleton.

== Career ==
The Pendletons were the first successful lithographers in the United States, lithography having only recently been invented in Europe. Currier learned the process in their shop. In 1833, he subsequently went to work for M. E. D. Brown in Philadelphia, in 1833. The following year, in 1834, Currier moved to New York City, where he intended to start a new business with John Pendleton but Pendleton backed out, and the new firm became Currier & Stodart and lasted only one year.

=== Currier & Ives ===
In 1835, Currier started his own lithographic business as an eponymous sole proprietorship, initially engaged in standard lithographic business of printing sheet music, letterheads, handbills, and other publishing-related products.

However, he soon took his work in a new direction, creating pictures of current events. In late 1835, he issued a print illustrating a recent fire in New York City, Ruins of the Merchant's Exchange N.Y. after the Destructive Conflagration of Decbr 16 & 17, 1835 was published by the New York Sun, just four days after the fire, and was an early example of illustrated news. In 1840, Currier began to move away from job printing and into independent print publishing. In that year, The Sun published his print Awful Conflagration of the Steam Boat 'Lexington' in Long Island Sound on Monday Eveg Jany 13th 1840, by Which Melancholy Occurrence Over 100 Persons Perished, another documentation of a news event, three days after the disaster; the print sold thousands of copies.

In 1850, James Ives went to work for Currier's firm as bookkeeper. Ives' skills as a businessman and marketer contributed significantly to the growth of the company; in 1857 he was made a full partner, and the company became known as Currier & Ives.

Currier & Ives are best known as creators of popular art prints, such as Christmas scenes, landscapes, or depictions of Victorian urban sophistication; however, the firm also produced political cartoons and banners, significant historical scenes, and further illustrations of current events. Over the decades, the firm created roughly 7,500 images.

Currier retired from his firm in 1880, and turned the business over to his son Edward.

== Personal life and death ==
Currier married Eliza West Farnsworth in 1840. The couple had one child, Edward West Currier, the next year. Eliza died in 1843. In 1847, Currier married Lura Ormsbee.

In addition to being a lithographer, he was also a New York City volunteer fireman in the 1850s.

He was a Unitarian.

Currier was a friend of P.T. Barnum of Barnum and Bailey fame.

Currier was fond of fast horses and kept several at a barn in his Massachusetts residence, which he purchased, ordered dismantled, and had delivered by horse to his estate.

Currier died eight years after retiring, on November 20, 1888, at his home on Lion's Mouth Road in Amesbury, Massachusetts and is interred at Green-Wood Cemetery in Brooklyn.

== Gallery ==
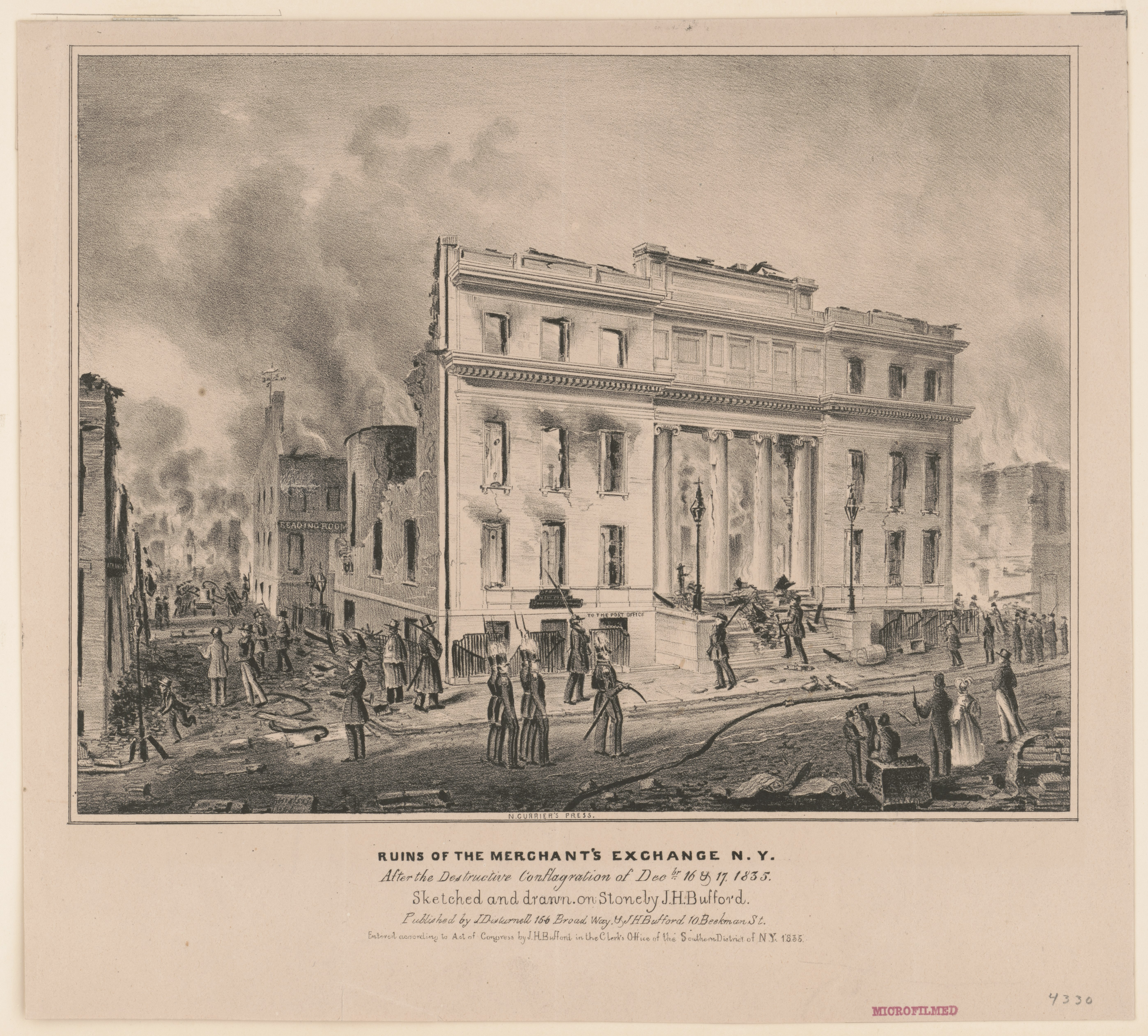
Ruins of the Merchant's Exchange N.Y. after the Destructive Conflagration of Decbr 16 & 17, 1835

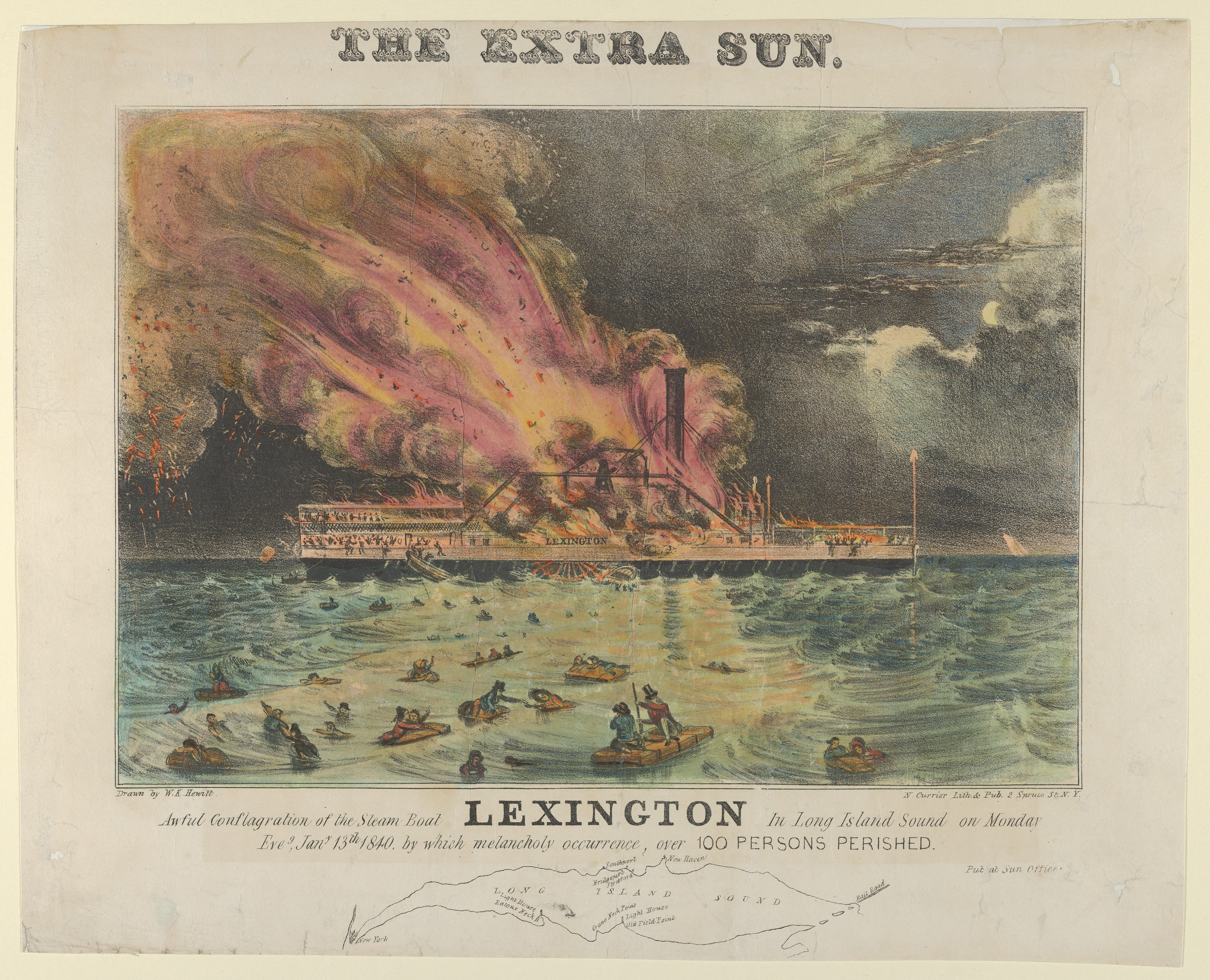
Awful Conflagration of the Steam Boat 'Lexington' in Long Island Sound on Monday Eveg Jany 13th 1840, by Which Melancholy Occurrence Over 100 Persons Perished

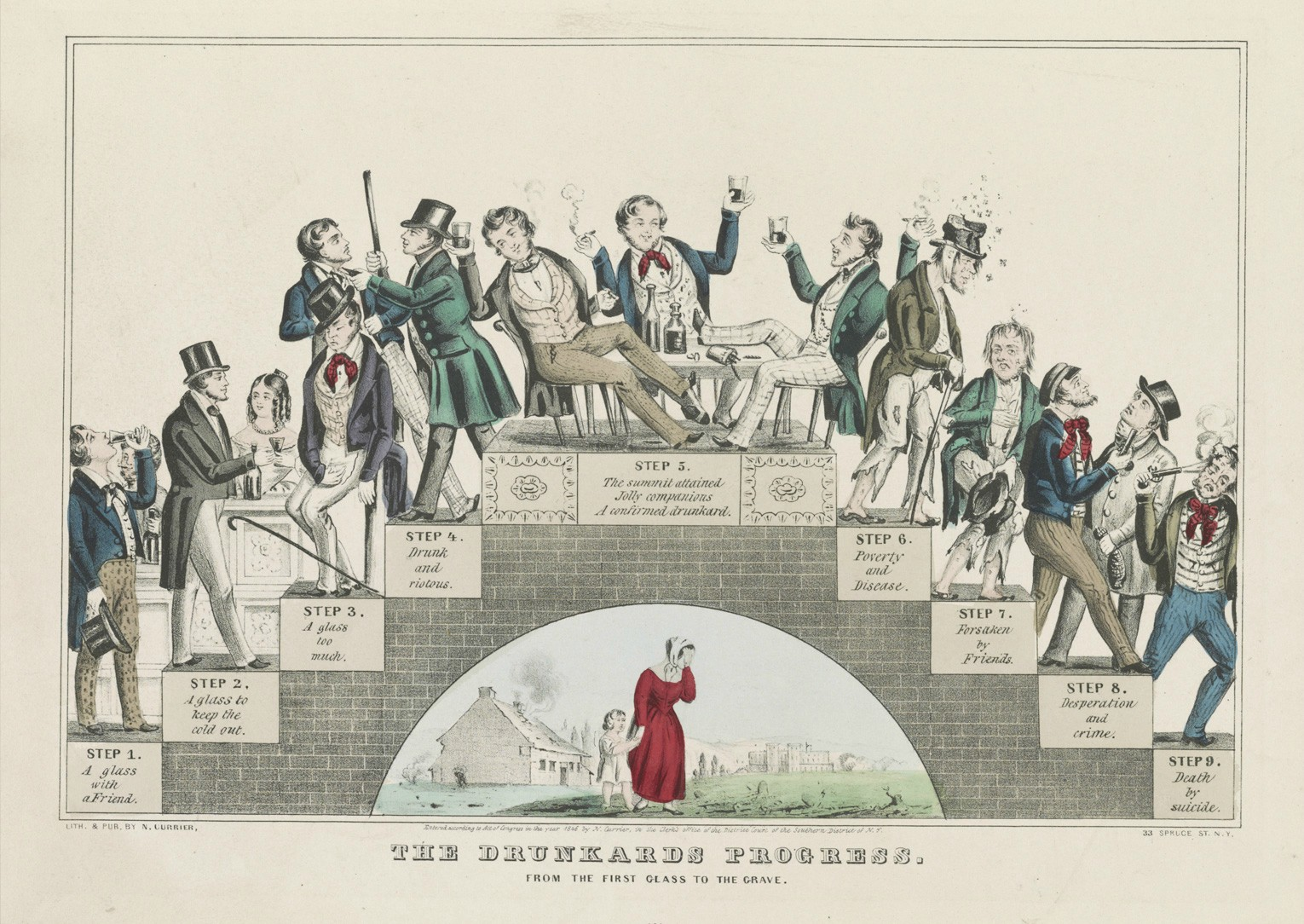
The Drunkard's Progress. Lithograph. Version of the Lebenstreppe that supports the temperance movement, 1846

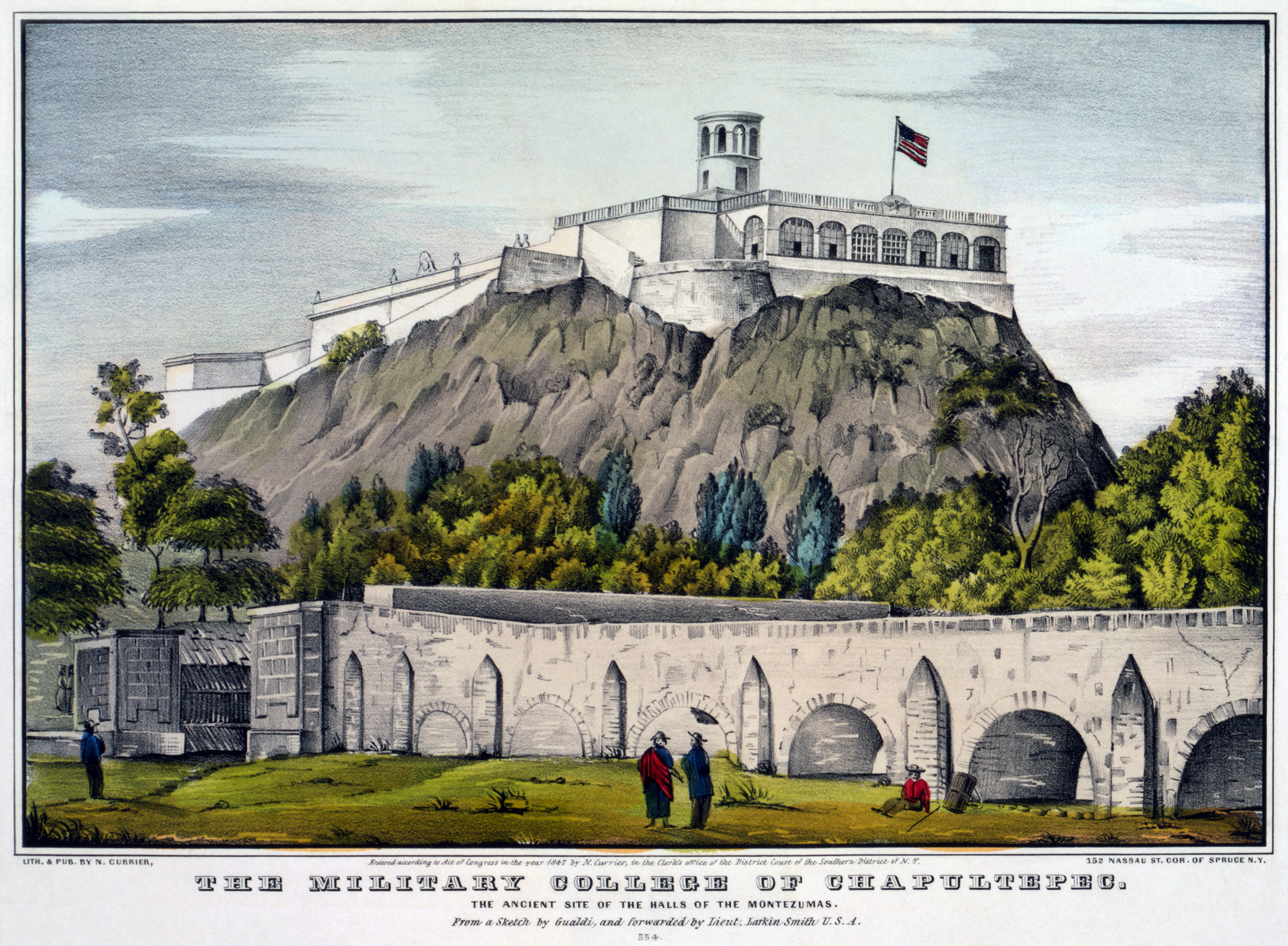
"Military College at Chapultepec", hand tinted lithograph published by Nathaniel Currier as a sole proprietor, c. 1847

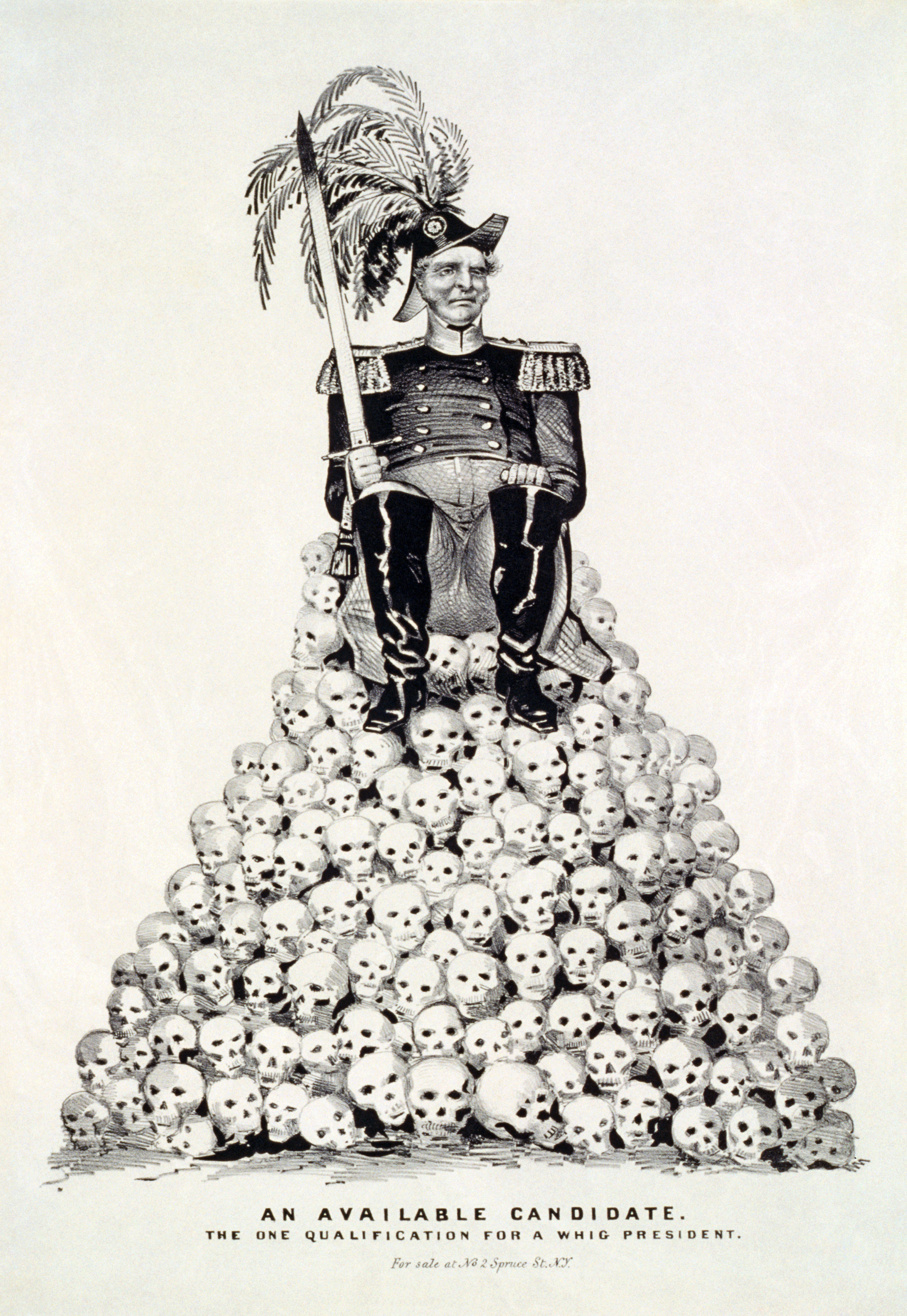
"An Available Candidate: The One Qualification for a Whig President". Political cartoon about the 1848 presidential election which refers to Zachary Taylor or Winfield Scott, the two leading contenders for the Whig Party nomination in the aftermath of the Mexican–American War. Published 1848, digitally restored.

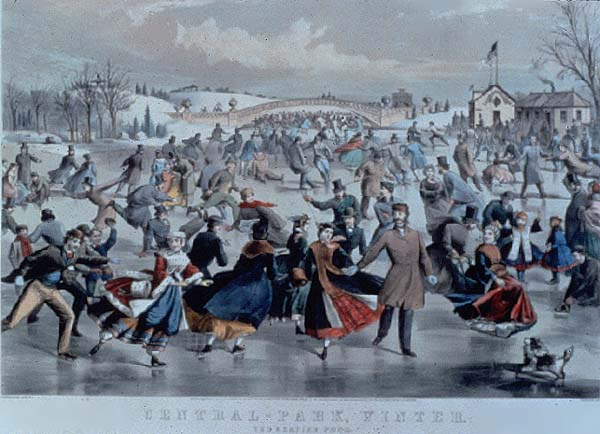
Currier & Ives' Central-Park, Winter: The Skating Pond, 1862

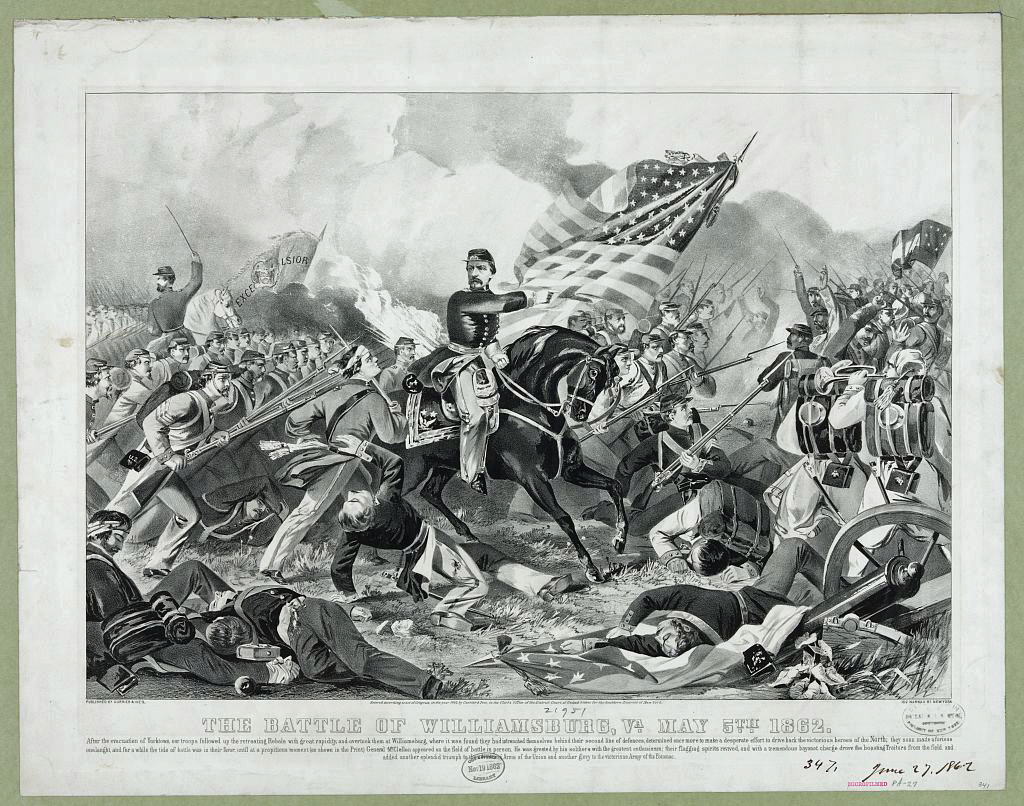
Civil War Battle of Williamsburg, 1862

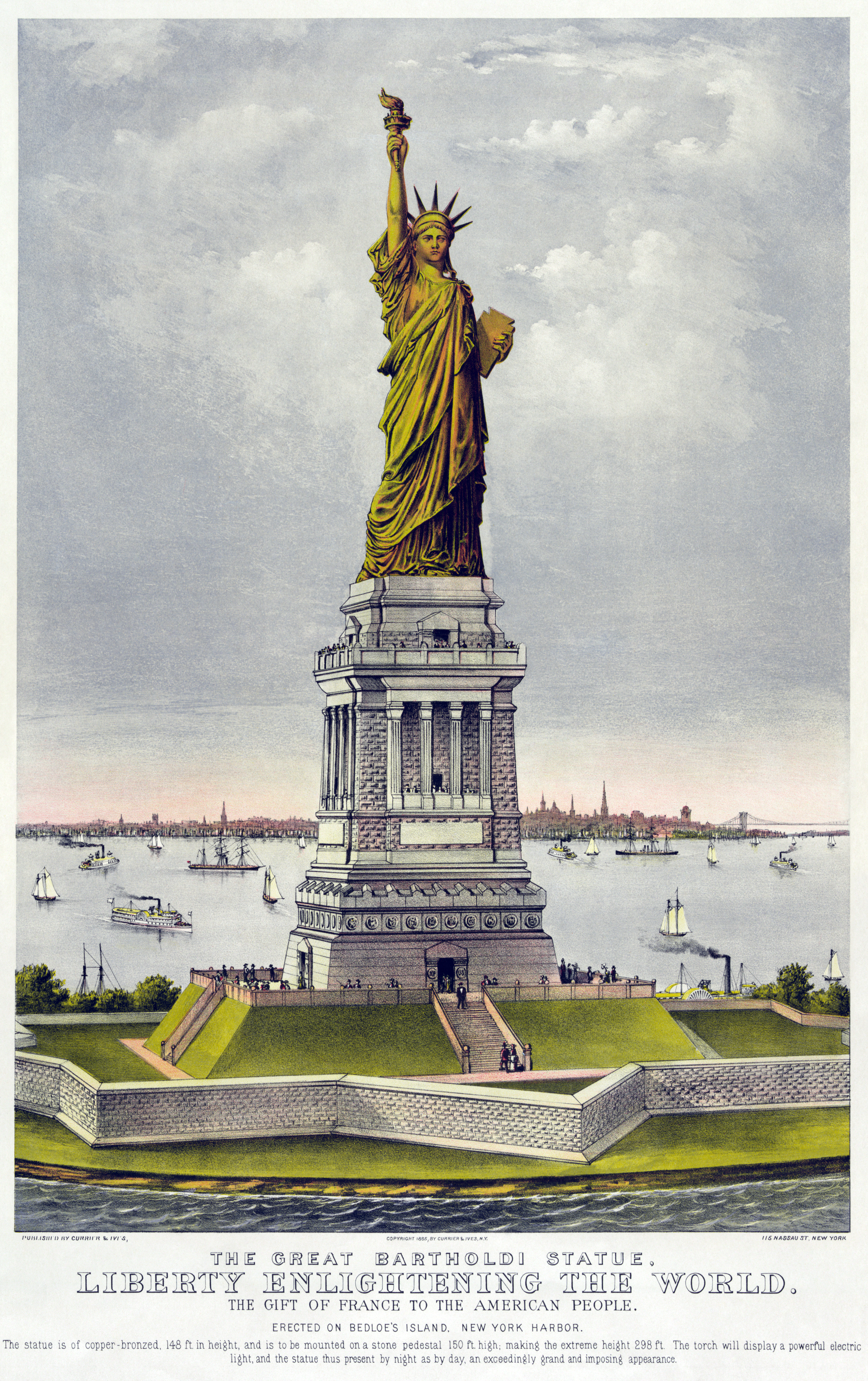
The Statue of Liberty: The Great Bartholdi Statue, Liberty Enlightening the World: The Gift of France to the American People, 1885
