= John Norman (publisher) =

John Norman (1748–1817) was an engraver and publisher in Boston, Massachusetts, in the later 18th and early 19th century. "Born in England; came to Philadelphia in 1774 'from London,' as an 'architect and landscape engraver;' though he also did all manner of silversmith's work. He went to Boston about 1780." He died in 1817 and was buried in Copp's Hill Burying Ground.

== See also ==
- Boston Magazine (1783–86), published by Norman
- Boston Directory. Norman published the first issue in 1789.
