= Lebenstreppe =

Art motif of life as a series of steps

A Lebenstreppe or Stufenalter (German: "steps of life" or "stages of life") is a pictorial representation of the human life as a series of ascending and descending steps. The tradition began in fifteenth-century Europe and many hundreds of variations were produced until the early twentieth century, though the popularity of the tradition waned during the nineteenth century. The most common variation depicts ten steps each representing ten years, with the peak at fifty. Parodic versions have been created for satiric, moralistic, and advertising purposes.

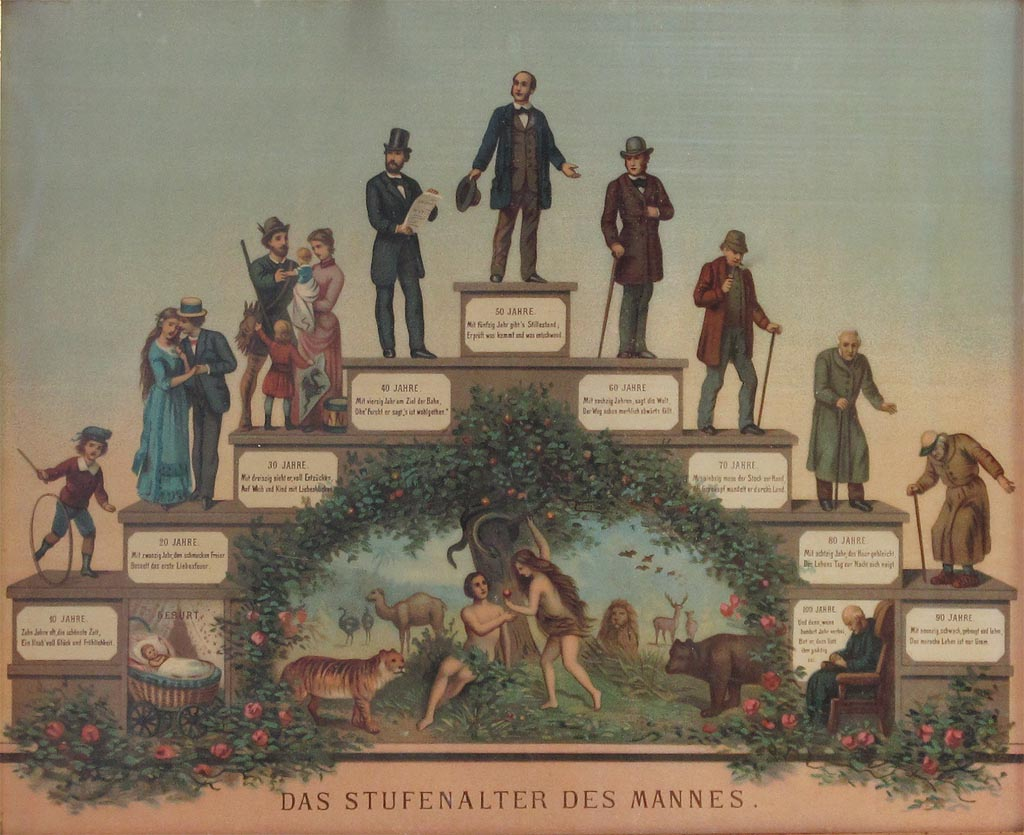
"Das Stufenalter des Mannes". Verlag Gustav May Söhne, Frankfurt, c. 1900.

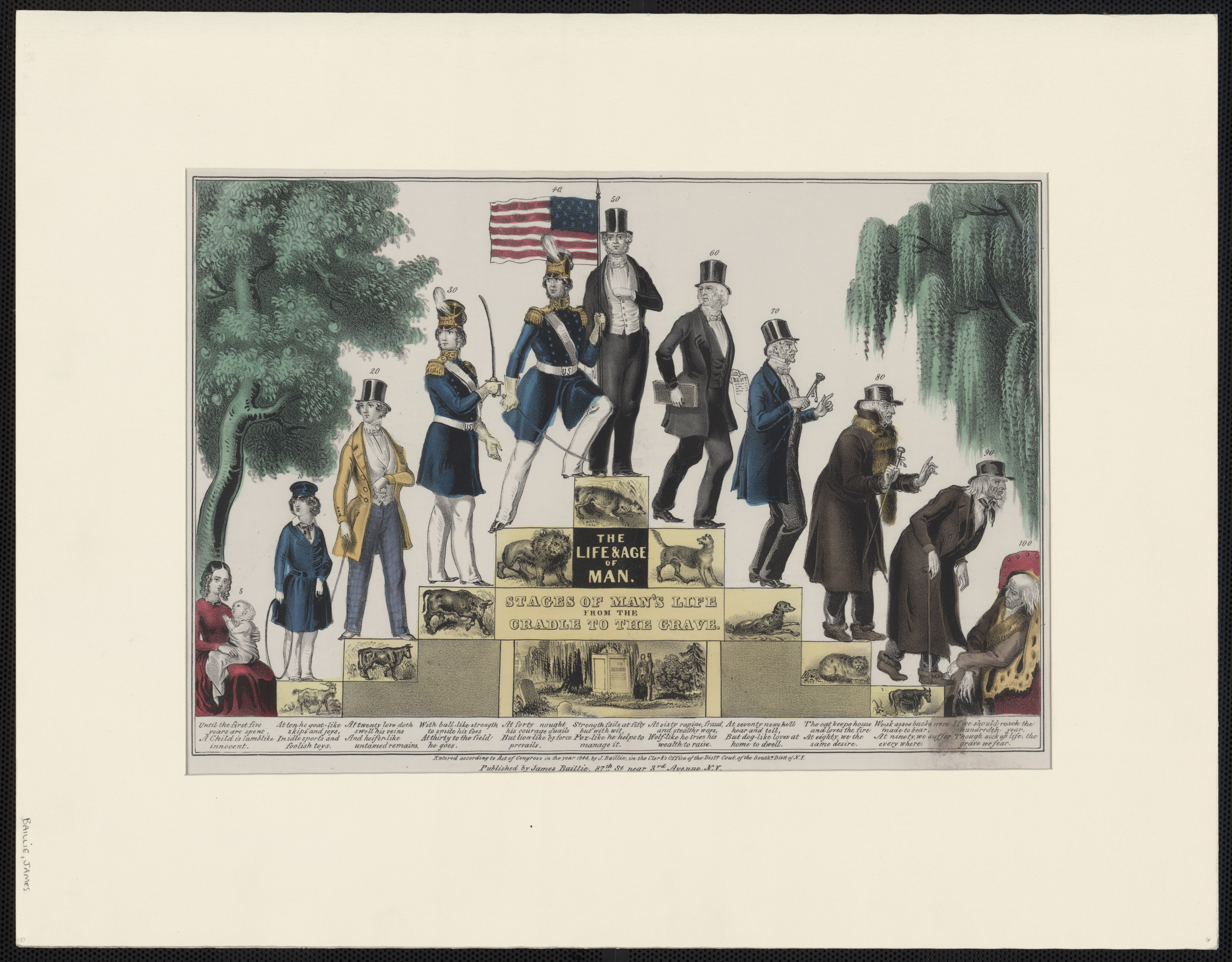
James Baillie, 1848. "The Life and age of man, stages of man's life from the cradle to the grave".

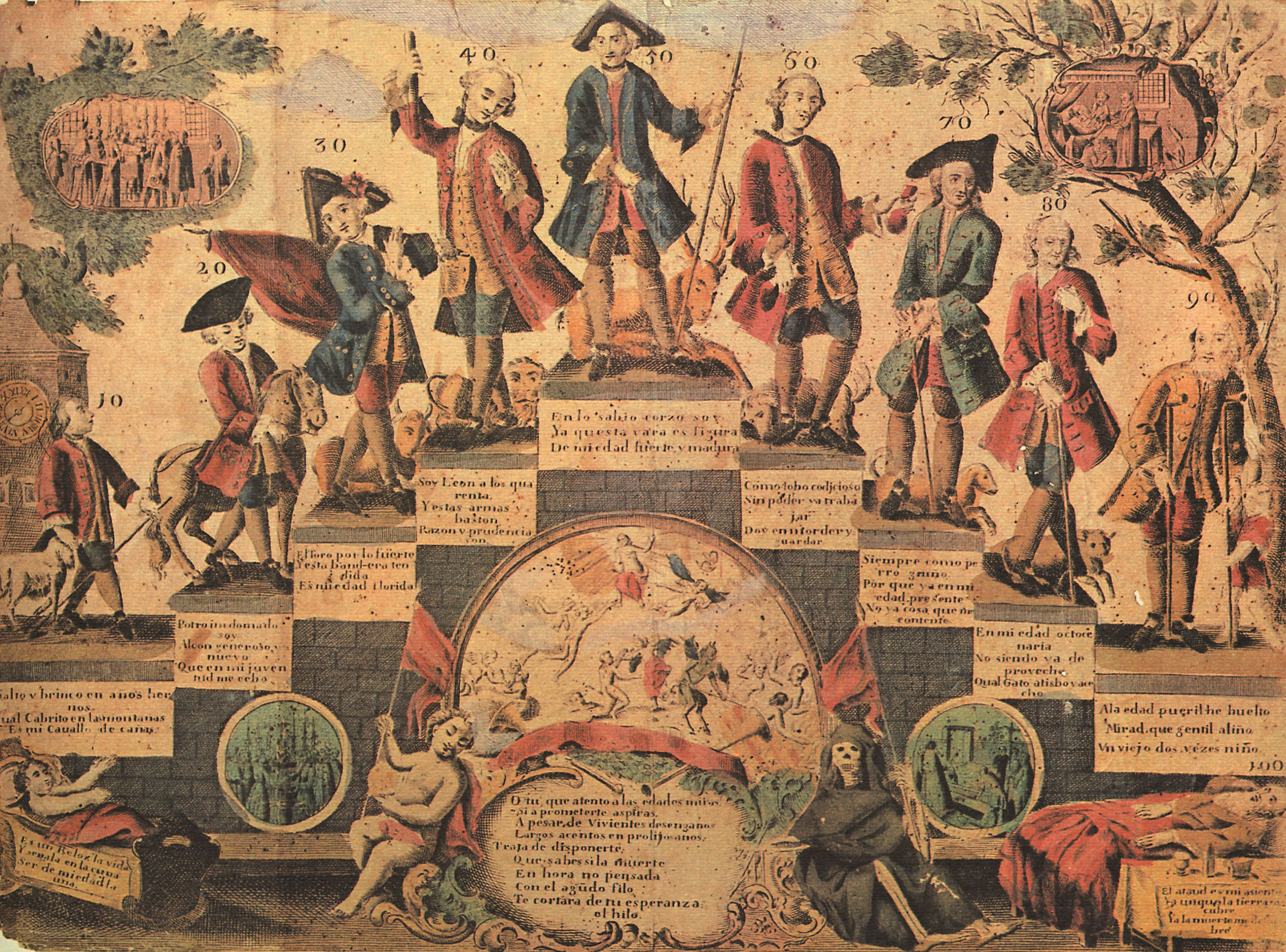
Unknown Spanish artist, c. 1750

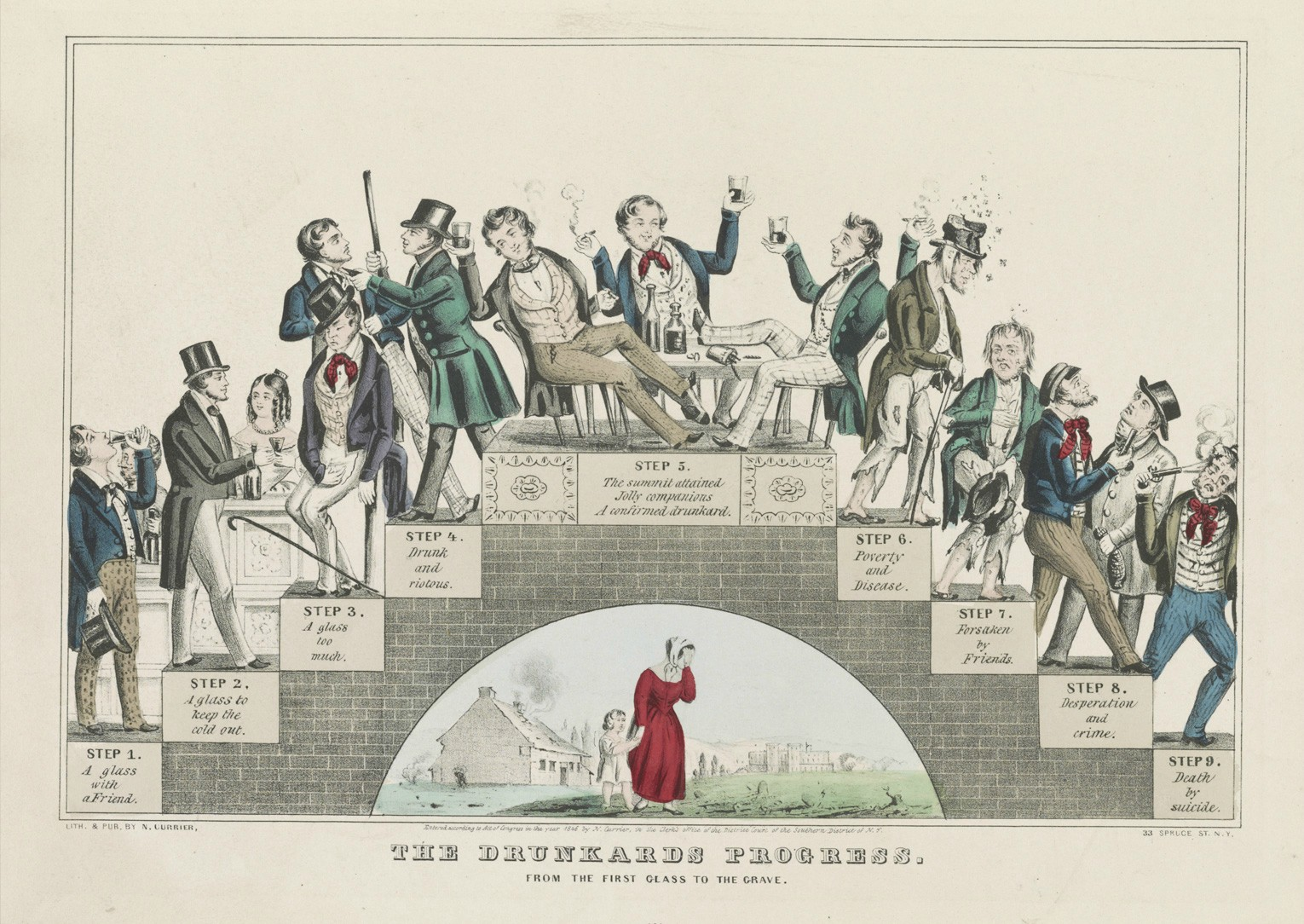
Nathaniel Currier, c. 1846. "The Drunkard's Progress: from the first glass to the grave". Lithograph in support of the temperance movement.

== See also ==
- Seven ages of man
