= Boston Magazine (1783–1786) =

US-American periodical (1783–1786)

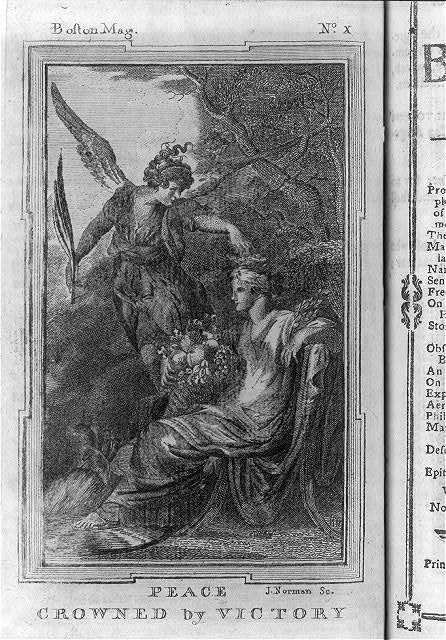
- Frontispiece from Boston Magazine, August 1784: "Peace Crowned by Victory"
- Publishing society: John Eliot, James Freeman, George R. Minot, Aaron Dexter, John Clarke, John Bradford, Benjamin Lincoln, and Christopher Gore
- Categories: Regional magazine
- Publisher: Norman & White
- Founded: 1783
- Final issue: October 1786
- Country: United States
- Based in: Boston, Massachusetts
- Language: English
- ISSN: 2157-0450
- OCLC: 1536861

Boston Magazine was produced in Boston, Massachusetts, from 1783 to 1786. It originated from the efforts of "a society for compiling a magazine in the town of Boston;" the society consisted of John Eliot, James Freeman, George R. Minot, Aaron Dexter, John Clarke, John Bradford, Benjamin Lincoln, Christopher Gore, and others. Publishers included John Norman, James White, Edmund Freeman, and Joseph Greenleaf. "An interesting feature of The Boston Magazine was the printing of a Geographical Gazetteer of Massachusetts, which came out as a serial number at the end of certain issues. ... In this supplement an account of twenty-one towns in Suffolk County is given." "The magazine ceased publication with Volume IV for October 1786."
