= Herald of Freedom (Boston newspaper) =

Newspaper in Boston, Massachusetts

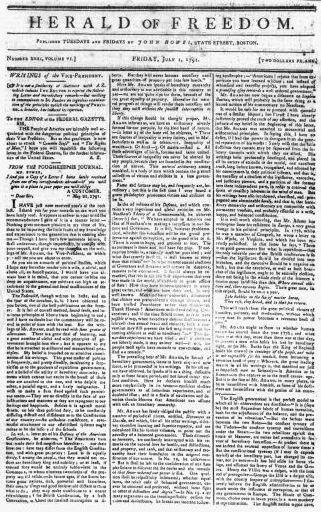
Herald of Freedom, July 1791

The Herald of Freedom (1788–1791) or Herald of Freedom and the Federal Advertiser was a newspaper published in Boston, Massachusetts, in the late 18th century by Edmund Freeman, Loring Andrews, and John Howel.

In 1790–1791 the paper "was engaged in the first libel-suit tried in Massachusetts after the Revolution, ... for a savage attack on a member of the Legislature," John Gardiner. The Herald's printer, Edmund Freeman, was "charged ... with publishing in his paper ... a most ... scandalous and malicious libel." "The libel complained of, charged Mr. Gardiner, with the atrocious murder of his late excellent lady [Margaret Harries], by cruelty." On February 3, 1790, "at 12, o'clock, at noon" Freeman "was taken into custody, by virtue of a warrant from Mr. Justice Crafts." "The case was decided in favor of the newspaper. Harrison Gray Otis, one of the most brilliant men of his day, was counsel for the editor."
