= Kellogg Brothers =

19th-century American lithographers

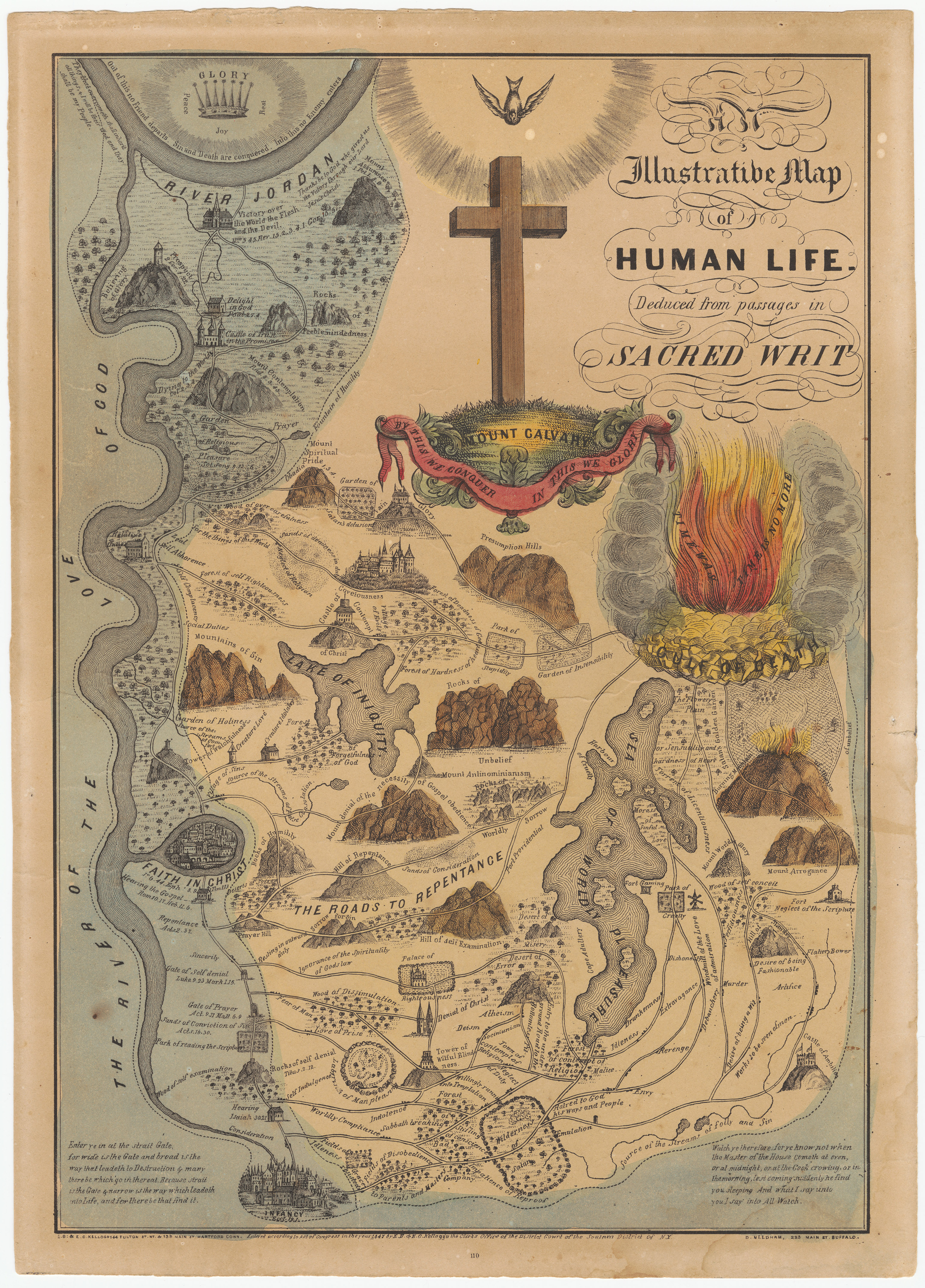
An Illustrative Map of Human Life Deduced from passages in Sacred Writ, printed by Kellogg Brothers, 1847.

The Kellogg Brothers were a family of lithographers and printmakers in Hartford, Connecticut from about 1830 to the end of the 19th century. The brothers were Jarvis Griggs Kellogg (1805–1873), Daniel Wright Kellogg (1807–1874), Edmund Burke Kellogg (1809–1872), and Elijah Chapman Kellogg (1811–1881). They operated in a series of partnerships, between themselves and with others, the firms having a variety of names that involved "Kellogg". They issued decorative prints that became popular for domestic use in American homes; they were second to the New York firm of Currier & Ives in their commercial success.
