= Frances "Fanny" Palmer =

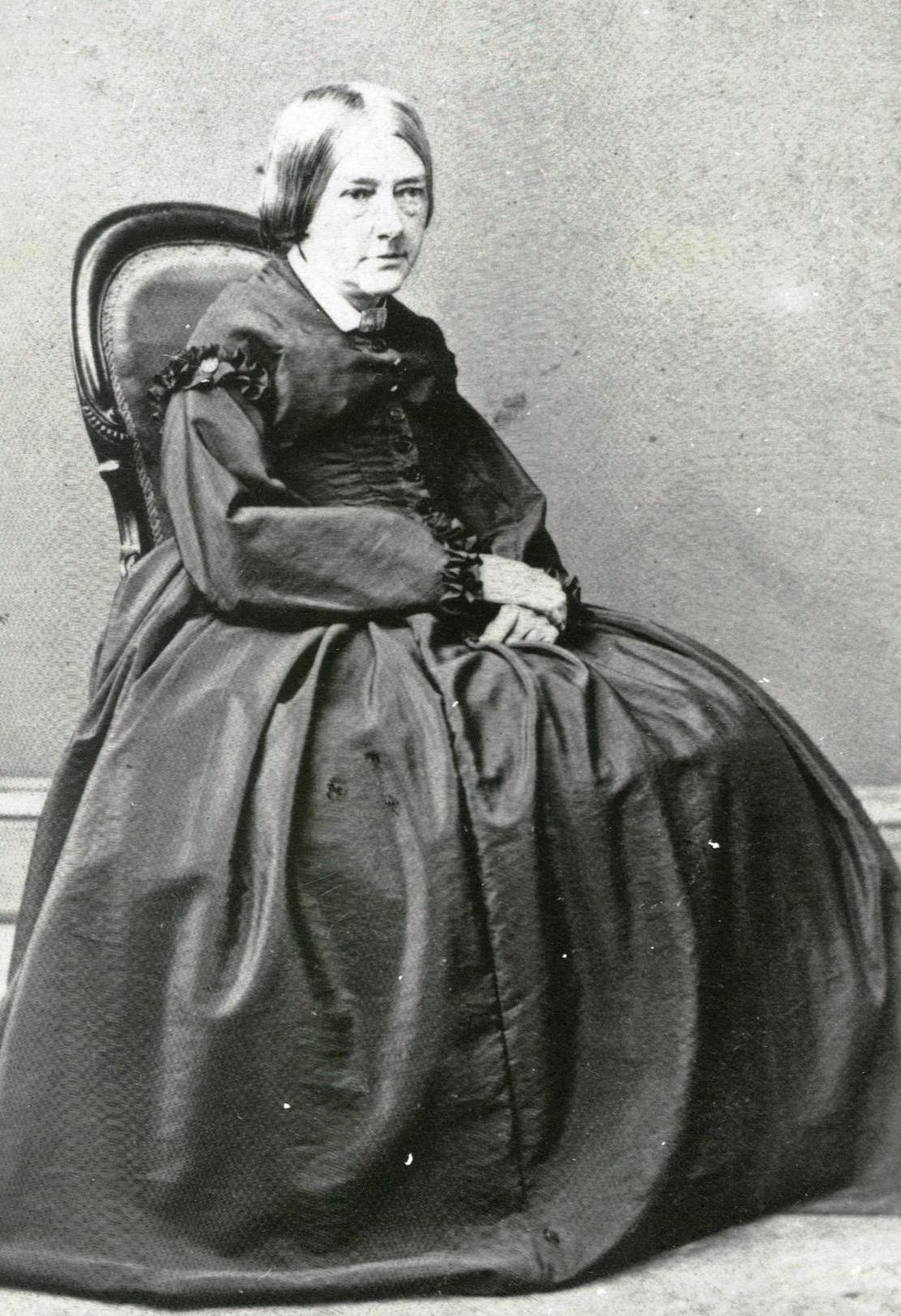
- Born: Frances Flora Bond; July 24, 1812; Leicester, England
- Died: August 20, 1876 (aged 64)
- Occupation(s): Artist, lithographer
- Known for: Lithographs for Currier and Ives
- Spouse: Edmund Seymour Palmer (m. 1832)
- Children: 2

Frances Flora Bond Palmer (July 24, 1812 – August 20, 1876), often referred to as Fanny Palmer, was an English artist who became successful in the United States as a lithographer for Currier and Ives.

== Early life ==
Frances Flora Bond, nicknamed "Fanny", was born in Leicester, England, on July 24, 1812. Her father, Robert Bond, had been a prosperous lawyer and left an ample legacy to his children, who grew up very well off. In her youth, Palmer, with her sister Maria, attended Miss Linwood's School for young ladies, a select private school in London run by needlework artist Mary Linwood. There she was instructed in music, literature, and the fine arts.

On July 13, 1832, Fanny married Edmund Seymour Palmer. They had a daughter, Frances E. Palmer, in 1833, and a son Edmund Jr., in 1835. Soon after her marriage, Palmer's family began experiencing financial difficulties. In 1942, Peters wrote that the reverse in their fortune caused the family to turn to their artistic talents as a means of earning a living. Described as charming, cultivated, talented and brave, Palmer was "not too proud to earn her own living." But the idea of an inexperienced romantic forced to earn her keep has been corrected by recent research showing she was a lithographer in England even before coming to America, and ran the F. Palmer and Co. firm in NYC, an "enterprising professional, one of the most versatile and prolific lithographers of her day."

== Early career ==
By 1841, the Palmers operated a lithography business together with Frances as the artist and Edmund as the printer. The first notice of their work appeared in the Leicester Journal on May 13, 1842. As an artist-printer team, the Palmers began a series of topographical prints under the title of Sketches of Leicestershire. These prints were very well received and often advertised in the Leicester Journal and the Leicester Chronicle amongst enthusiastic reviews.

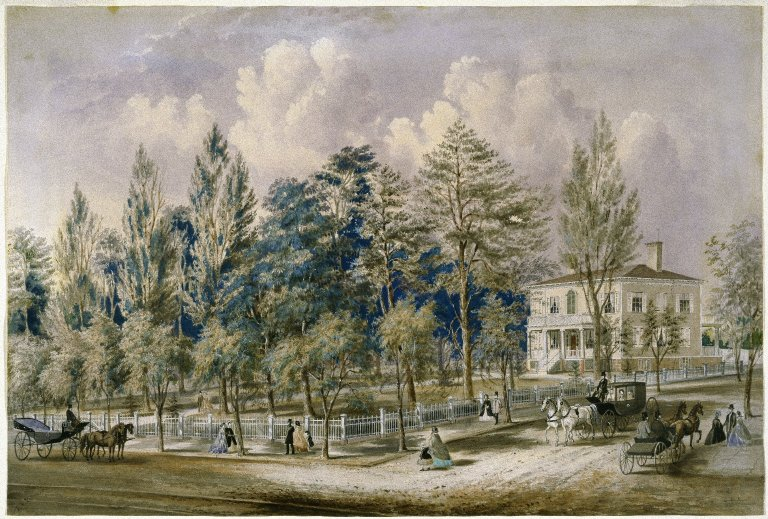
Samuel Fleet Homestead, Brooklyn, c.1850 Brooklyn Museum

Despite the high praise, the Palmers' business was unable to support them. Sometime between June, 1843, and January, 1844, the Palmers and Frances' siblings, Robert and Maria, decided to leave England to emigrate to New York in the United States. By moving to a new country, Frances and her family hoped to effect a change in their financial circumstances and to find a better outlet for their artistic talents.

Then living in Brooklyn, Palmer taught singing, painting, drawing and wax flower making and worked as a governess and chaperone. Also, she and her husband set themselves up in a printing business again. The couple sought work where they could find it, sometimes creating work for other publishers or making advertisements for businesses and reproducing architectural drawings. Palmer made prints of flowers and sheet music covers in addition to her own work. At this time, like other lithographers, Palmer took advantage of the news-hungry public and created several lithographs depicting imagined scenes of the Mexican War, proving she was capable of a wide variety of work.

When the Palmers were once again unable to secure enough work for themselves, their business failed for a second time. Nathaniel Currier then took over their stock and, recognizing Palmer's talents, hired her to work for his firm.

== Currier and Ives ==
During Palmer's association with the printing companies of N. Currier and Currier and Ives, between 1849–1868, she is credited with producing around two hundred lithographs. She participated in every stage of the lithographic printing process in some way and was widely renowned for her technical skills. She is also credited with assisting Nathaniel Currier in the improvement of existing lithographic technology, including Currier's own lithographic crayon.

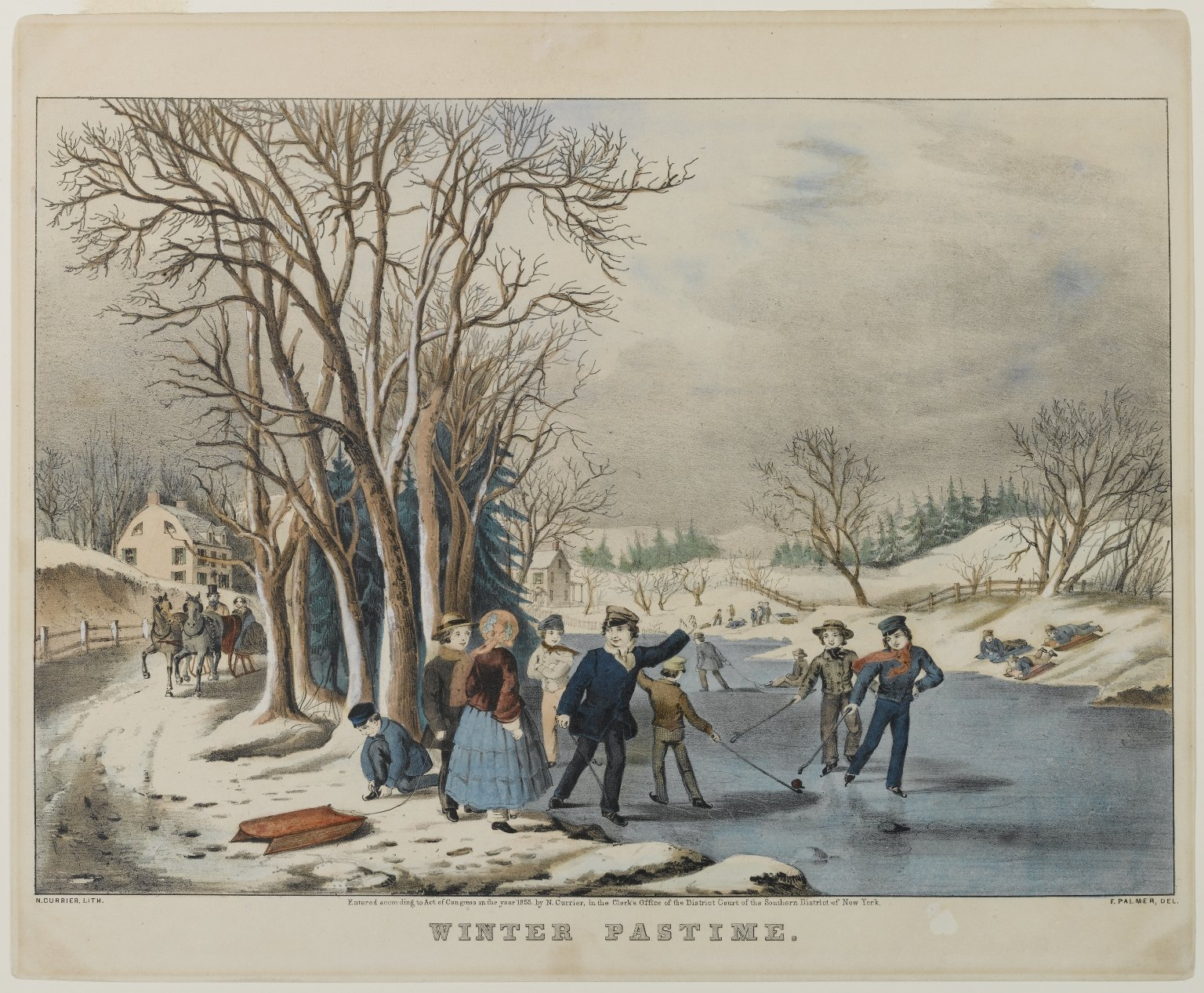
Winter Pastime, 1855. Brooklyn Museum

Palmer specialized in landscape and genre prints. Among her subjects were rural farm scenes, famous American ships and architecture, hunters, and Western landscapes. A notable example of these prints during her time with Currier and Ives is her highly regarded series of six bird hunting scenes. Palmer sketched these scenes from life using her husband Edmund Palmer, his friends, and their hunting dogs as models. Each medium-folio print is labeled "Drawing from nature and on stone by FF Palmer", and was priced at two dollars at the time of its publication in 1852.

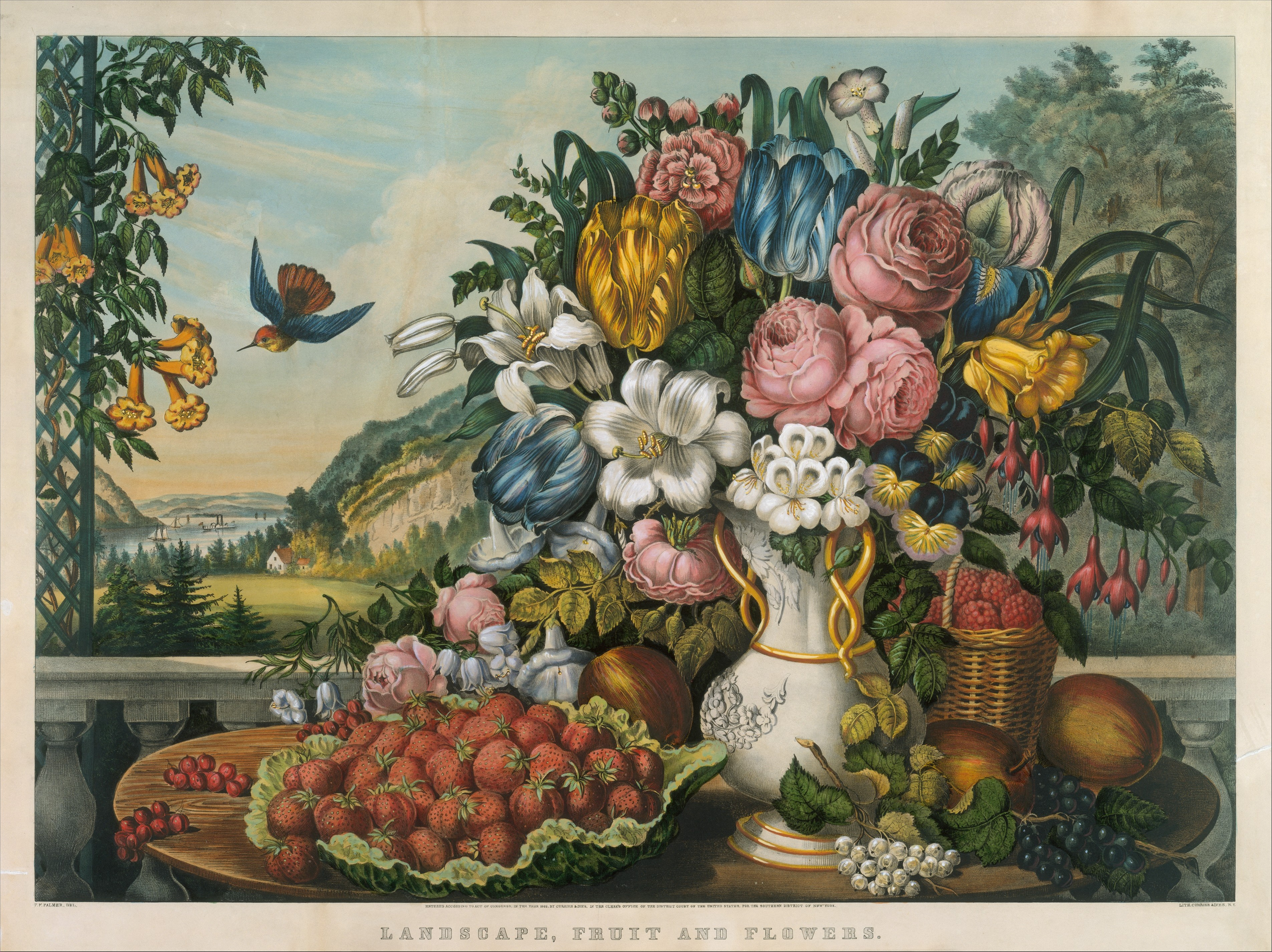
Landscape, Fruit, and Flowers, Frances Flora Bond Palmer, 1862

Palmer created most of her work by beginning with rough sketches from life. Often, Currier and Ives would send her by carriage to Long Island to do on-site landscape work.

Though her work was mainly directed by the type of prints that Currier and Ives wanted to sell or determined by preexisting prints, her few original pieces received praise for their compositional fluidity and technical skill. Her most notable original work is titled Landscape, Fruit, and Flowers, published in 1862. In Still Life Painting in America, Wolfgang Born describes the composition of this work as "flawless." He also describes the piece as an example of early chromolithography anticipating the impressionist movement.

Between 1859 and 1860, immediately following the change of the name of the company from N. Currier to Currier and Ives, no prints are signed by Palmer herself. This is most likely because of her grief following the death of her husband, which occurred around the same time.

There are several possible reasons why Palmer may have decided to leave Currier and Ives although she was successful with them. Mary Bartlett Cowdrey suggests that by the end of her career with Currier and Ives, "the heavy hand of James Merritt Ives had settled upon (her) stones," meaning that she no longer had the level of freedom she once did. There was also around the same time a shift in the taste of Currier and Ives' audience. Depictions of landscapes were no longer as popular as prints involving people, and according to Louis Maurer, one of Palmer's colleagues, her inability to draw the human figure was her only flaw.

== Later life ==
Little is known about Palmer's career after her time with Currier and Ives. After leaving their firm in 1868, she continued to be listed in directories as lithographer or artist, although she produced very little work. It is possible that she continued to take on private students at her home. Palmer's sister, Maria Bond, continued to live with her until Palmer's death from tuberculosis in 1876.

Palmer's daughter, Fanny E. Palmer, is also remembered as an artist and studied with her mother. There is speculation that she also produced some lithographs for Currier and Ives which are signed "F.E. Palmer," although this may simply be a mistake made by the letterpress.
