= Arthur Fitzwilliam Tait =

British-American painter

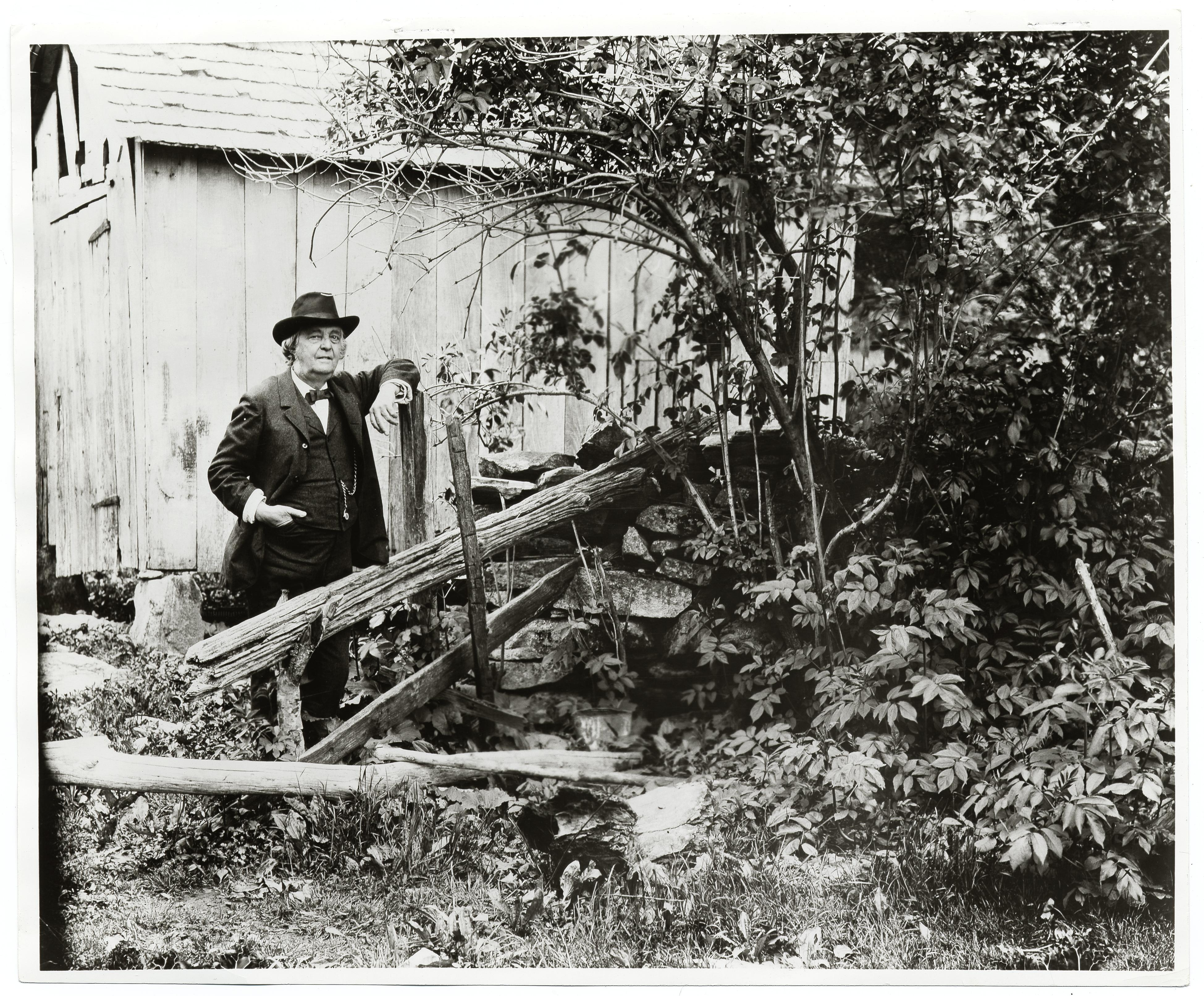
- Arthur Fitzwilliam Tait in 1893.
- Born: February 5, 1819; Livesey Hall
- Died: April 5, 1905 (aged 86)
- Movement: wildlife
- Awards: National Academy of Design

Arthur Fitzwilliam Tait (February 5, 1819 – April 28, 1905) was a British-American artist who is known mostly for his paintings of wildlife. During most of his career, he was associated with the New York City art scene.

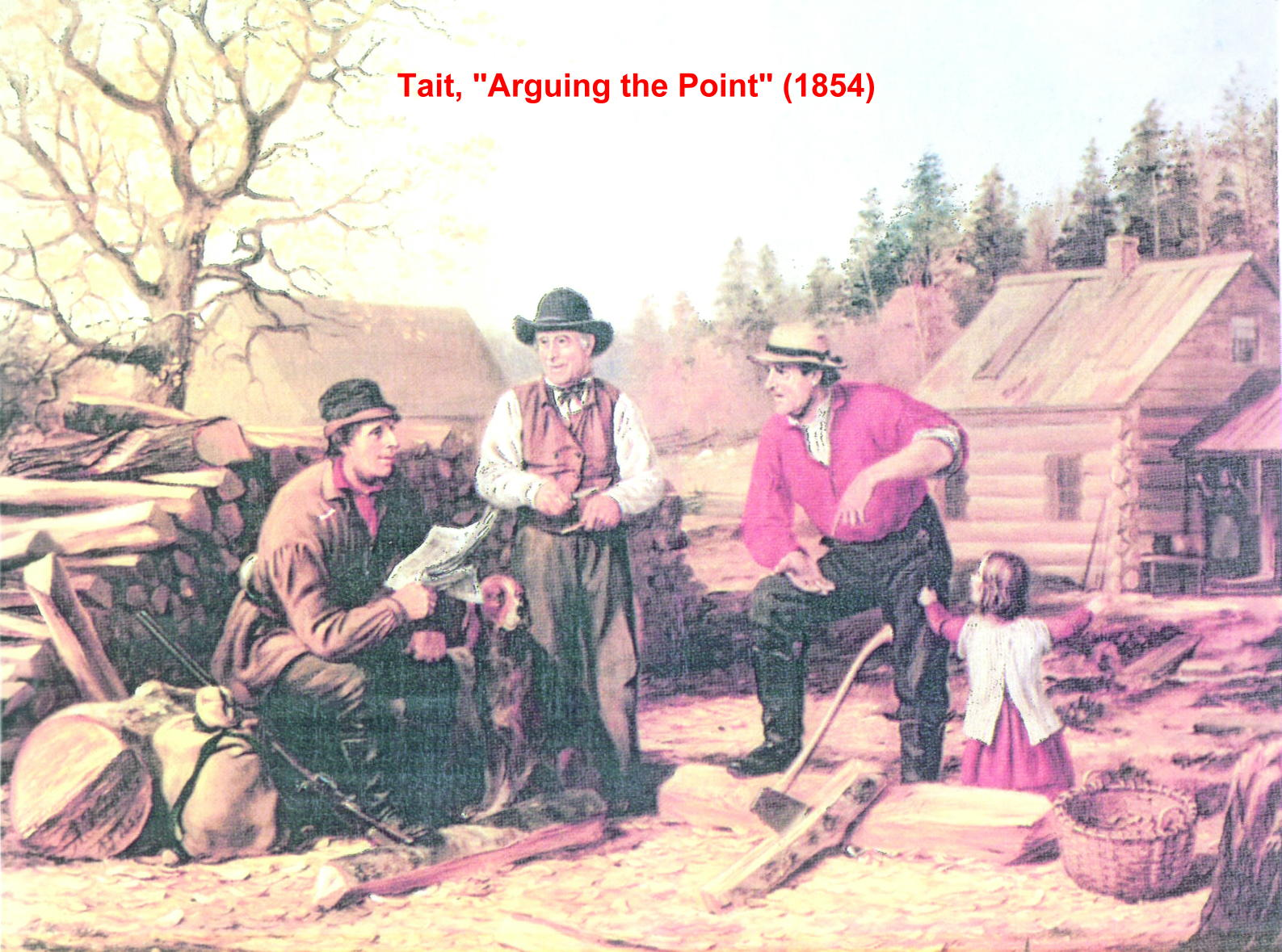
Americans arguing politics in 1854 while ignoring the farm chores.

== Life and career ==
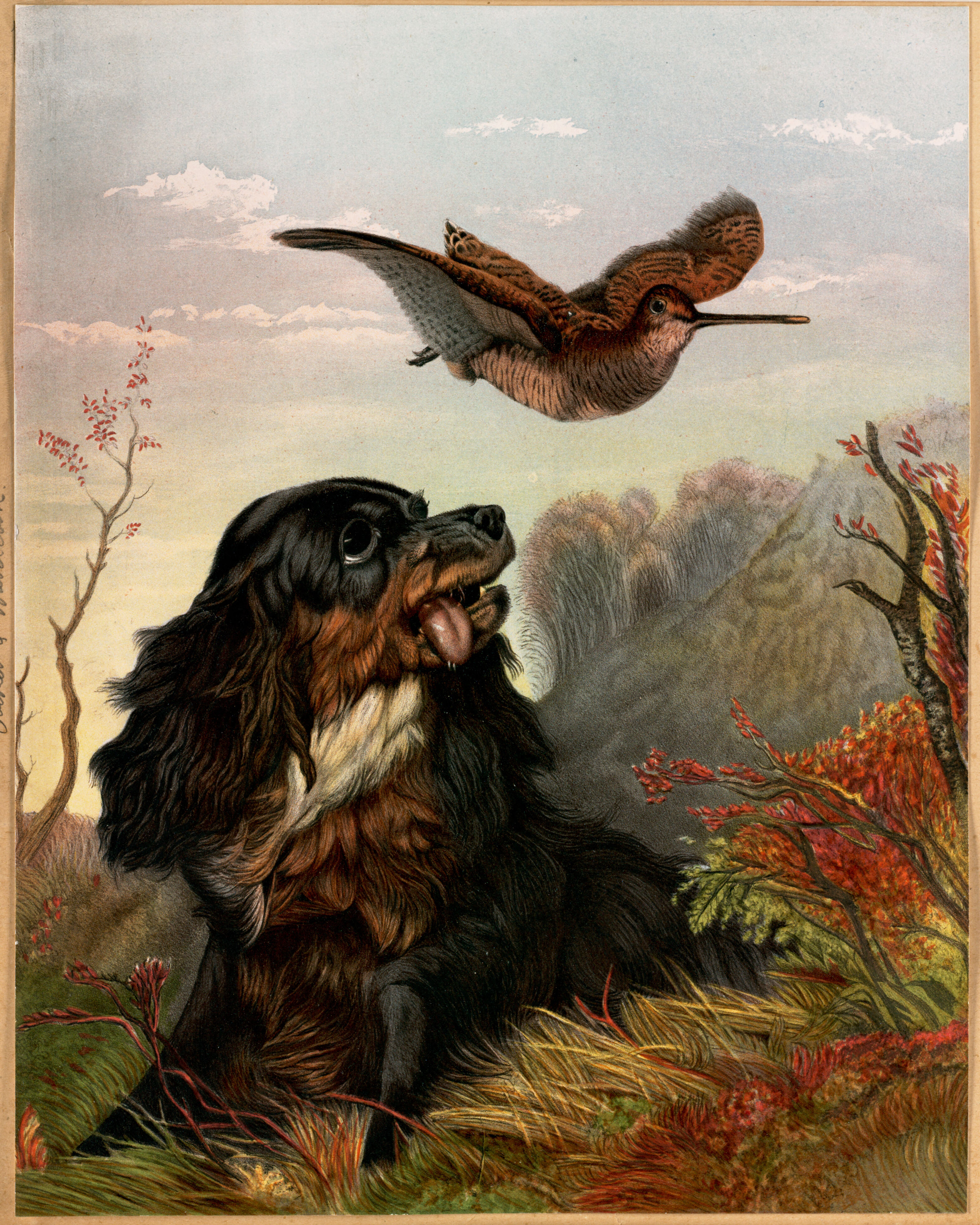
Cocker and woodcock, ca. 1861-1897; from the Louis Prang & Company Collection of the Boston Public Library

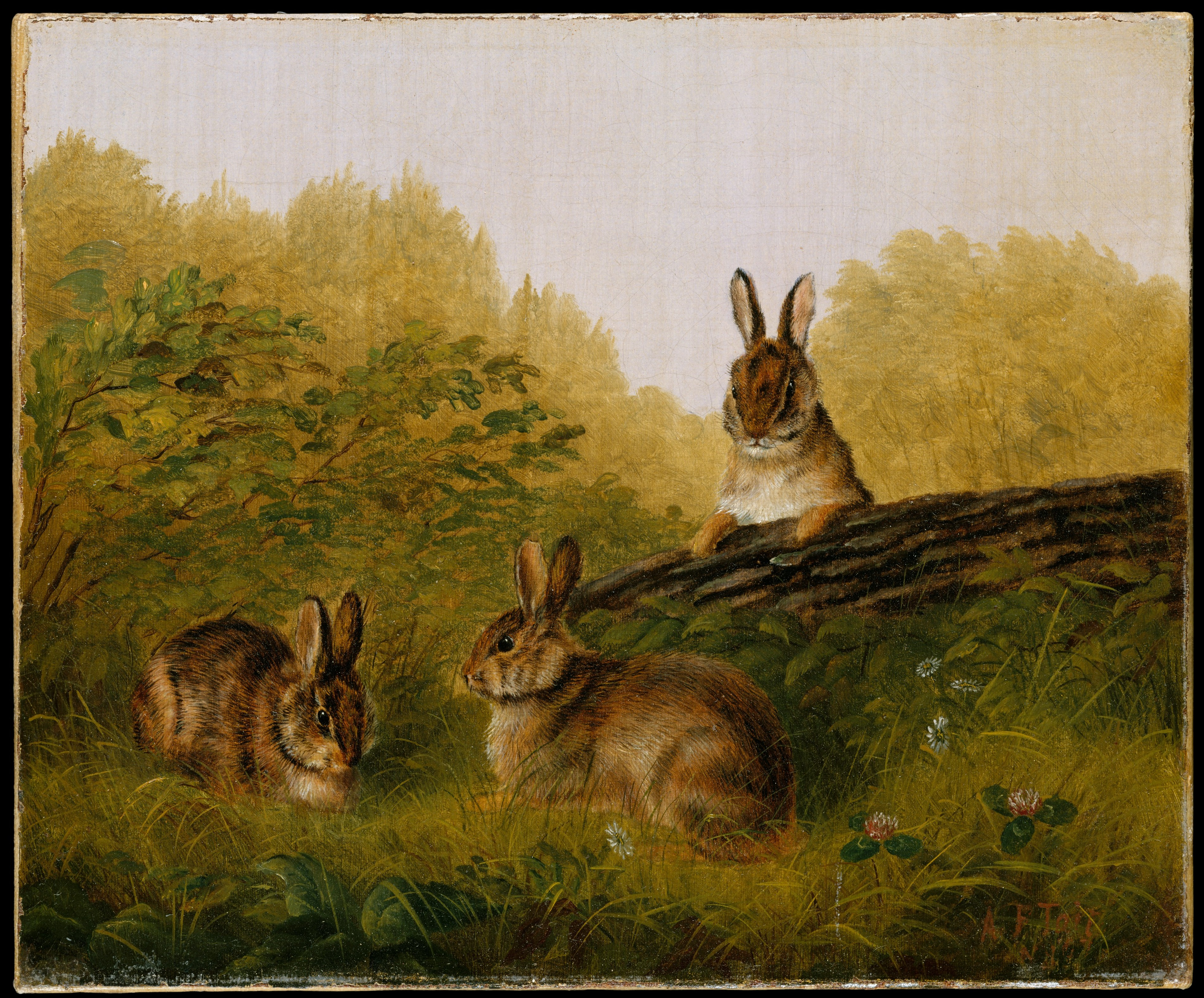
Rabbits on a Log, Arthur Fitzwilliam Tait, Metropolitan Museum of Art

Tait was born in Livesey Hall near Liverpool, England. At eight years old, (due to his father's bankruptcy) he was sent to live with relatives in Lancaster. It is during that time that he became attached to animals. Later on, in Manchester, England, Agnew & Zanetti Repository of Art acquired Arthur Tait who began self-learning to paint, as a twelve-year-old boy. His work consisted mostly of reproduced lithography that were exposed for Agnew's exhibitions. In 1838, he left the Agnew lithography reproduction business to marry.

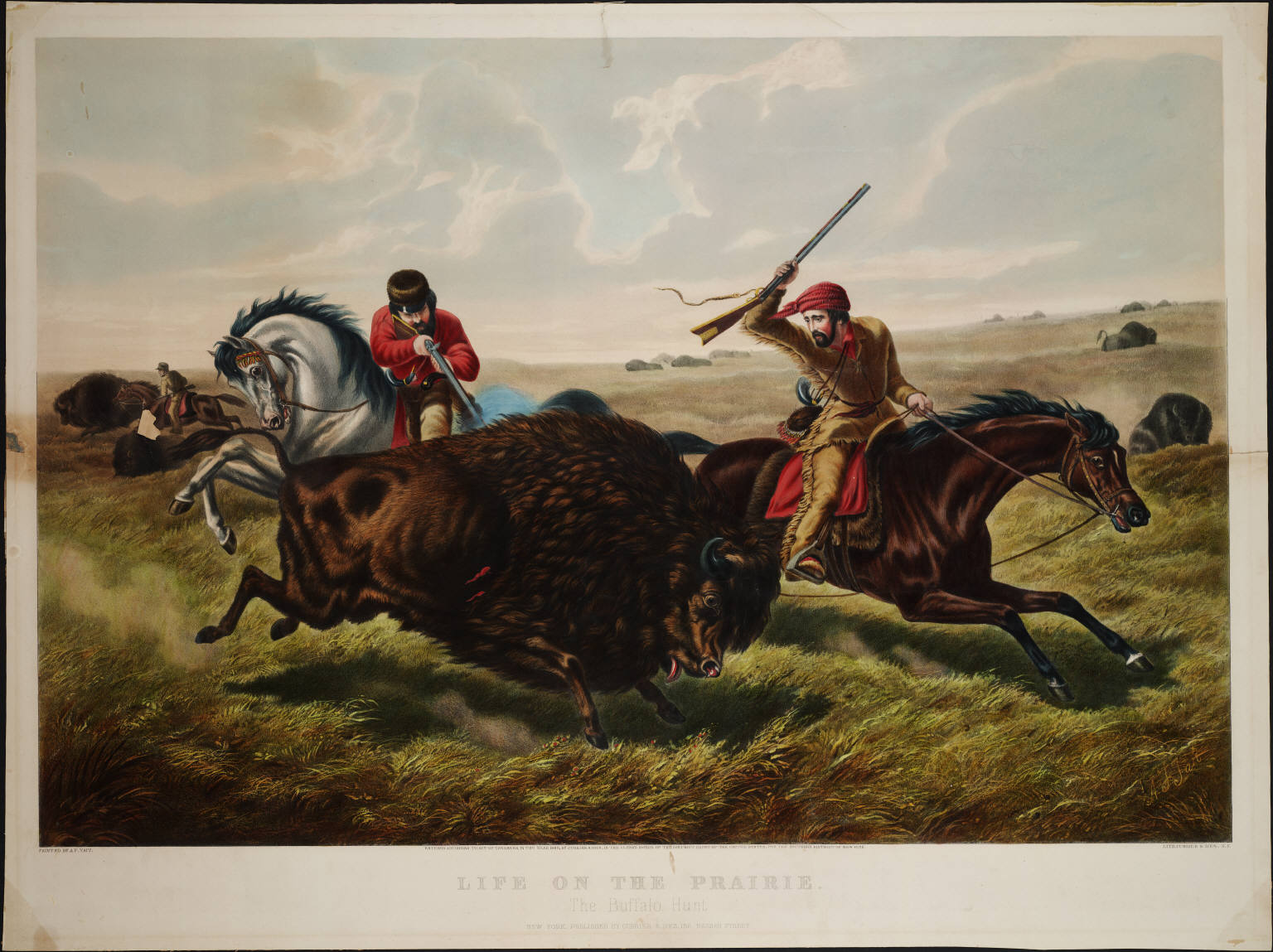
Life on the Prairie, The Buffalo Hunt, Arthur Fitzwilliam Tait, lithograph by Currier & Ives, 1862

During the period 1845-1848 he produced a number of lithographs of railway subjects, with a particular focus on landscapes showing the Lancashire and Yorkshire lines.

During the late 1840s he became aware of the Americas while attending a George Catlin exhibition in Paris. He immigrated to the United States in 1850, where he established a small painting camp in the Adirondacks to paint during summer. Starting in 1852, Currier & Ives reproduced lithographs of his works to publicize him. What also promoted his talent was exhibitions held at the National Academy of Design, New York during the late 19th century showing more than 200 paintings of his. In 1858 he was elected to full membership of the Academy.

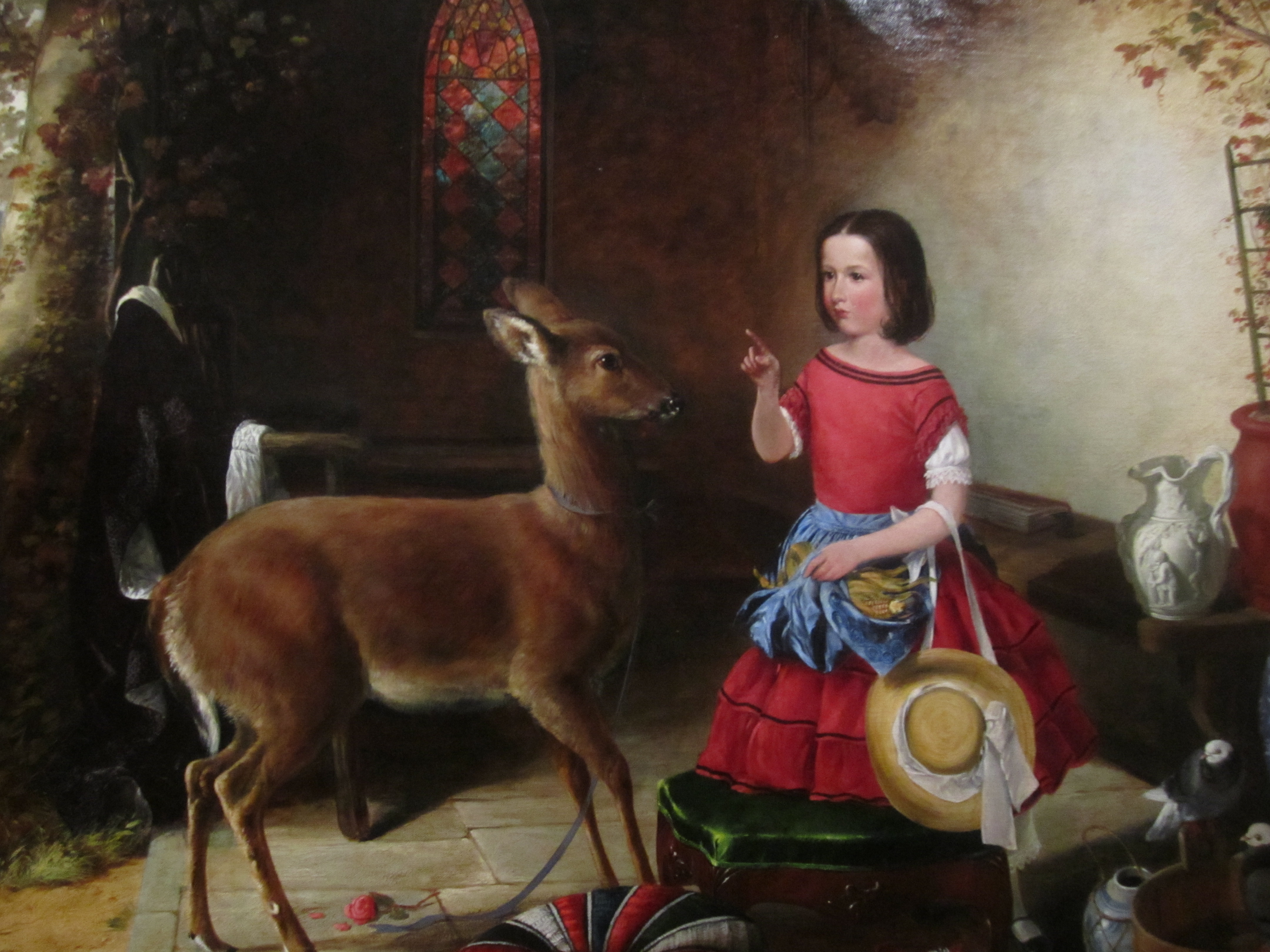
Tait's "The Reprimand" (1852), at the Brooklyn Museum in New York City shows a rural girl "warning" a deer.

He was identified with the art life of New York. He painted barnyard fowl and wild birds as well as sheep and deer, and reproductions of his minute panels of chickens had a vogue.

In 2006, Tait's painting Good Hunting Ground: The Home of the Deer was auctioned for $167,300.

He is interred at Woodlawn Cemetery in the Bronx, New York City.
