= Currier and Ives =

American printmaking firm

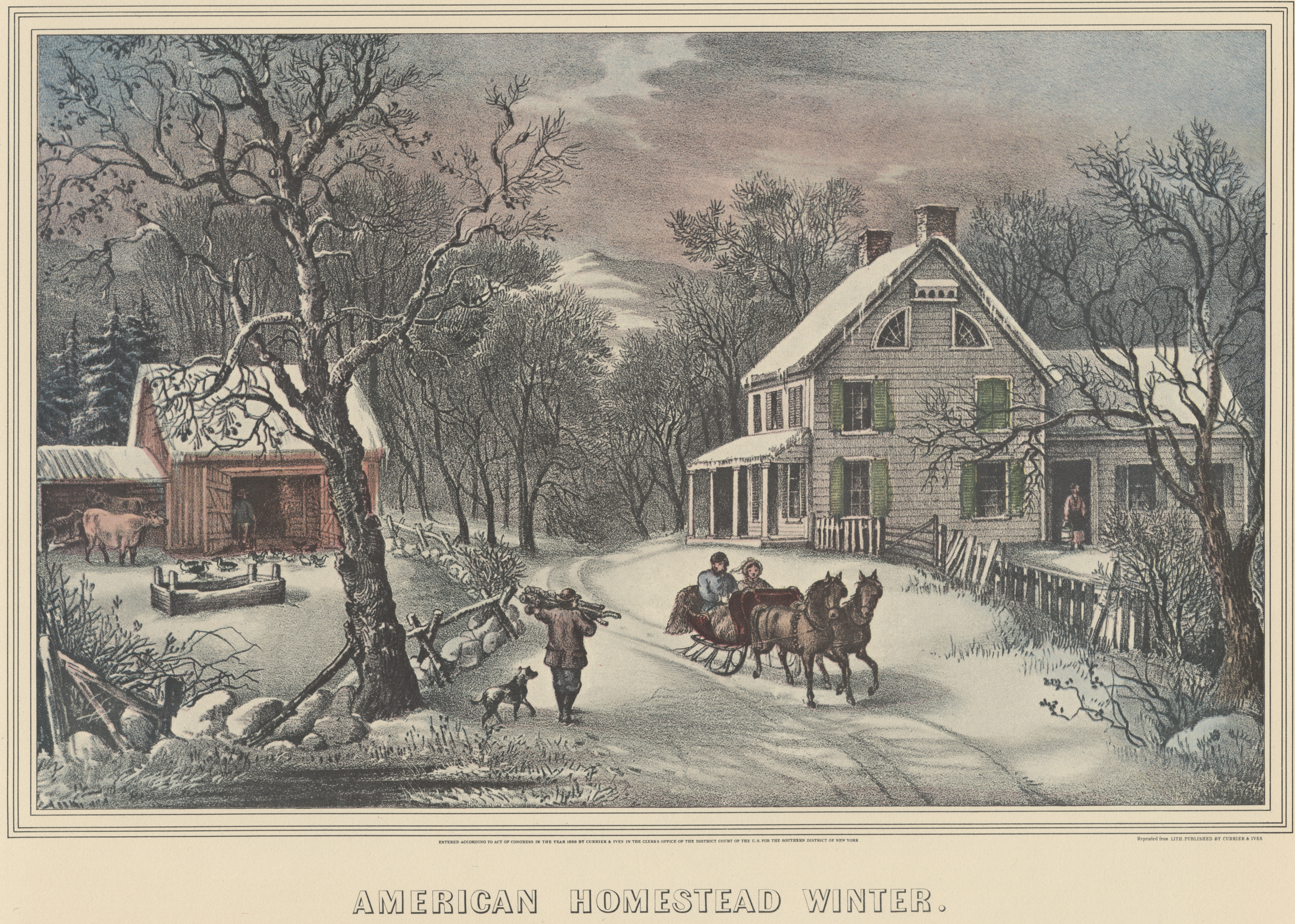
American Homestead Winter, published by Currier and Ives, 1868

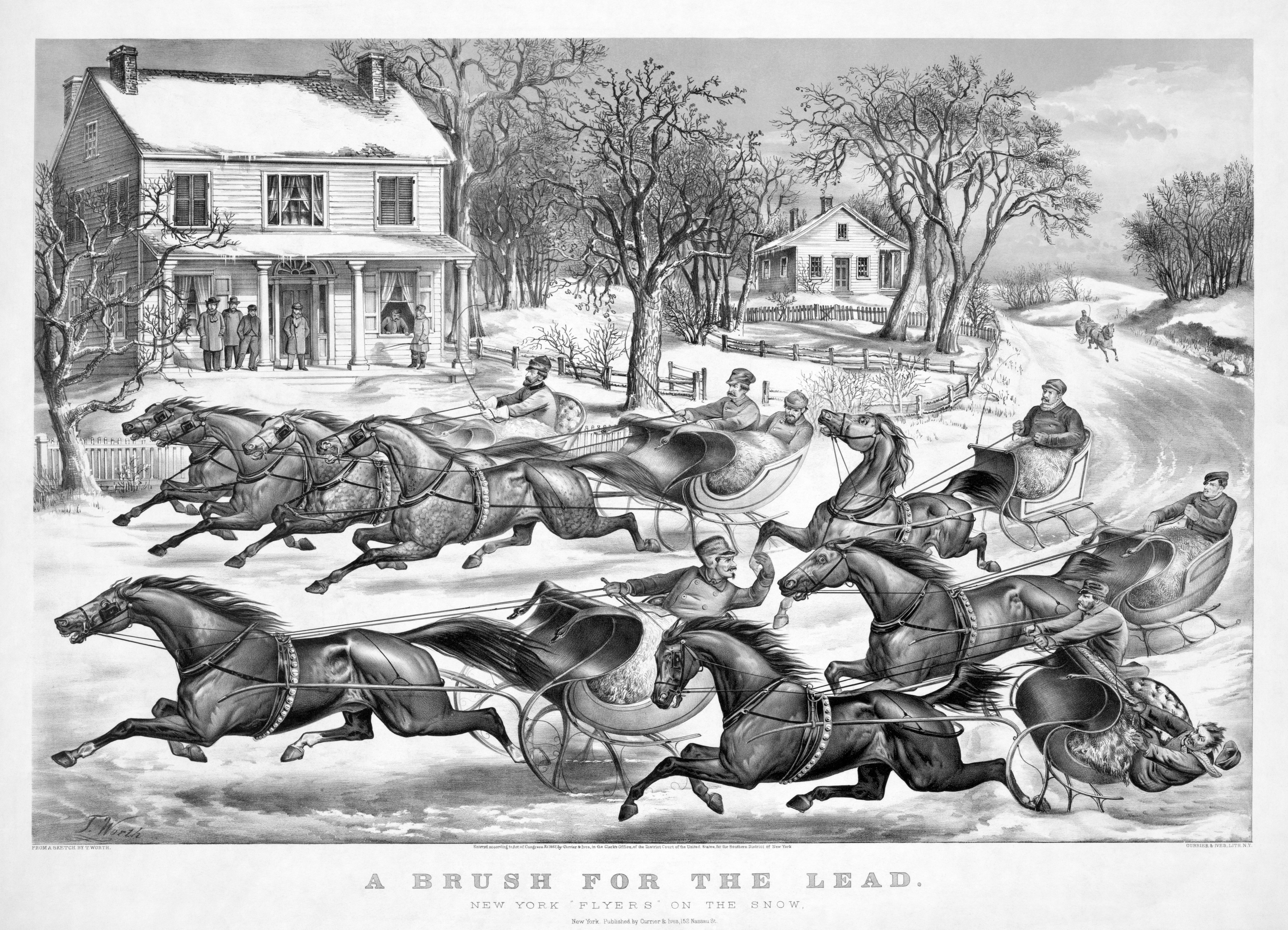
A Brush for the Lead, an 1867 lithograph by Currier and Ives

Currier and Ives was a New York City-based printmaking business operating from 1835 to 1907. Founded by Nathaniel Currier, the company designed and sold inexpensive hand-painted lithographic works based on news events, views of popular culture and Americana. Advertising itself as "the Grand Central Depot for Cheap and Popular Prints", the corporate name was changed in 1857 to "Currier and Ives" with the addition of James Merritt Ives.

The Darktown Comics lithographs were among the firm's best-selling works and depicted African Americans through racist caricatures.

== History ==
Nathaniel Currier (1813–88) was born in Roxbury, Massachusetts, on March 27, 1813, the second of four children. His parents Nathaniel and Hannah Currier were distant cousins who lived a humble and spartan life. Tragedy struck when Nathaniel was eight years old, when his father unexpectedly died, leaving Nathaniel and his eleven-year-old brother Lorenzo to provide for the family: six-year-old sister Elizabeth and two-year-old brother Charles, as well as their mother.

Nathaniel worked a series of odd jobs to support the family and, at fifteen, he started what became a lifelong career when he apprenticed in the Boston lithography shop of William and John Pendleton. In 1833 at age twenty, he moved to Philadelphia to do contract work for M.E.D. Brown, a noted engraver and printer. Currier's early lithographs were issued under the name of Stodart & Currier, a result of the partnership that he created in 1834 with a local New York printmaker named Stodart. The two men specialized in "job" printing and made a variety of print products, including music manuscripts. Currier became dissatisfied with the poor economic return of their business venture and ended the partnership in 1835. He set up shop alone, working as "N. Currier, Lithographer" until 1856.

In 1835, he created a lithograph that illustrated a fire sweeping through New York City's business district. The print of the Merchant's Exchange sold thousands of copies in four days. Currier realized that there was a market for current news, so he turned out several more disaster prints and other inexpensive lithographs that illustrated local and national events, such as "Ruins of the Planter's Hotel, New Orleans, which fell at two O'clock on the Morning of May 15, 1835, burying 50 persons, 40 of whom Escaped with their Lives". He quickly gained a reputation as an accomplished lithographer. In 1840, he produced "Awful Conflagration of the Steam Boat Lexington", which was so successful that he was given a weekly insert in the New York Sun. In that year, Currier's firm began to shift its focus from job printing to independent print publishing.

== Partnership with Ives ==
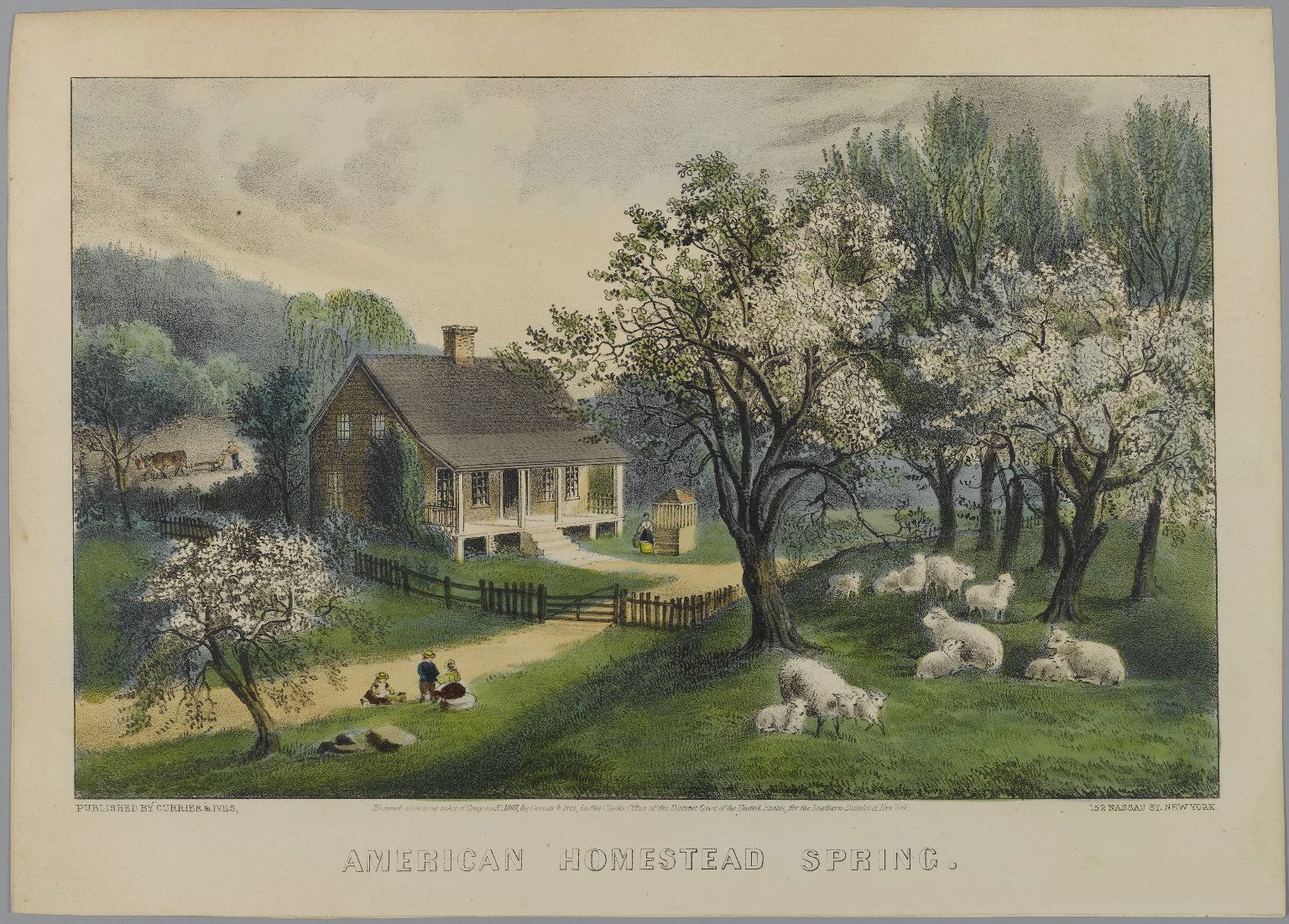
American Homestead Spring, a portrait by Currier and Ives now housed in the Brooklyn Museum

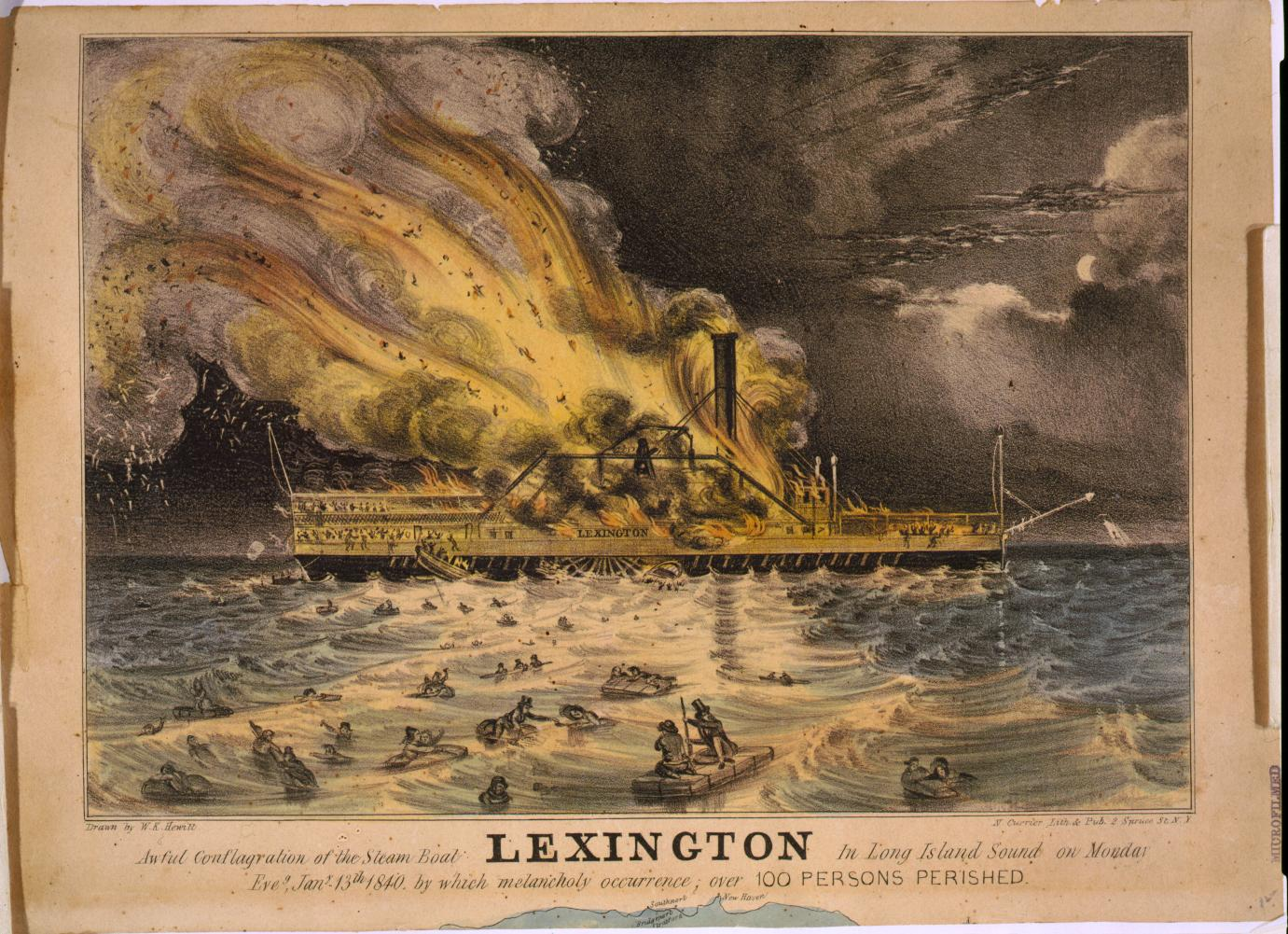
Awful Conflagration of the Steam Boat LEXINGTON in Long Island Sound on Monday Eve, an 1840 portrait

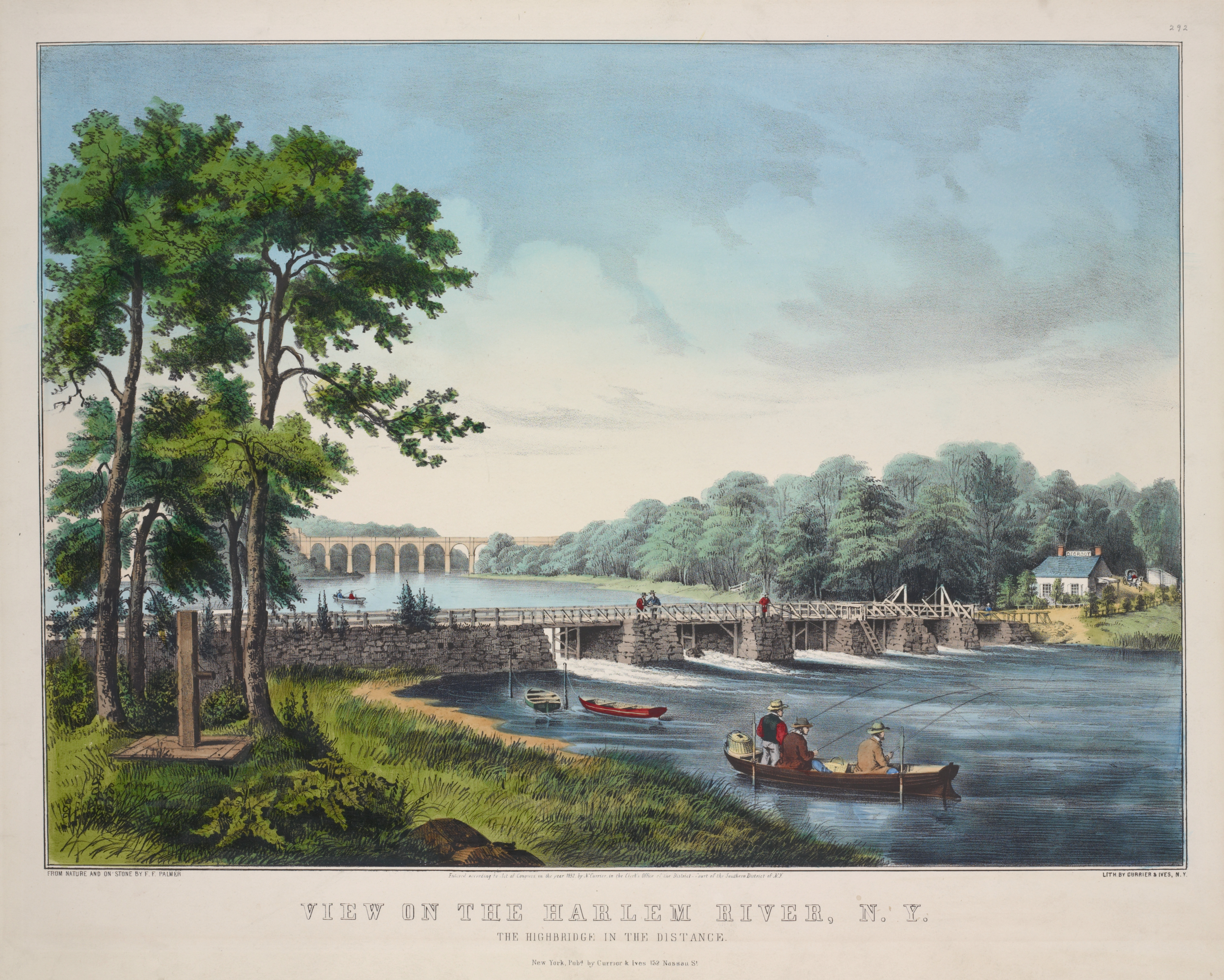
View on the Harlem River, N. Y., an 1852 portrait by Currier and Ives

The name Currier and Ives first appeared in 1857, when Currier invited the company's bookkeeper and accountant James Merritt Ives (1824–95) to become his partner. Ives was born on March 5, 1824, in New York City, and he married Caroline Clark in 1852. She was the sister-in-law of Nathaniel's brother Charles Currier, and it was Charles who recommended Ives to his brother. Nathaniel Currier soon noticed Ives's dedication to his business, and his artistic knowledge and insight into what the public wanted. The younger man quickly became the general manager of the firm, handling the financial side of the business by modernizing the bookkeeping, reorganizing inventory, and streamlining the print process. Ives also helped Currier interview potential artists and craftsmen. He had a flair for gauging popular interests and aided in selecting the images that the firm would publish and expanding the firm's range to include political satire and sentimental scenes, such as sleigh rides in the country and steamboat races. In 1857, Currier made Ives a full partner.

== The firm ==
The firm Currier and Ives described itself as "Publishers of Cheap and Popular Prints". At least 7,500 lithographs were published in the firm's 72 years of operation. Artists produced two to three new images every week for 64 years (1834–1895), producing more than a million prints by hand-colored lithography. For the original drawings, Currier and Ives employed or used the work of many celebrated artists of the day, including James E. Buttersworth, George Inness, Thomas Nast, Eastman Johnson, and others. The stars of the firm were Arthur Fitzwilliam Tait, who specialized in sporting scenes; Louis Maurer, who executed genre scenes; George H. Durrie, who supplied winter scenes; and Frances Flora Bond Palmer, who liked to do picturesque panoramas of the American landscape, and who was the first woman in the United States to make her living as a full-time artist.

All lithographs were produced on lithographic limestone printing plates on which the drawing was done by hand. A stone often took over a week to prepare for printing. Each print was pulled by hand. Prints were hand-colored by a dozen or more women, often immigrants from Germany with an art background. They worked in assembly-line fashion, one color to a worker, and were paid $6 for every 100 colored prints. The favored colors were clear and simple, and the drawing was bold and direct.

The earliest lithographs were printed in black and then colored by hand. As new techniques were developed, publishers began to produce full-color lithographs that gradually developed softer, more painterly effects. Skilled artist lithographers such as John Cameron, Fanny Palmer, and others became known for their work and signed important pieces. Artists such as A. F. Tait became famous when their paintings were reproduced as lithographs.

Currier and Ives was the most prolific and successful company of lithographers in the U.S. Its lithographs represented every phase of American life, and included the themes of hunting, fishing, whaling, city life, rural scenes, historical scenes, clipper ships, yachts, steamships, the Mississippi River, Hudson River scenes, railroads, politics, comedy, gold mining, winter scenes, commentary on life, portraits, and still lifes. From 1866 on, the firm occupied three floors in a building at 33 Spruce Street in New York:

- Hand-operated printing presses occupied the third floor.
- Artists, stone grinders, and lithographers worked on the fourth floor.
- Colorists worked on the fifth floor.

Small works sold for five to twenty cents each, and large works sold for $1 to $3 apiece. The Currier and Ives firm branched out from its central shop in New York City to sell prints via pushcart vendors, peddlers, and book stores. The firm sold retail as well as wholesale, establishing outlets in cities across the country and in London. It also sold work through the mail (prepaid orders only), and internationally through a London office and agents in Europe.

The 19th-century Victorian public was receptive to the firm's products, with its interest in current events and sentimental taste. Currier and Ives prints were among the most popular wall hangings of the day. In 1872, the Currier and Ives catalog proudly proclaimed: "our Prints have become a staple article... in great demand in every part of the country... In fact without exception, all that we have published have met with a quick and ready sale."

Currier and Ives prints were among the household decorations considered appropriate for a proper home by Catharine Esther Beecher and Harriet Beecher Stowe, authors of American Woman's Home (1869): "The great value of pictures for the home would be, after all, in their sentiment. They should express the sincere ideas and tastes of the household and not the tyrannical dicta of some art critic or neighbor."

Currier died in 1888. Ives remained active in the firm until his death in 1895. Both Currier's and Ives's sons followed their fathers in the business, which was eventually liquidated in 1907. The public demand for lithographs had gradually diminished because of improvements in offset printing and photoengraving.

Currier and Ives is mentioned in the popular Christmas carol "Sleigh Ride".

== The lithographs ==
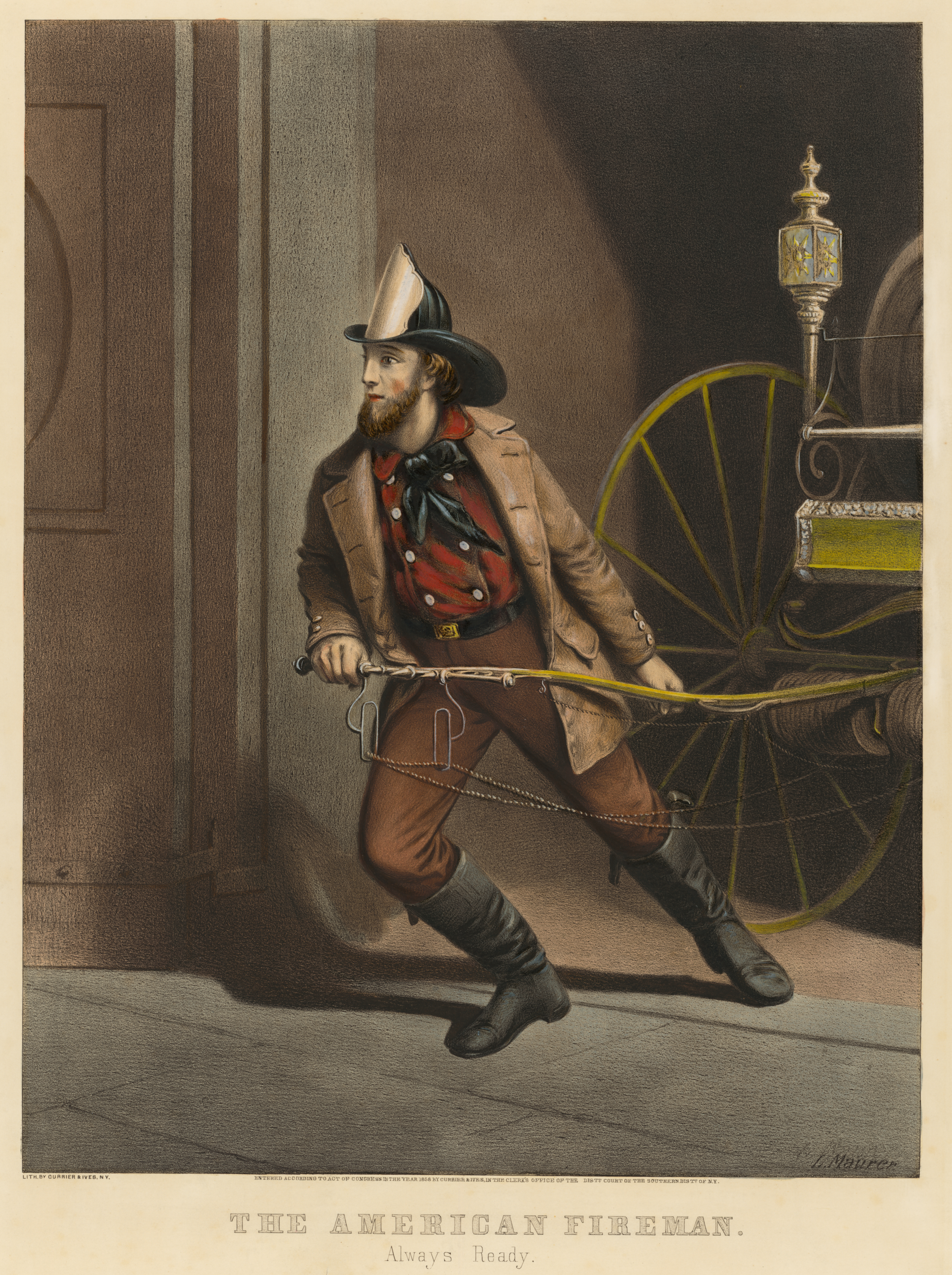
The American Fireman, an 1858 lithograph by Louis Maurer for Currier and Ives

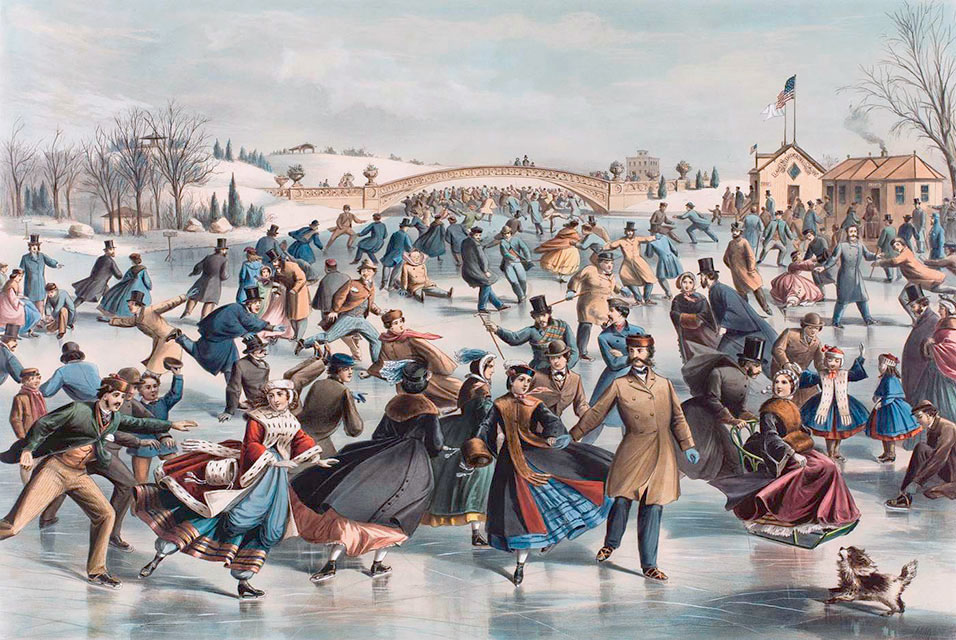
Central-Park Winter. The skating pond, a lithograph by Currier and Ives, 1862

The prints depicted a variety of images of American life, including winter scenes, horse-racing images, portraits of people, and pictures of ships, sporting events, patriotic, and historical events, including ferocious battles of the American Civil War, the building of cities and railroads, and Lincoln's assassination. Currier and Ives also produced many prints that were inherently racist in nature, particularly in a series of prints called the Darktown Comics. They depicted African Americans in very demeaning ways, making a very clear mockery of them to their white counterparts. These types of images were popular in the 19th century and in high demand. Many of these images are still readily available to view and purchase.

The original lithographs shared similar characteristics in inking and paper, and adhered to folio sizes. Sizes of the images were standard (trade cards, very small folios, small folios, medium folios, large folios), and their measurement did not include the title or borders. These sizes are one of the guides for collectors today in determining if the print is an original or not. "Currier used a cotton based, medium to heavy weight paper depending on the folio size for his prints until the late 1860s. From about 1870, Currier and Ives used paper mixed with a small amount of wood pulp." In addition, Currier's inking process resembled a mixture of elongated splotches and dashes of ink with a few spots, a characteristic that modern reproductions would not possess.

In 1907, the firm was liquidated and most of the lithographic stones had the image removed and were sold by the pound, with some stones' final home being as land fill in Central Park. Those few stones that managed to survive intact were of large folio Clipper Ships, small folio Dark Town Comics, a medium folio "Abraham Lincoln" and a small folio "Washington As A Mason".

- Currier and Ives Civil War lithographs
- Known railroad related lithographs of Currier and Ives
- Currier and Ives: Perspectives on America, American Public Television, Video
- High Water in the Mississippi, 1868
- Currier and Ives Darktown Comic Series, Albion College

Today, original Currier and Ives prints are much sought by collectors, and modern reproductions of them are popular decorations. Especially popular are the winter scenes, which are commonly used for American Christmas cards. In 2019 a print of Across the Continent by Fanny Palmer sold at auction for over US$60,000.

=== Racist lithographs ===
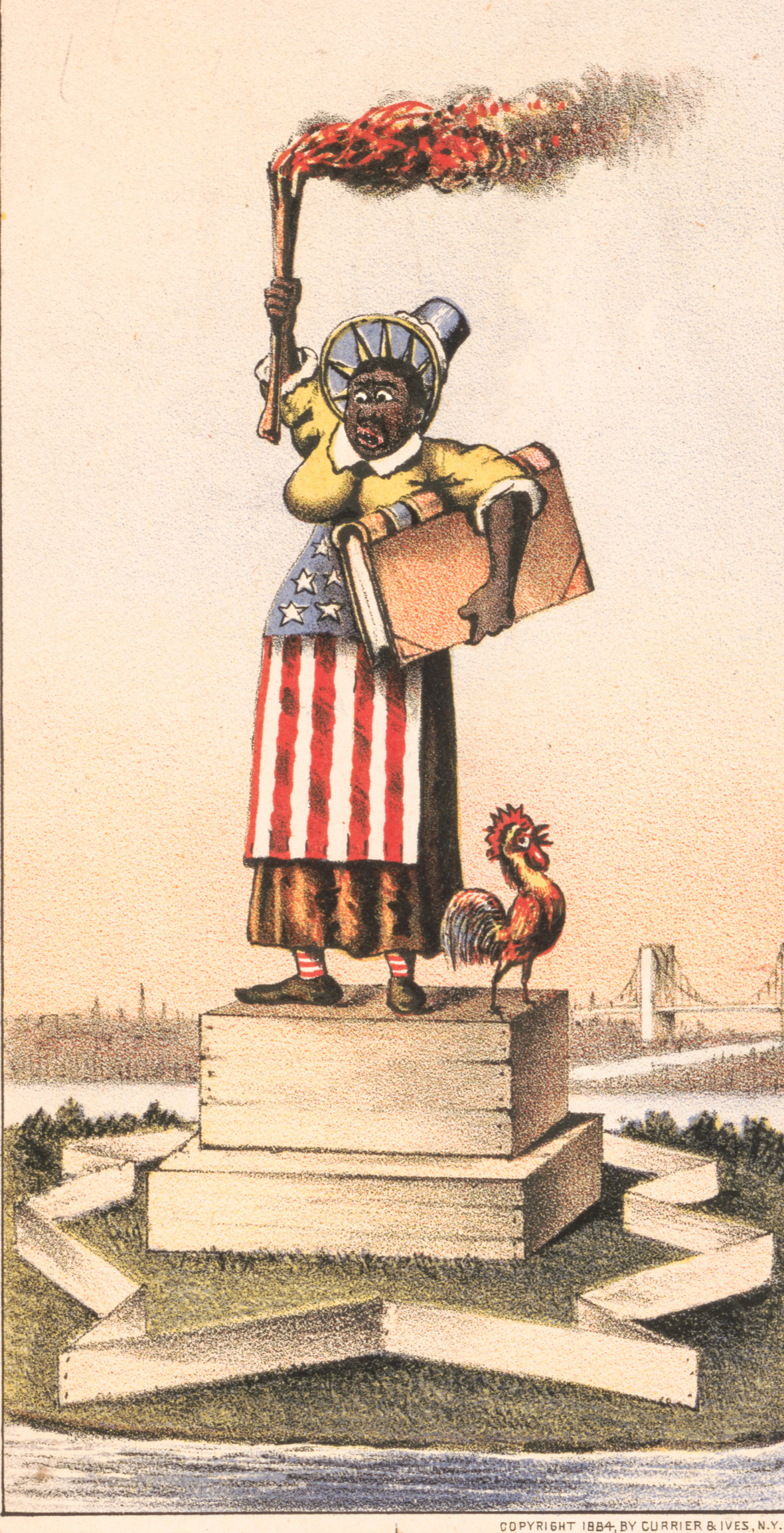
Statue of Liberty lithograph

Currier and Ives, because they were targeting a middle-class American customer, inadvertently created a "pictorial record" of values in the United States in the 19th century, which included contemporary racism. According to Albert Baragwanath, of the approximately 500 "comic prints" produced by Currier and Ives, "more than half of these were the so-called Darktown Comics whose humor lay in gross burlesque."

The Darktown Comics series was perennially among the bestselling of Currier and Ives' over 7000 lithographs, with at least one selling 73,000 copies via pushcarts and in shops and country stores. According to J. Michael Martinez, every one of the series was a bestseller.

Thomas Worth recreated a previous Statue of Liberty image, using an African American woman similar to the mammy figure holding a torch as part of their Darktown Comics series.

== Gallery of images ==
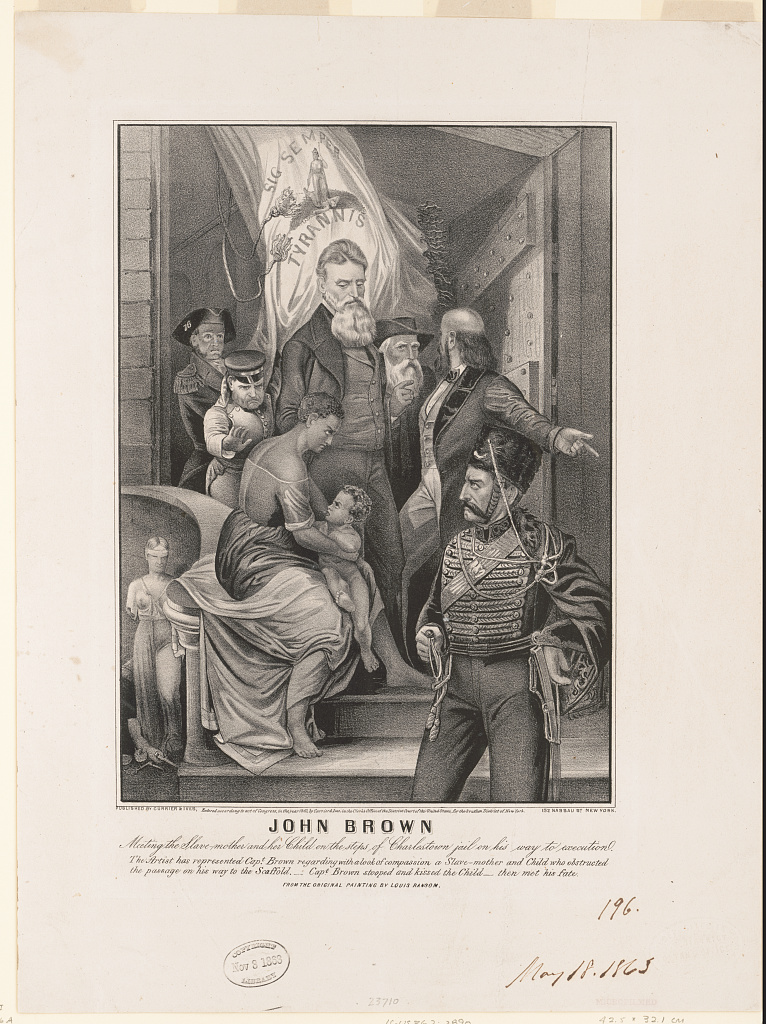
John Brown as Christ, en route to his execution, 1859. Above his head, the flag of Virginia and its motto, Sic semper tyrannis ("Thus always to tyrants"). From a now-lost original by Louis Ransom.

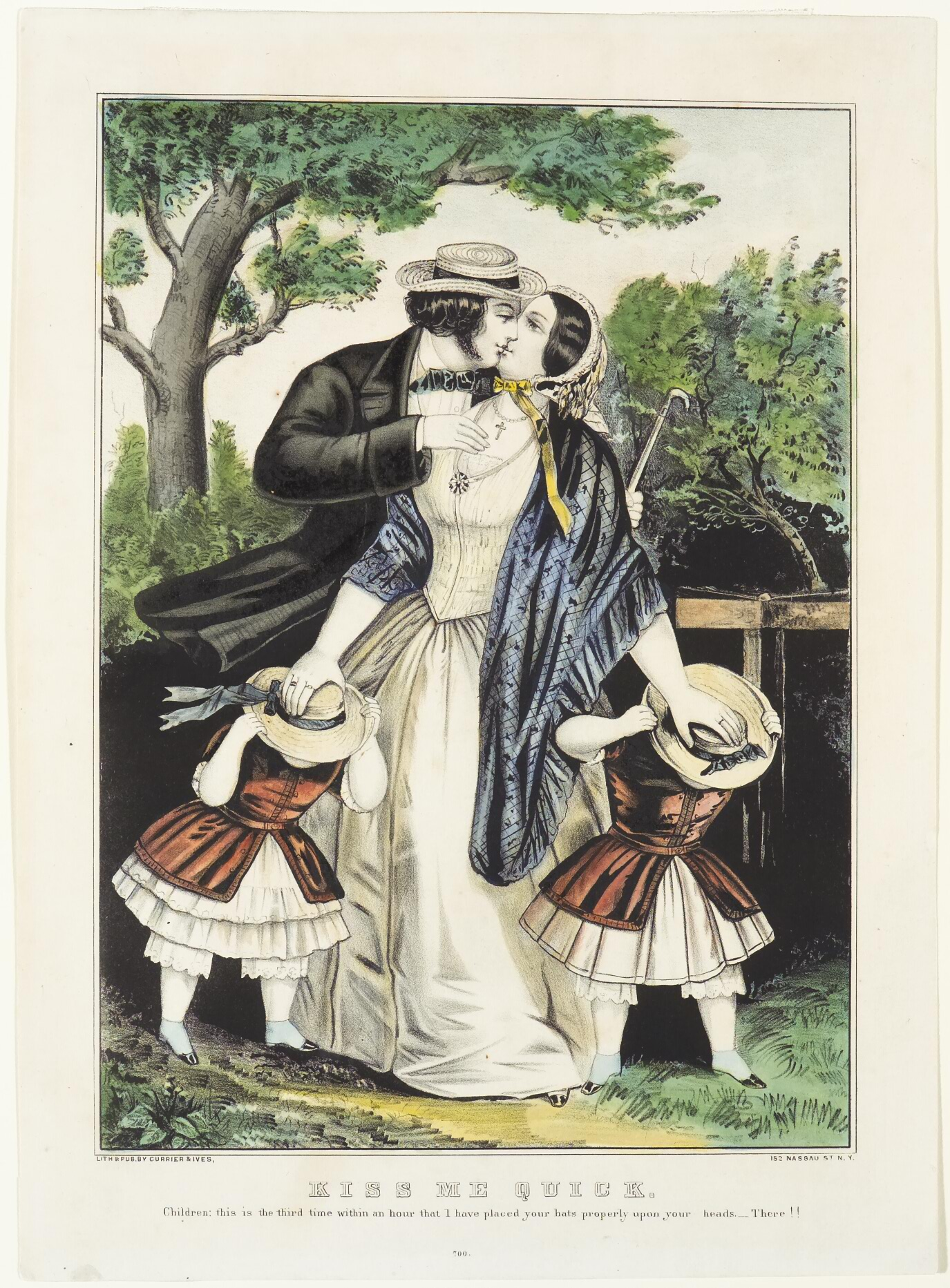
Kiss Me Quick, 1840s

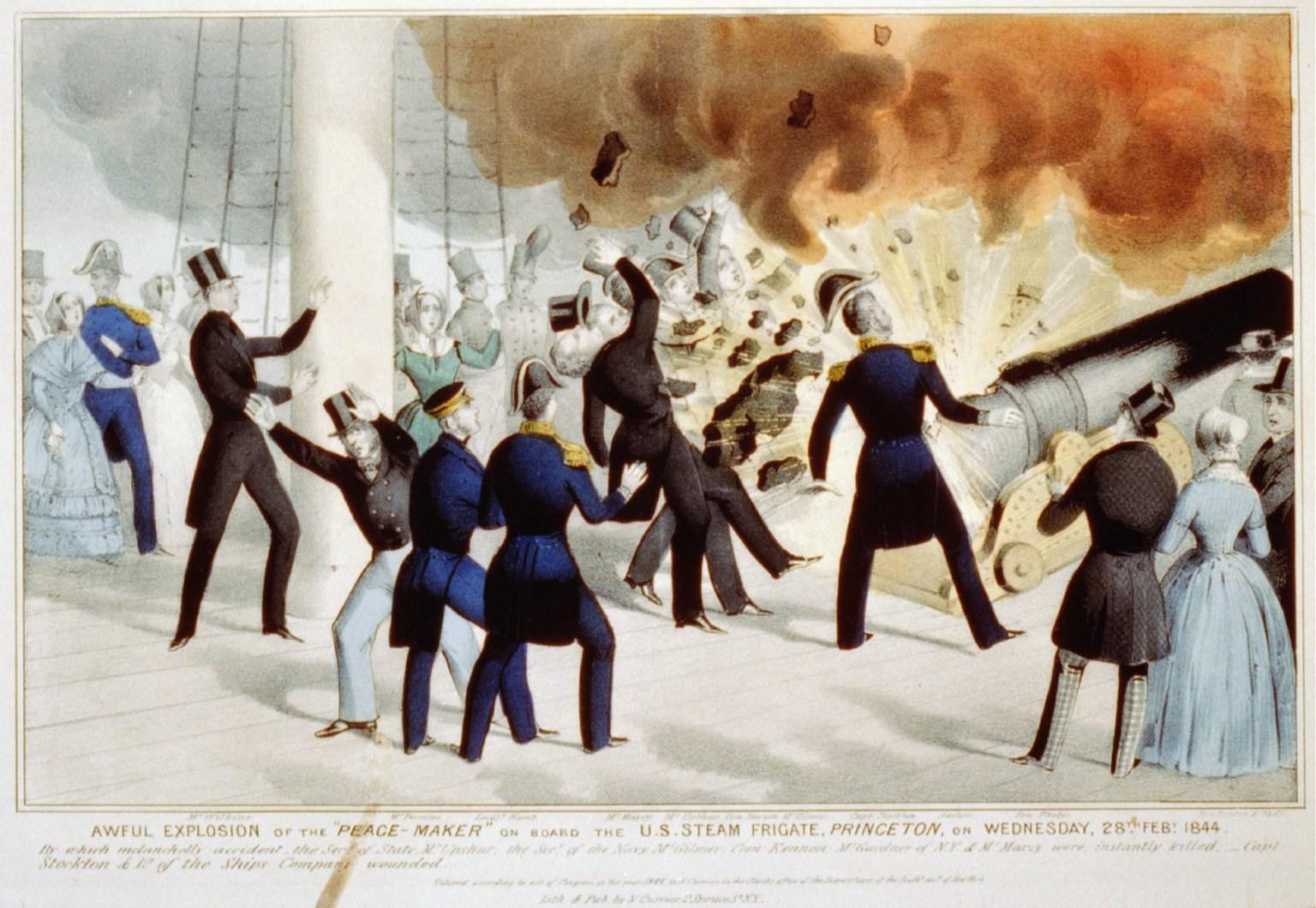
Explosion Aboard the USS Princeton, 1844

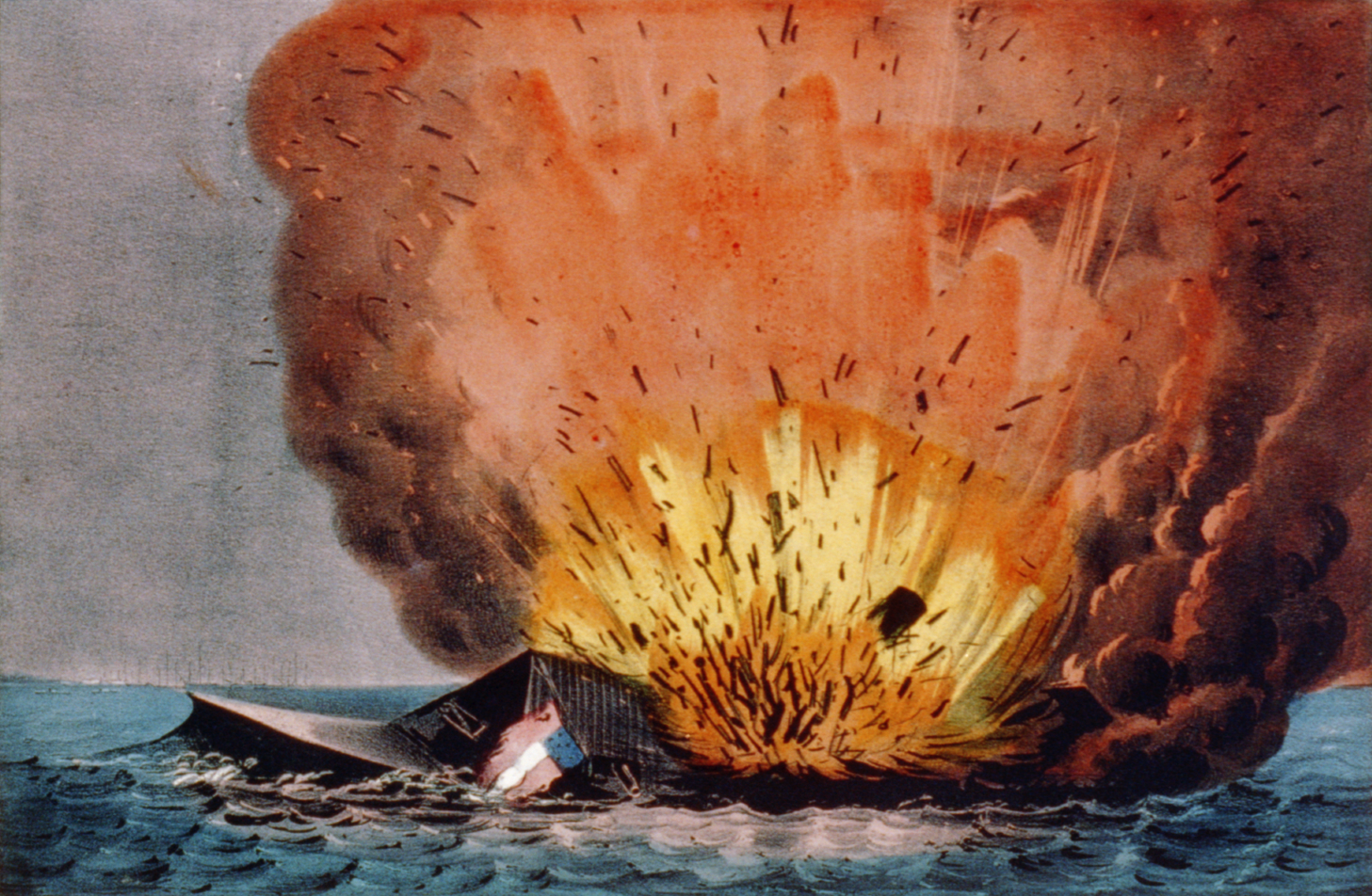
Destruction of the Rebel Monster "Merrimac" off Craney Island, May 11th 1862

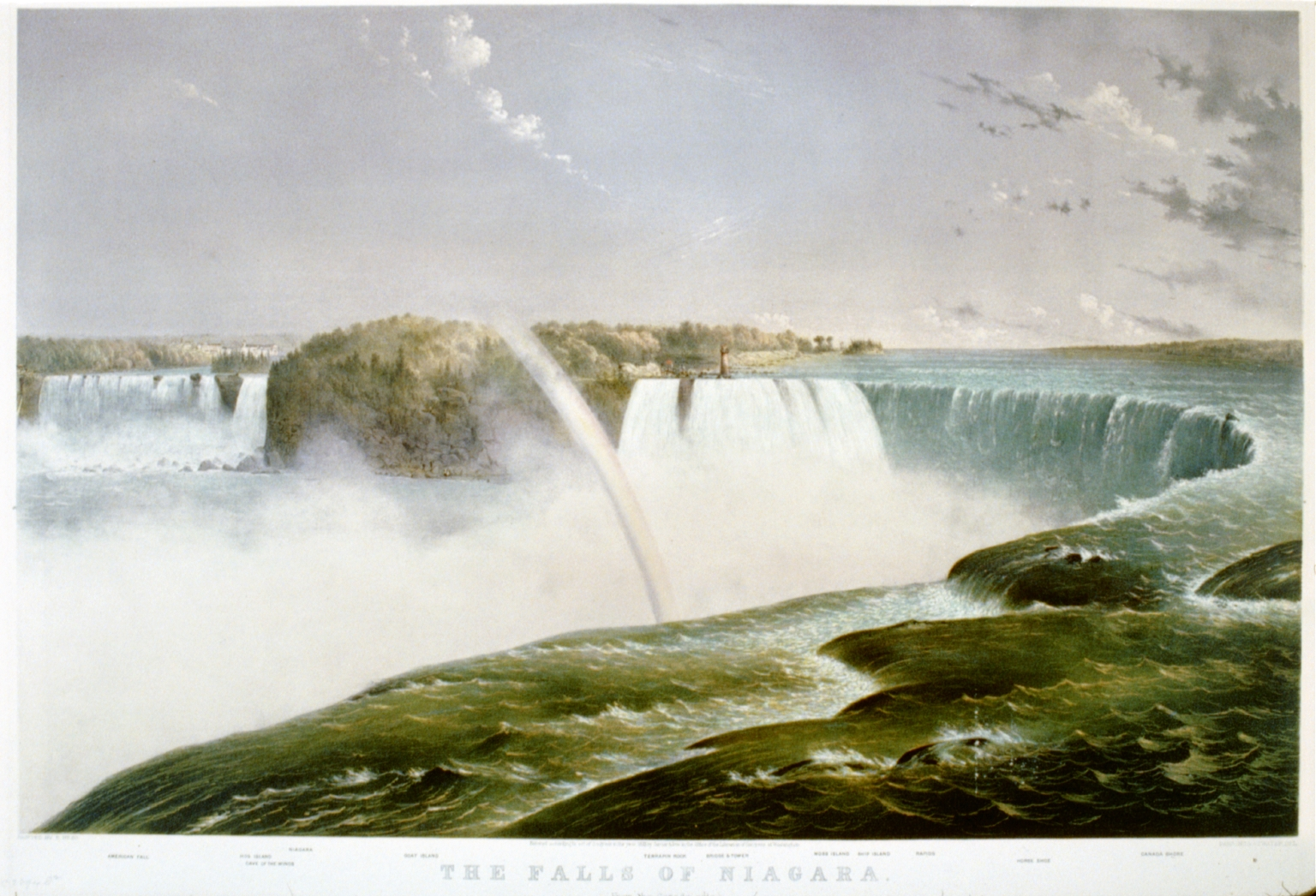
The Falls of Niagara—From the Canada Side, 1868

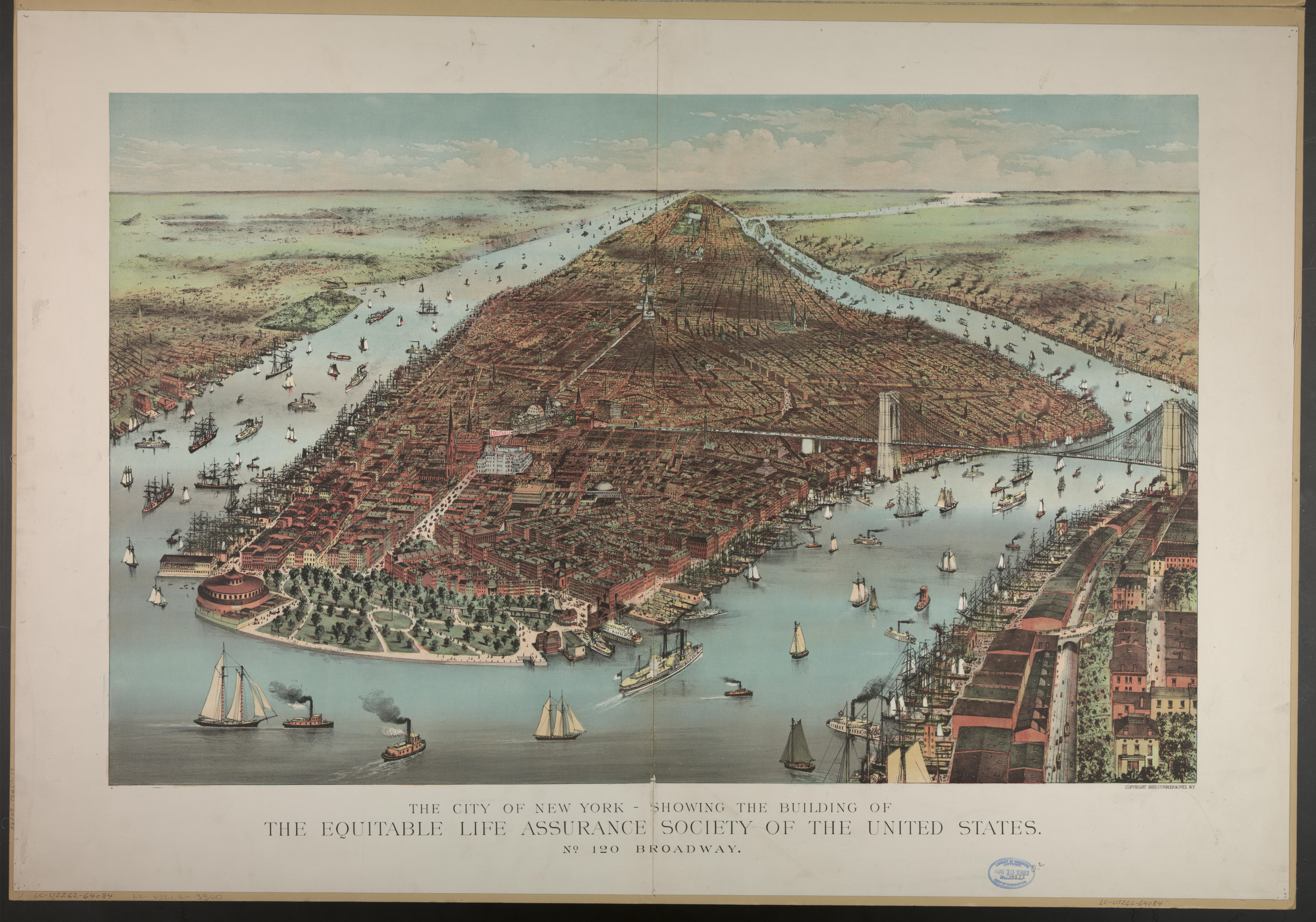
City of New York—Showing the building of the Equitable Life Assurance Society of the United States. No. 120 Broadway, 1883

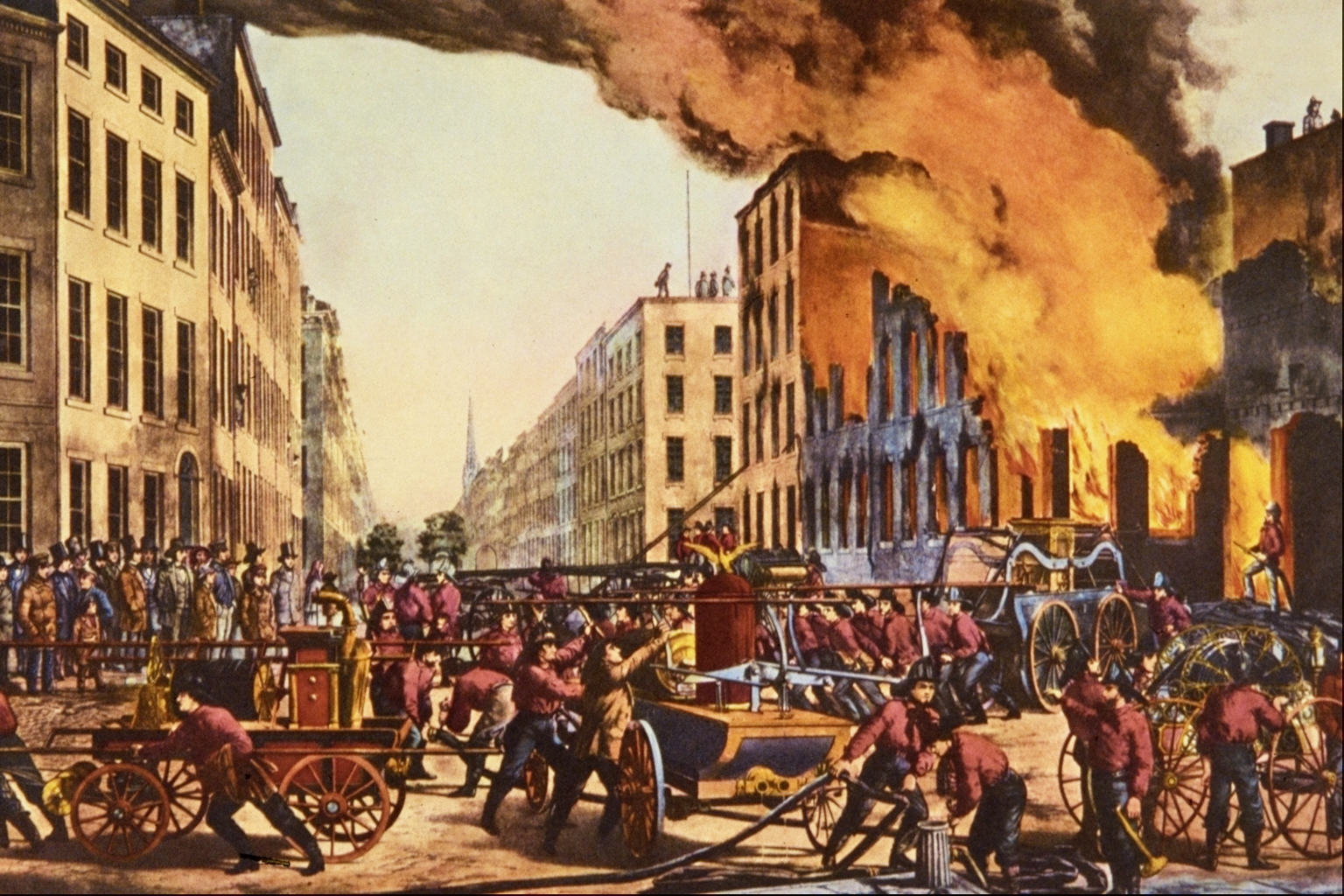
The Life of a Fireman, lithograph by Louis Maurer for Currier and Ives

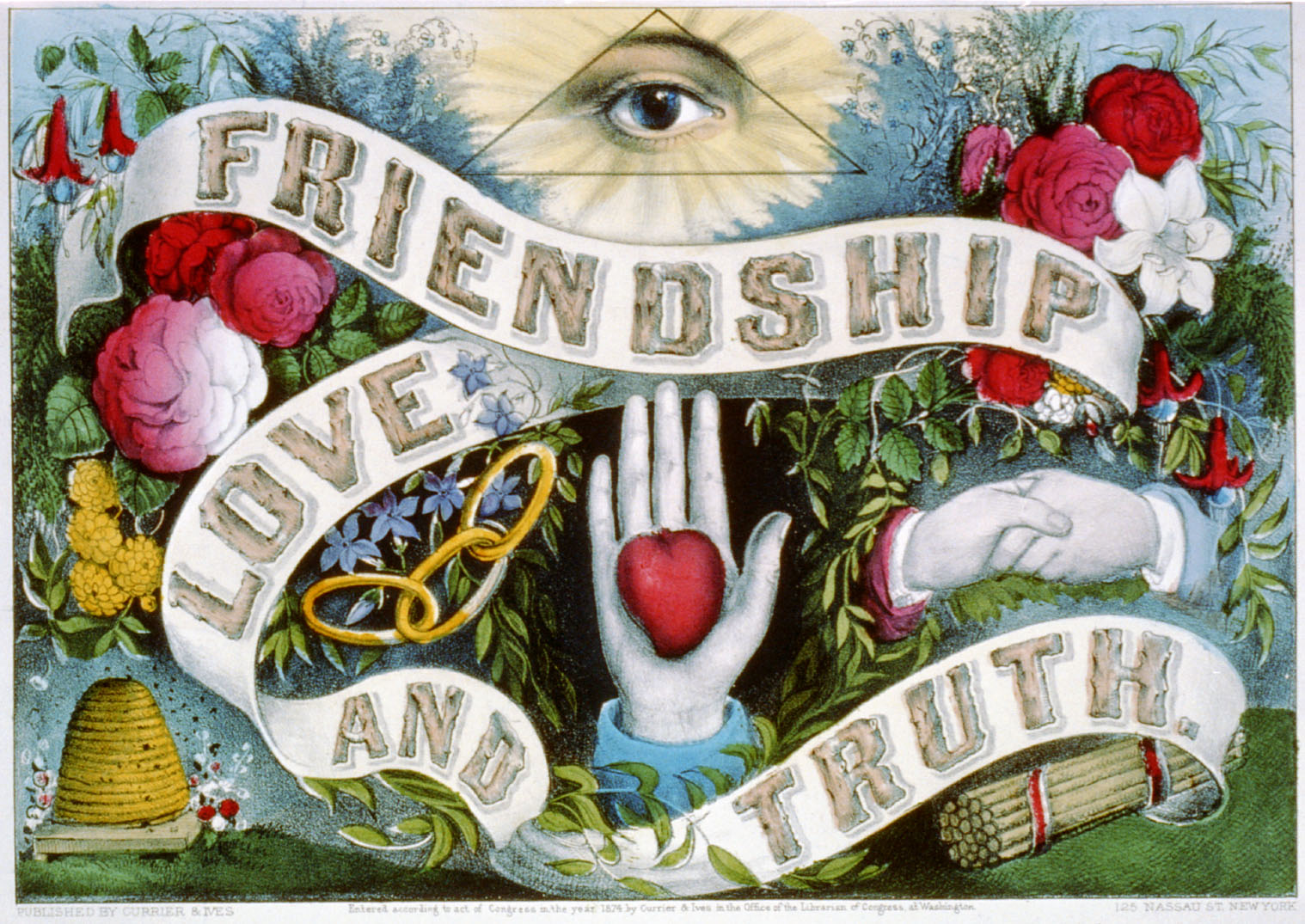
Friendship love and truth

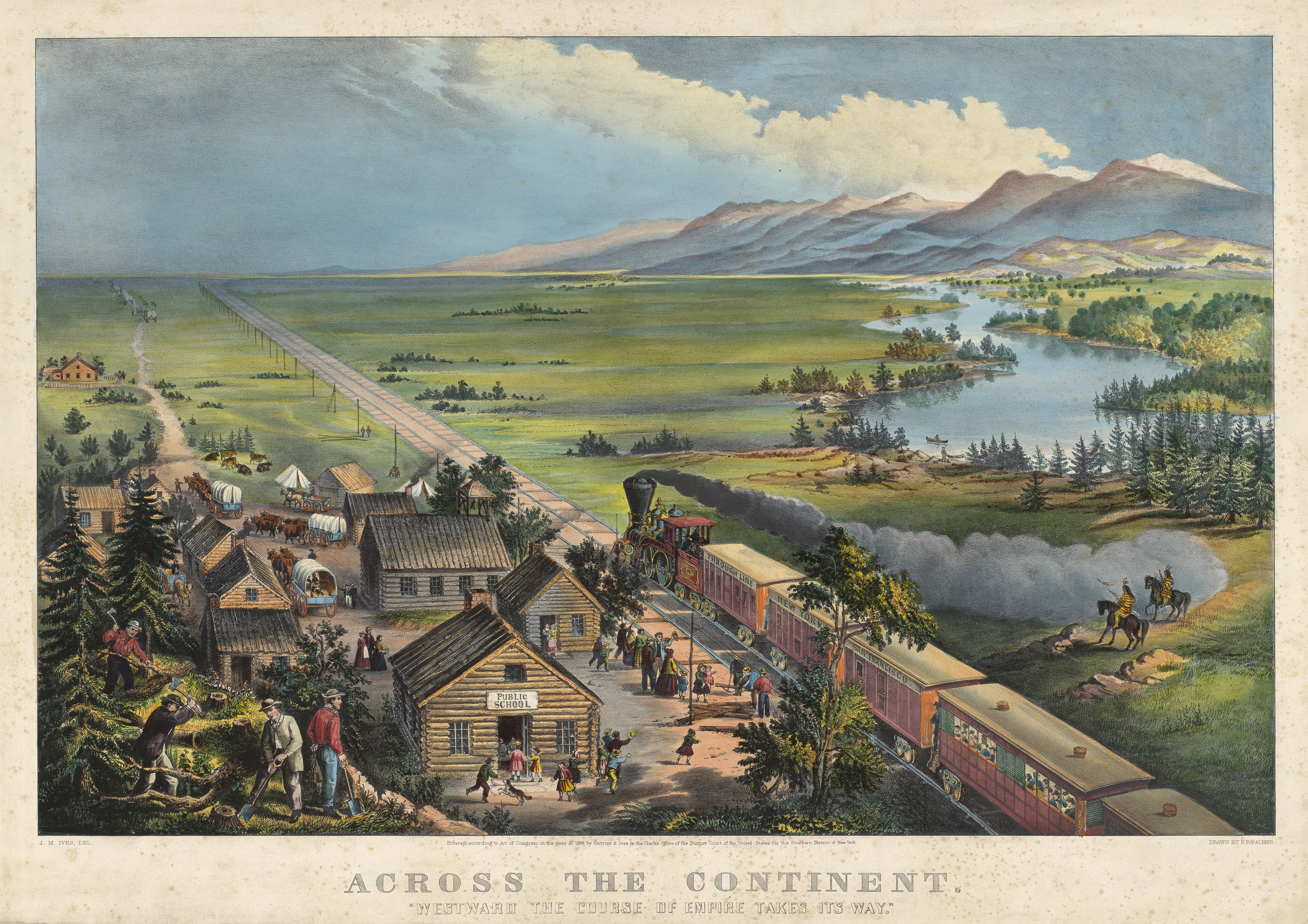
Across the Continent: Westward the Course of Empire Takes its Way by Fanny Palmer (1868)
