= Louis Maurer =

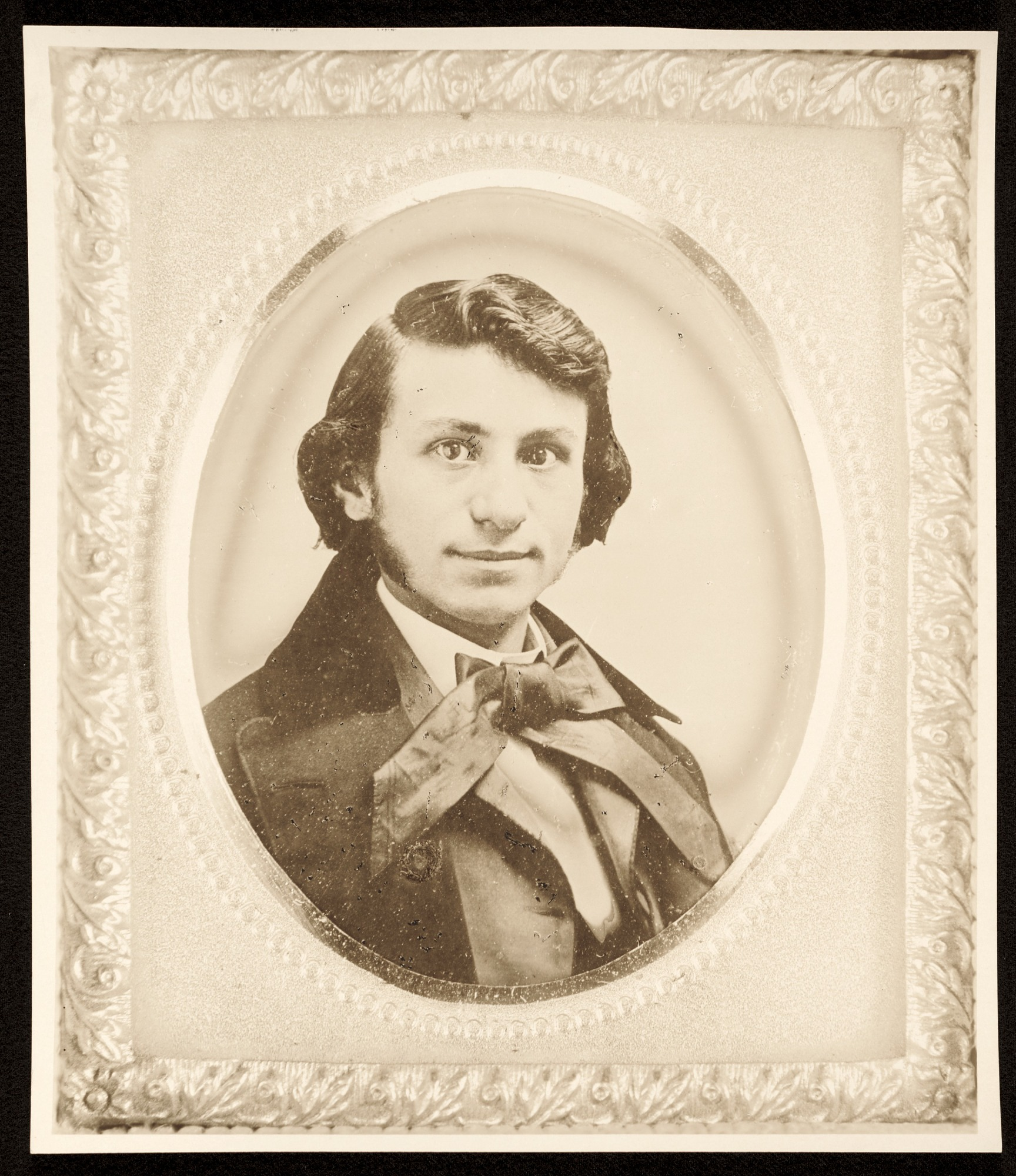
Louis Maurer (before 1900)

Louis Maurer (February 21, 1832 – July 19, 1932) was a German-born American lithographer, and the father of the American painter Alfred Henry Maurer. He was the last surviving artist known to have been employed by Currier and Ives. Prior to his death, Maurer was extensively interviewed about the firm by collector and connoisseur Harry T. Peters for his book Currier & Ives, Printmakers to the American People.

Maurer was born in Biebrich, Germany, and studied anatomy, mechanical drawing, and lithography in Mainz before immigrating to the United States in 1851. He began working as a lithographer at the firm of T.W. Strong in 1852. Later that same year he joined Currier and Ives, working there until 1860. His series, The Life of a Fireman (1854), was a popular lithography series produced for Currier and Ives. (These prints inspired sculptor John A. Wilson's Firemen's Memorial.)

During the American Civil War, Maurer worked as a shooting instructor in Palisades Park. He was later a partner in the lithography firm of Heppenheimer & Maurer until his retirement in 1884. He began to study art in an academic setting at the age of fifty, first at the Gotham Art Academy and later at the National Academy under William Merritt Chase. Maurer's archives are located at the American Antiquarian Society.

Gallery

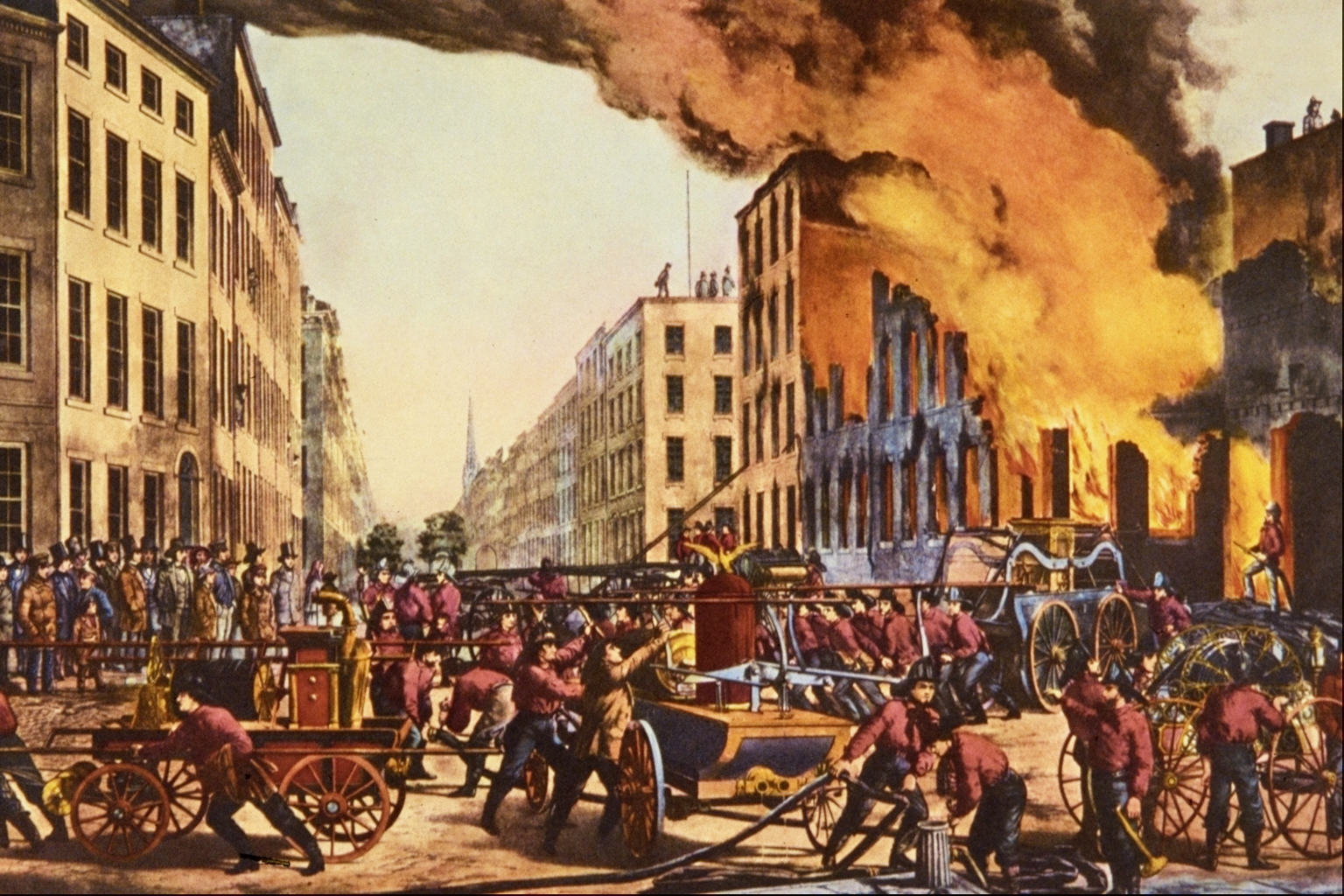
The Life of a Fireman, lithograph for Currier and Ives, 1854

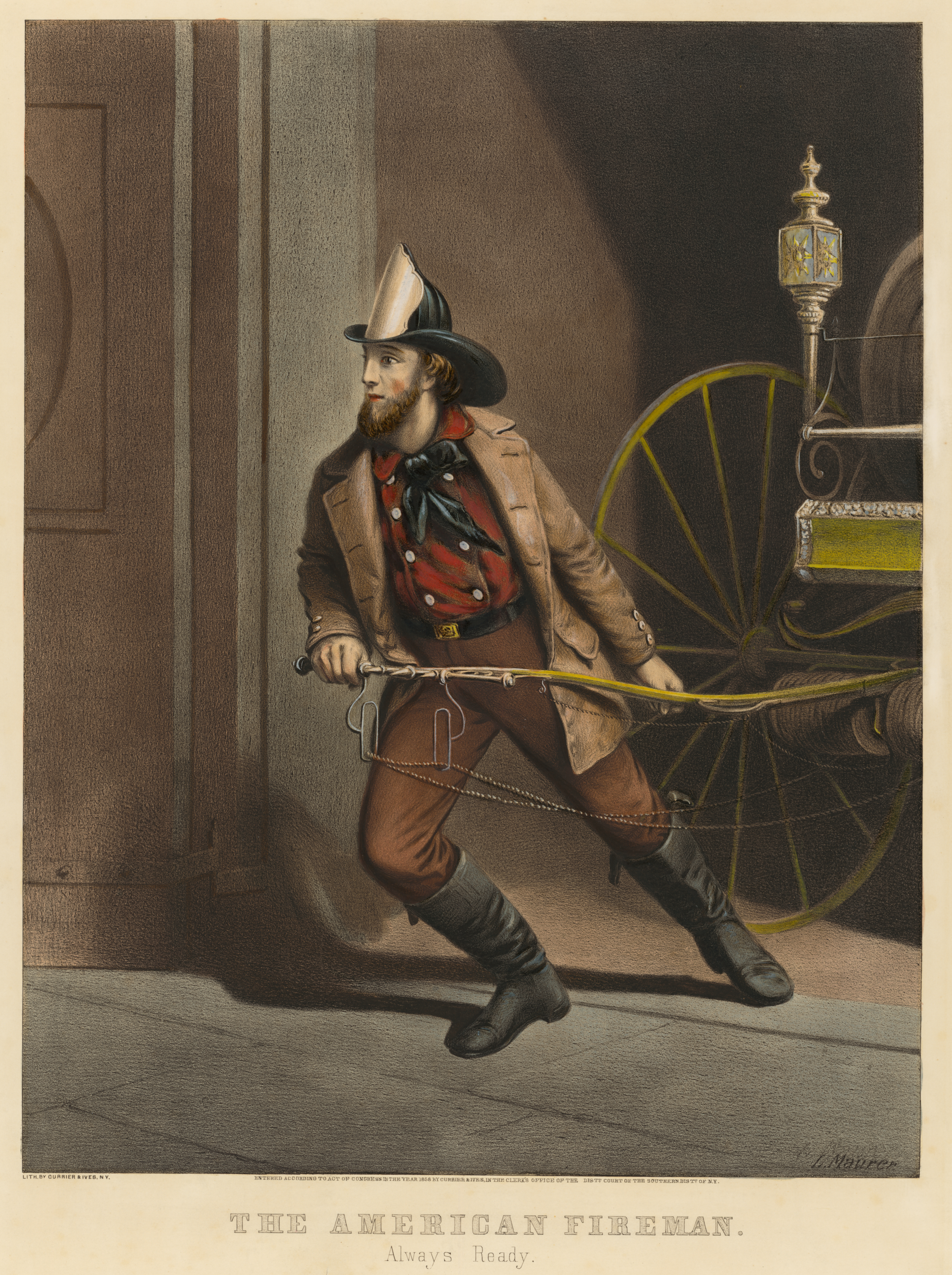
The American Fireman - Always Ready, 1858

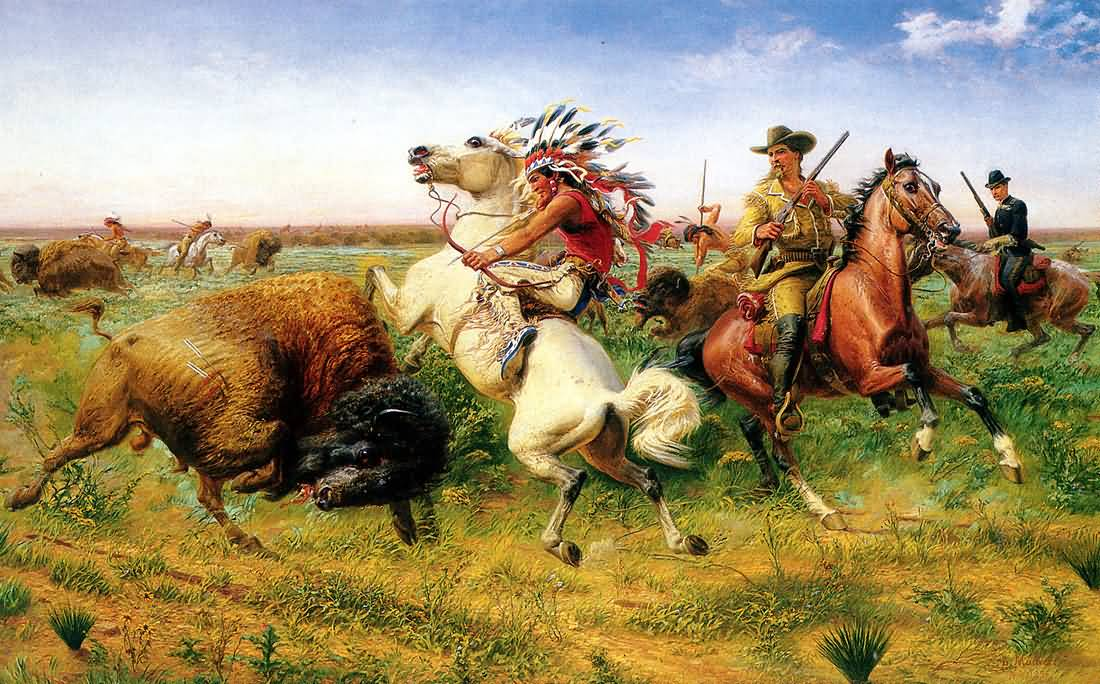
The Great Royal Buffalo Hunt, 1895

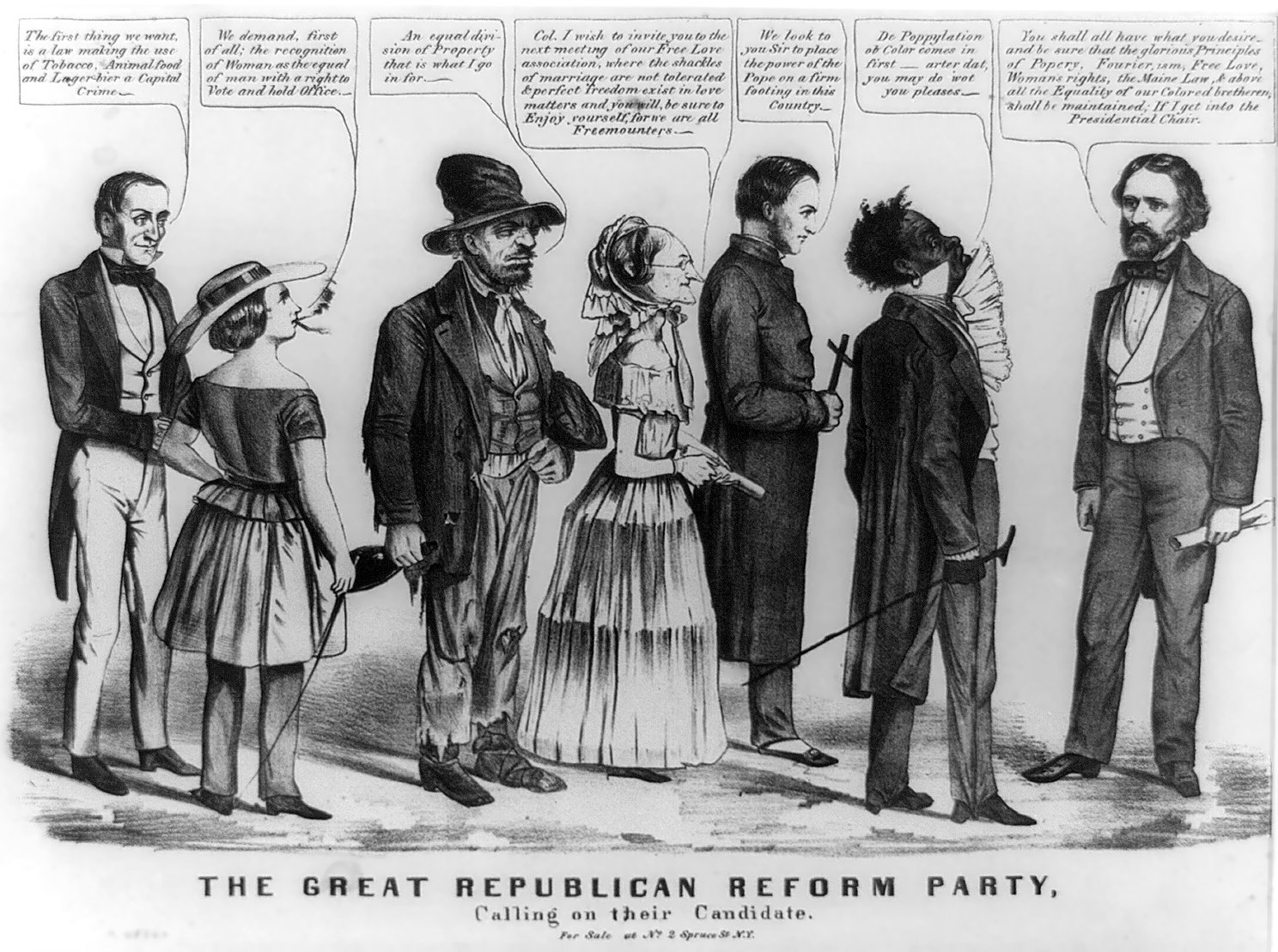
Republican party Fremontisms caricature, 1856
