= James Merritt Ives =

American lithographer

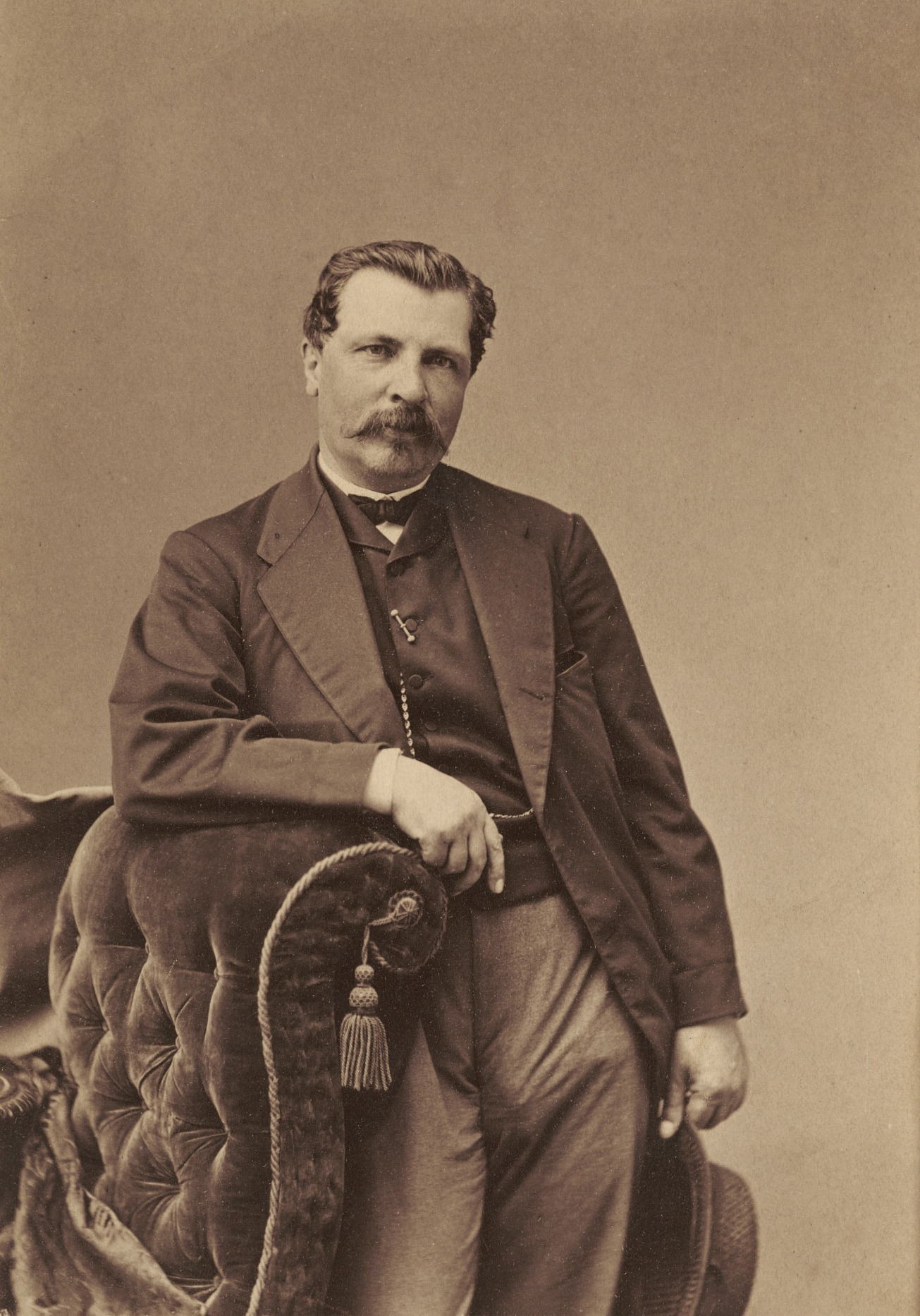
- Ives, photographed by Napoleon Sarony
- Born: March 5, 1824; New York City, New York, U.S.
- Died: January 3, 1895 (aged 70); Rye, New York, U.S.
- Occupation(s): Lithographer and businessman

James Merritt Ives (March 5, 1824 – January 3, 1895) was an American lithographer, bookkeeper, and businessman. He oversaw the business and financial side of the firm, Currier and Ives, which he co-managed with his business partner, Nathaniel Currier.

== Biography ==
Ives was born on March 5, 1824, in New York City. His father worked as the superintendent of Bellevue Hospital in New York City. A self-trained artist, Ives's art education included visits to art galleries and the Astor Library. Although he went to work at the age of 12, he continued his art education on his own.

On June 24, 1846, he married Caroline Clark (1827–1896). The couple had six children, two sons and four daughters. Caroline was the sister-in-law of Nathaniel Currier's brother, Charles Currier. Charles recommended Ives to Nathaniel, who hired him as a bookkeeper in 1852 for his firm, N. Currier, Lithographer.

It soon became apparent that Ives' talent as an artist and artistic knowledge gave him valuable insight into what the public wanted, and his skills in business and marketing contributed significantly to the growth of the company. Ives helped to improve and modernize Currier's bookkeeping methods, reorganize the firm's inventory, and streamline production methods. In 1857, Currier offered Ives a full partnership in the firm, now called Currier and Ives, and made the younger man the general manager. In his new position Ives helped Currier interview potential artists and craftsman, and select images that the firm would publish. It was Ives who encouraged production of the idealized images of daily middle class American life that made the firm so successful.

The firm of Currier and Ives was known for its popular and affordable art prints of subjects such as winter scenes, landscapes, sporting events, ships, and icons of 19th century life. These prints are still widely sought after by collectors today. Ives worked over forty years at the firm until his death in Rye, New York, in 1895. He is buried in Green-Wood Cemetery in Brooklyn. After Ives's death, his sons and Currier's sons continued to manage the firm until it was liquidated in 1907.
