= Metamorphoses in Greek mythology =

Myths centered around physical transformation in Greek mythology

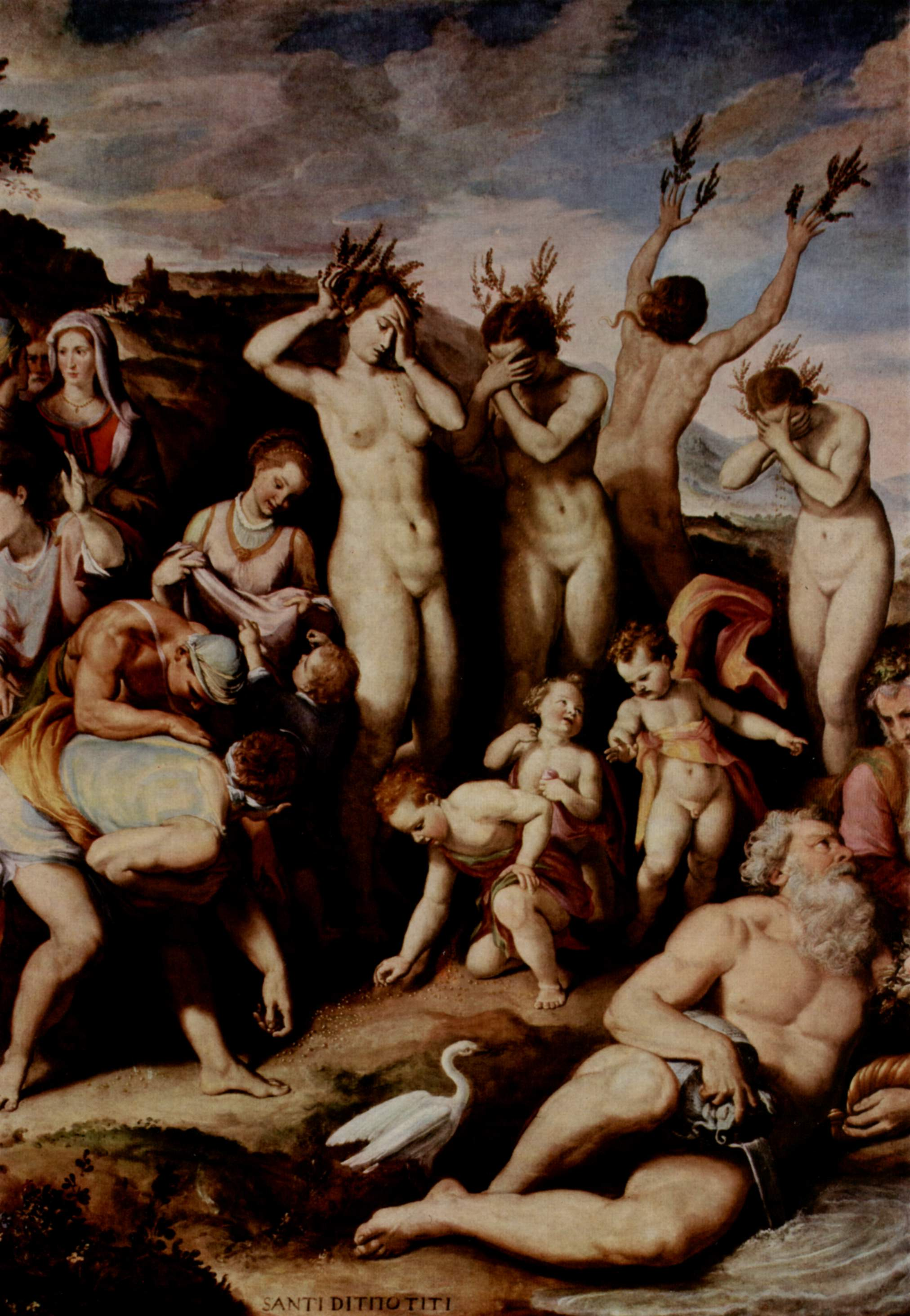
The Sisters of Phaethon are Transformed into Poplars by Santi di Tito, 16th century.

In ancient Greece, the surviving Greek mythology features a wide collection of myths where the subjects are physically transformed, usually through either divine intervention or sorcery and spells. Similar themes of physical transformation are found in all types of mythologies, folklore, and visual arts around the world, including those of Mesopotamian, Roman (Ovid's Metamorphoses), medieval (Western Christian), and ancient Chinese.

Stories of shapeshifting within Greek context are old, having been part of the mythological corpus as far back as the Iliad of Homer. Usually those legends include mortals being changed as punishment from a god, or as a reward for their good deeds. In other tales, gods take different forms in order to test or deceive some mortal. There is a wide variety of type of transformations; from human to animal, from animal to human, from human to plant, from inanimate object to human, from human to inanimate object (petrifaction), from one sex to another, from human to the stars (constellations).

Myths were used to justify or explain or legitimate a precedent, traditions, codes of behaviours and laws. Ancient Greek taboos and prohibitions could also find a place in mythological narrative, as some provided cautionary tales in the form of a fable. Myths about nature, and the transformation into it, attempted to provide a coherent history and tell the origins of the world, the nature, animals, humans and the gods themselves. Accordingly, there has always been efforts to explain the very supernatural elements of those myths in turn, even within Ancient Greece itself, such as the cases of Palaephatus and Heraclitus, who tried to rationalise those myths as misunderstandings.

The fullest surviving and most famous ancient work about transformation in Greek myth is Roman poet Ovid's epic the Metamorphoses. Throughout history, the Metamorphoses has been used not only as a compendium of information on Ancient Greek and Roman lore, but also as a vehicle for allegorical exposition, exegesis, commentaries and adaptations. True enough, in the medieval West, Ovid's work was the principal conduit of Greek myths.

Although Ovid's collection is the most known, there are three examples of Metamorphoses by later Hellenistic writers that preceded Ovid's book, but little is known of their contents. The Heteroioumena by Nicander of Colophon is better known, and had a clear influence on the poem. However, in a way that was typical for writers of the period, Ovid diverged significantly from his models. Nicander's work consisted of probably four or five books and positioned itself within a historical framework. Other works include Boios's Ornithogonia (which included tales of humans becoming birds) and little-known Antoninus Liberalis's own Metamorphoses, which drew heavily from Nicander and Boios.

Below is a list of permanent and involuntary transformations featured in Greek and Roman mythological corpus.

== List ==
=== Metamorphoses into plants ===
Metamorphoses into plants
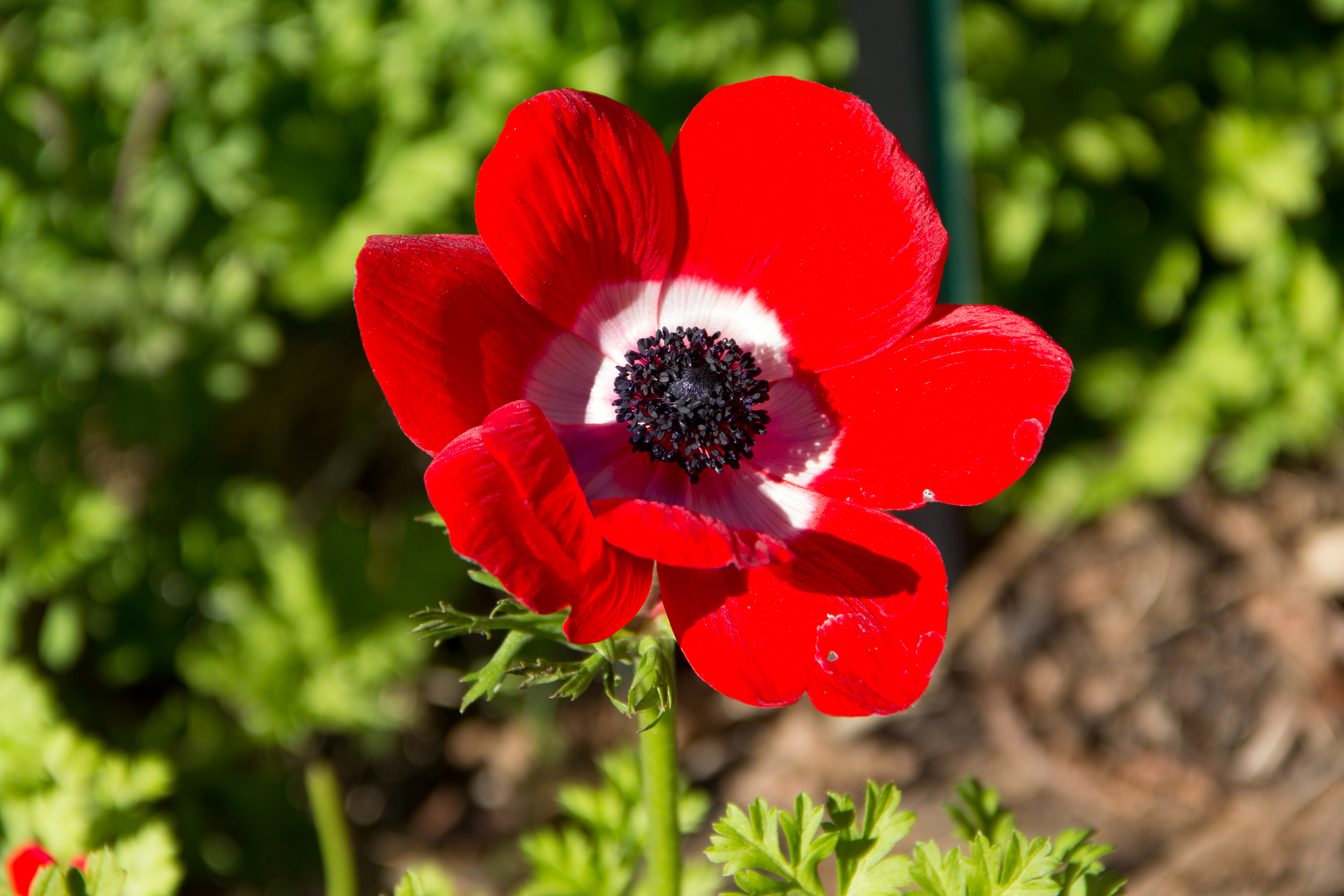
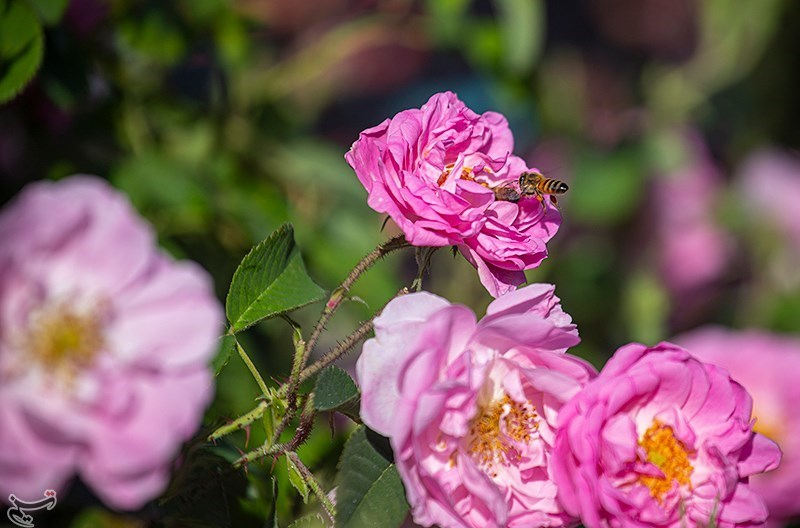
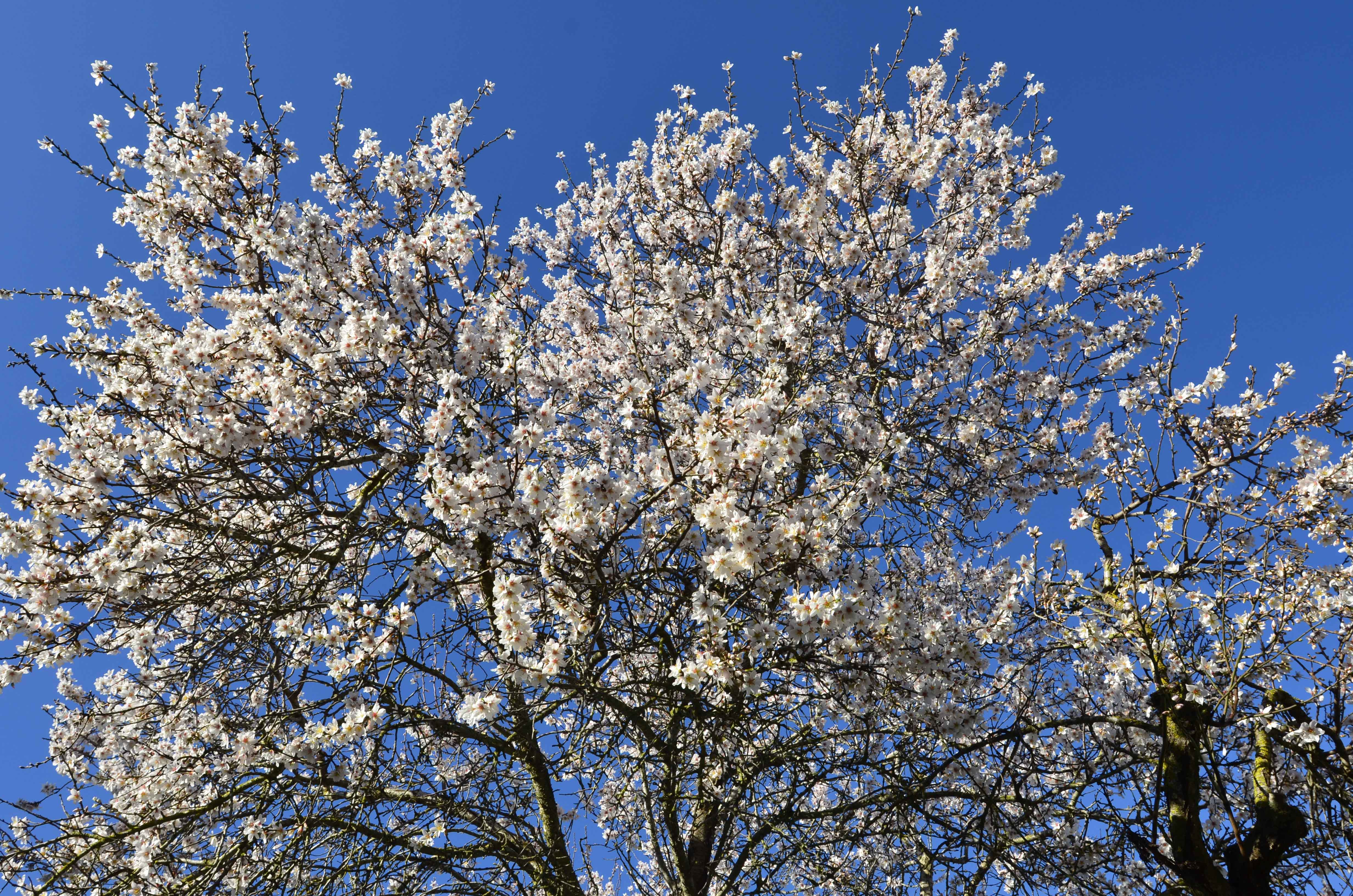
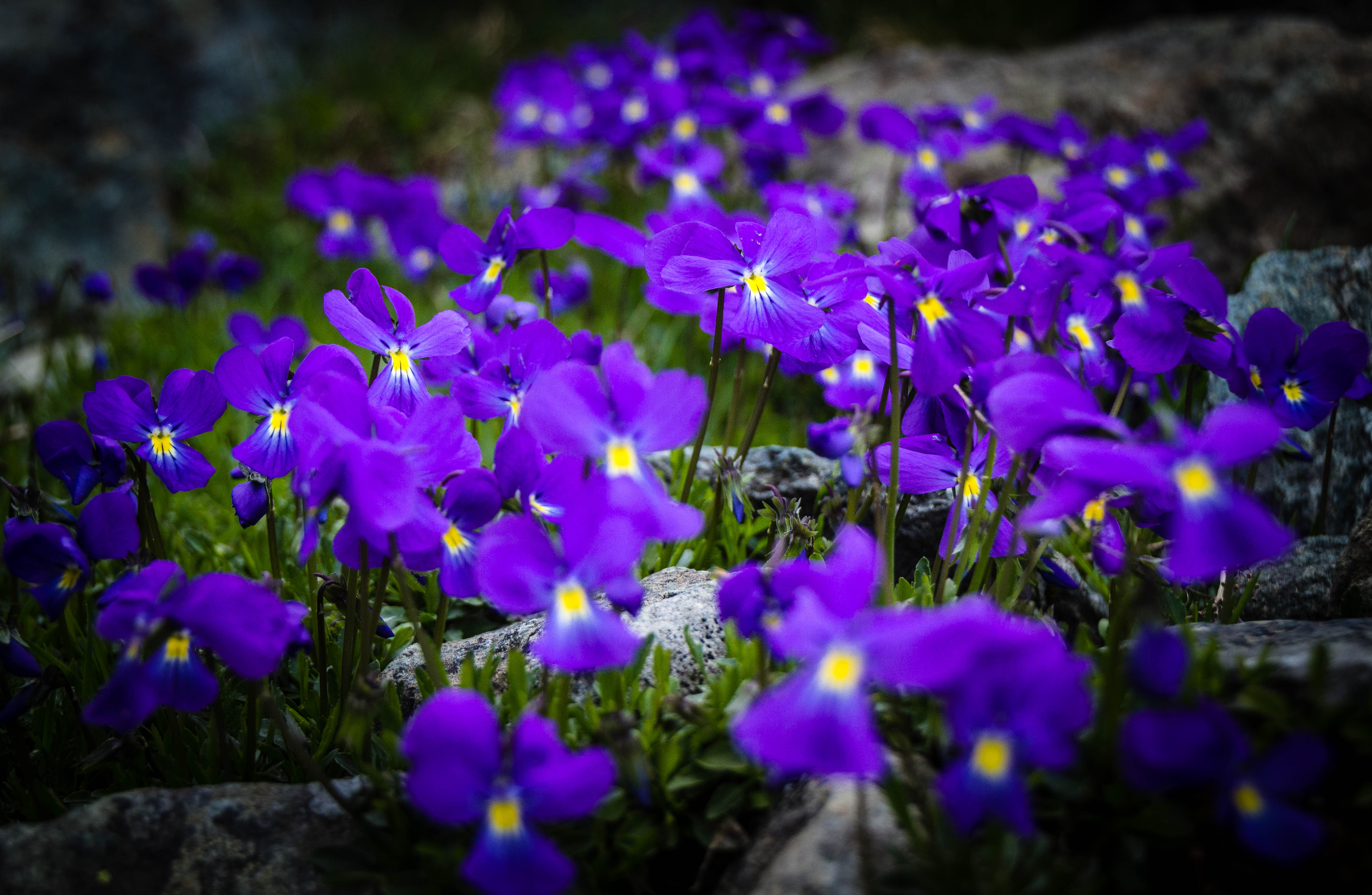
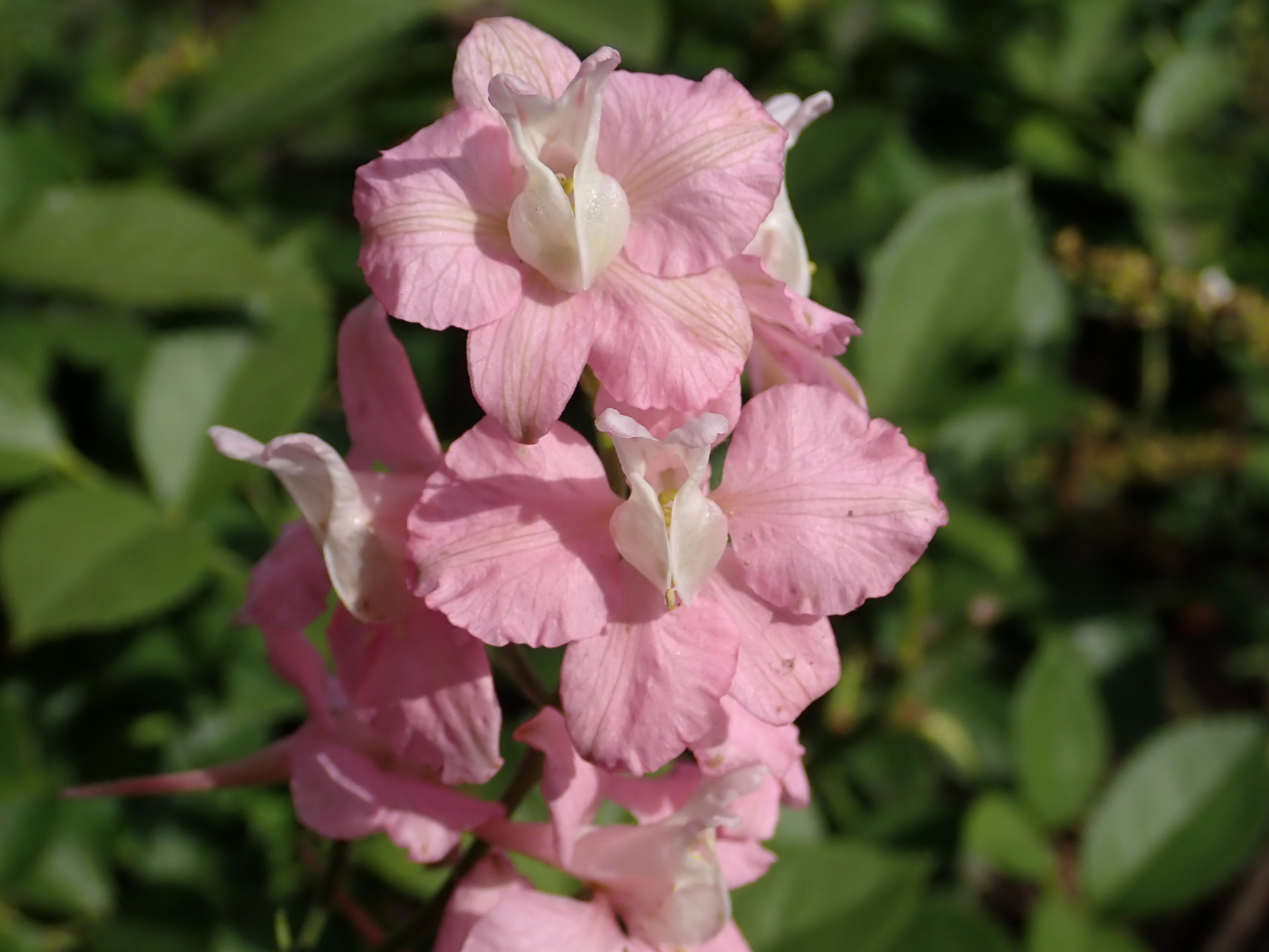
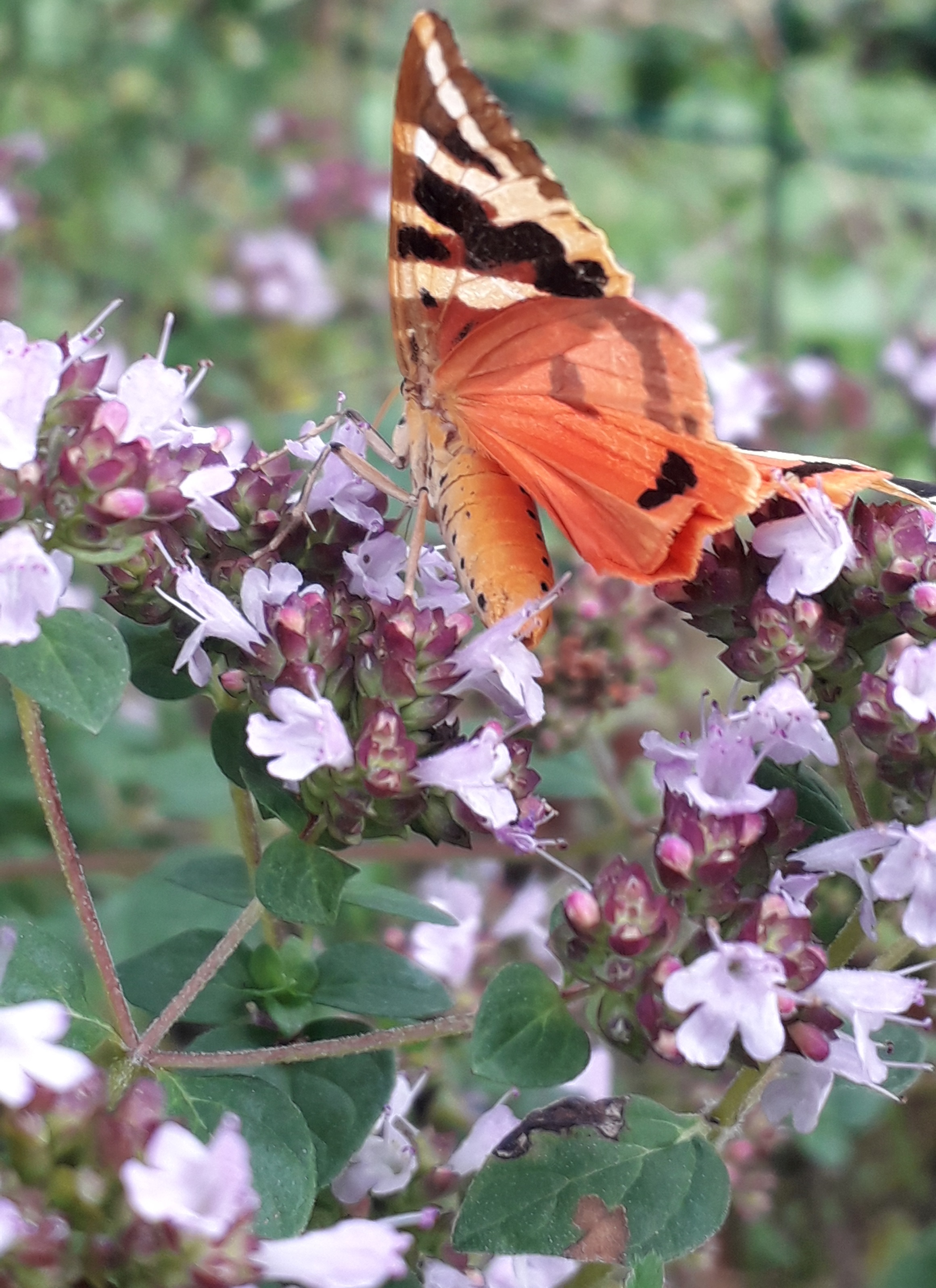
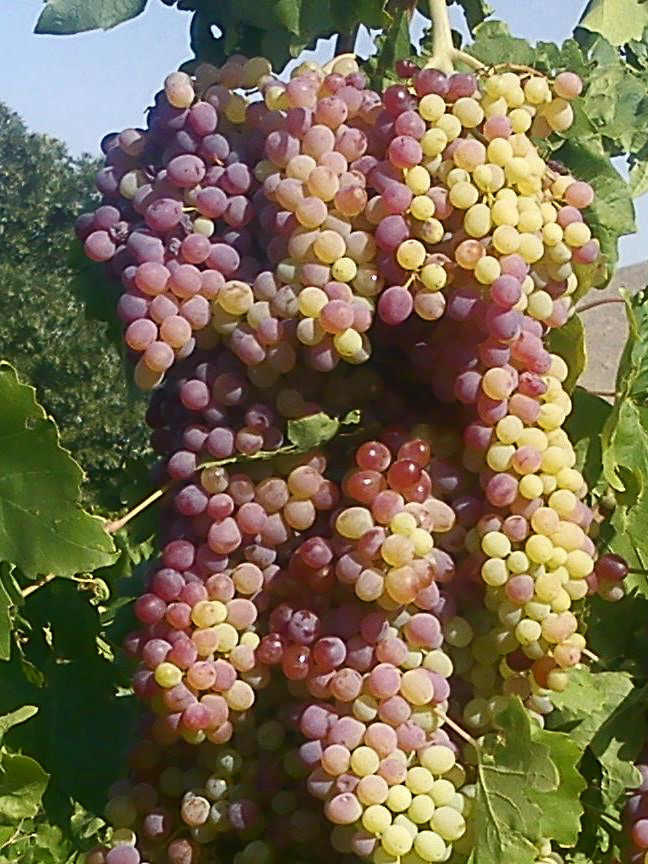
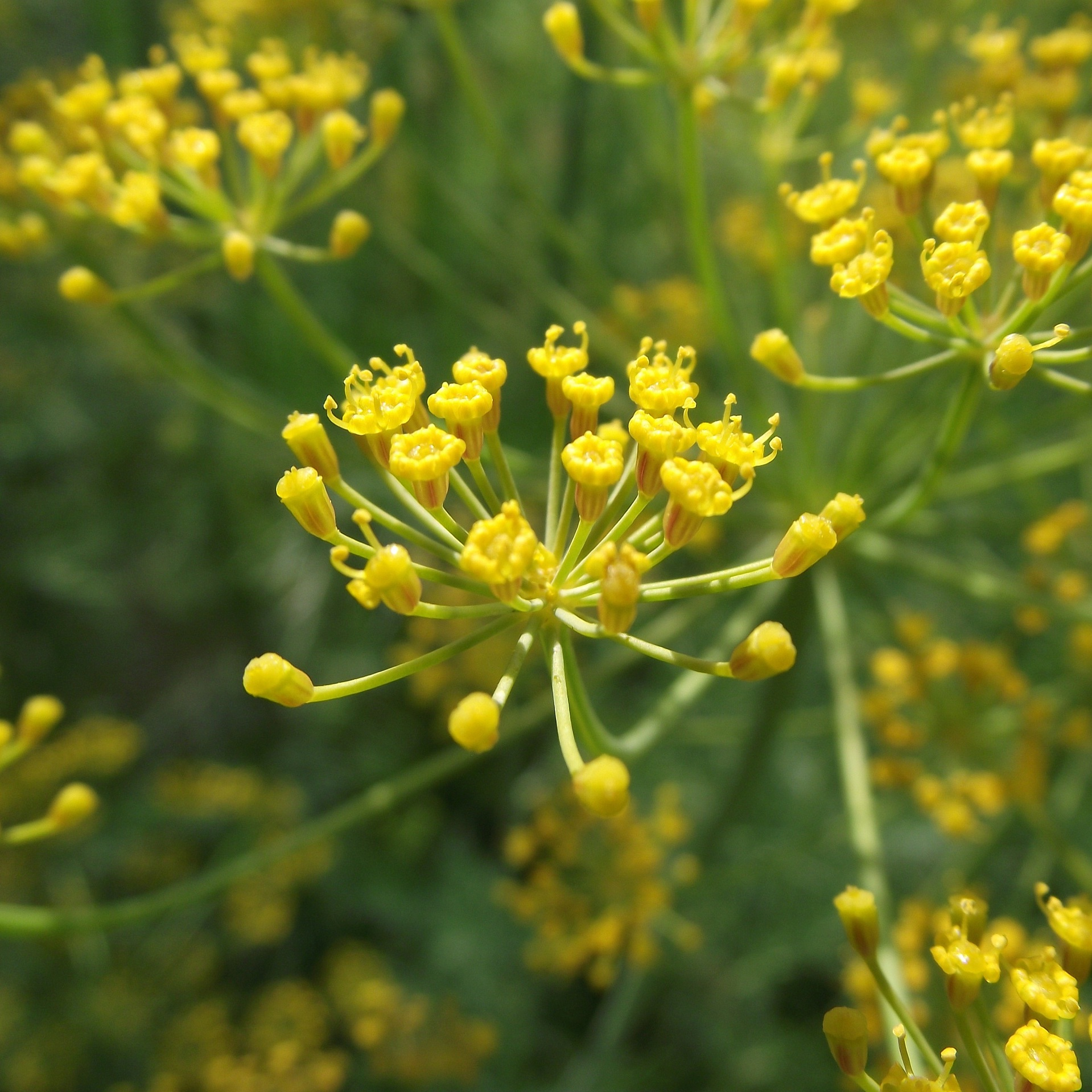
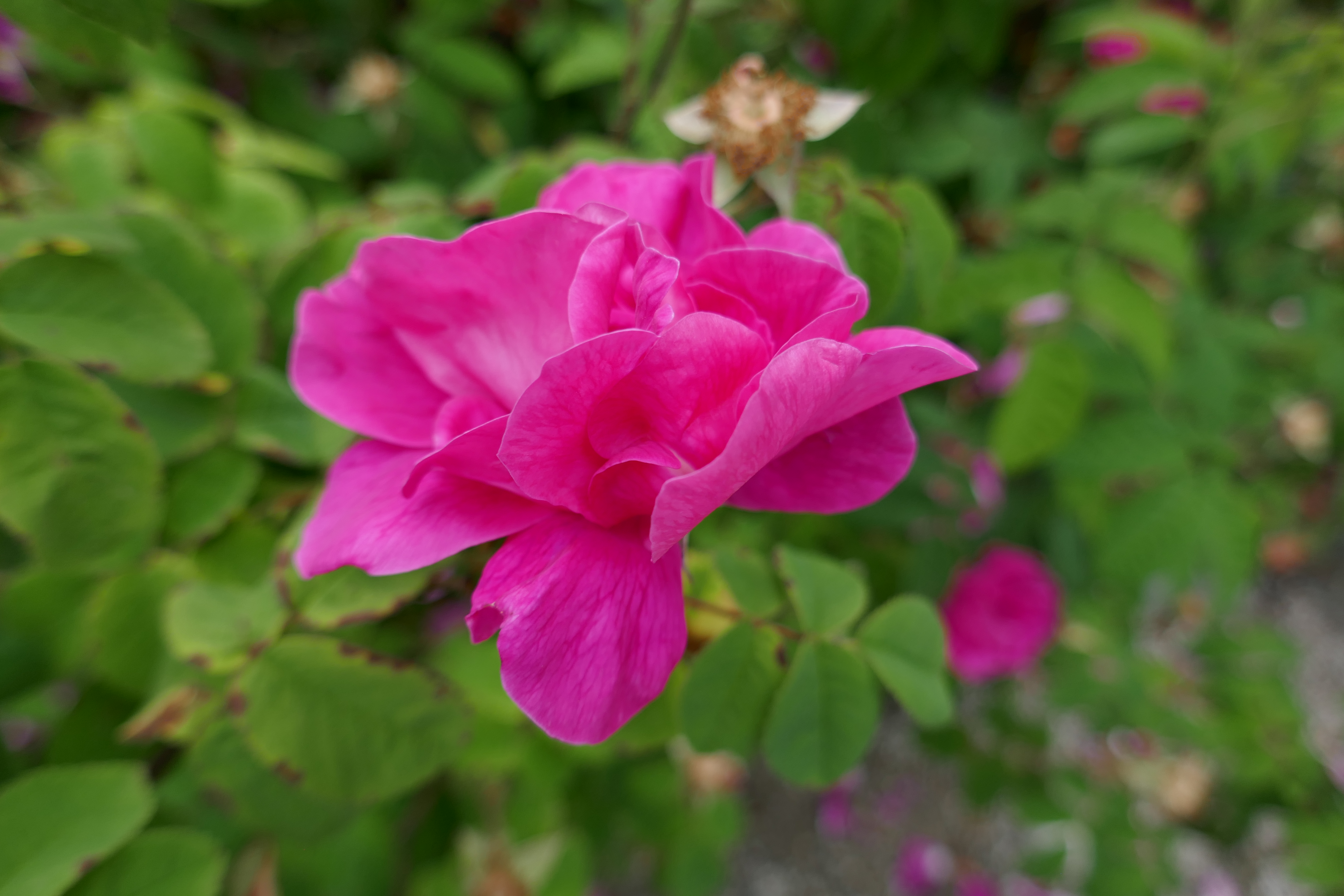
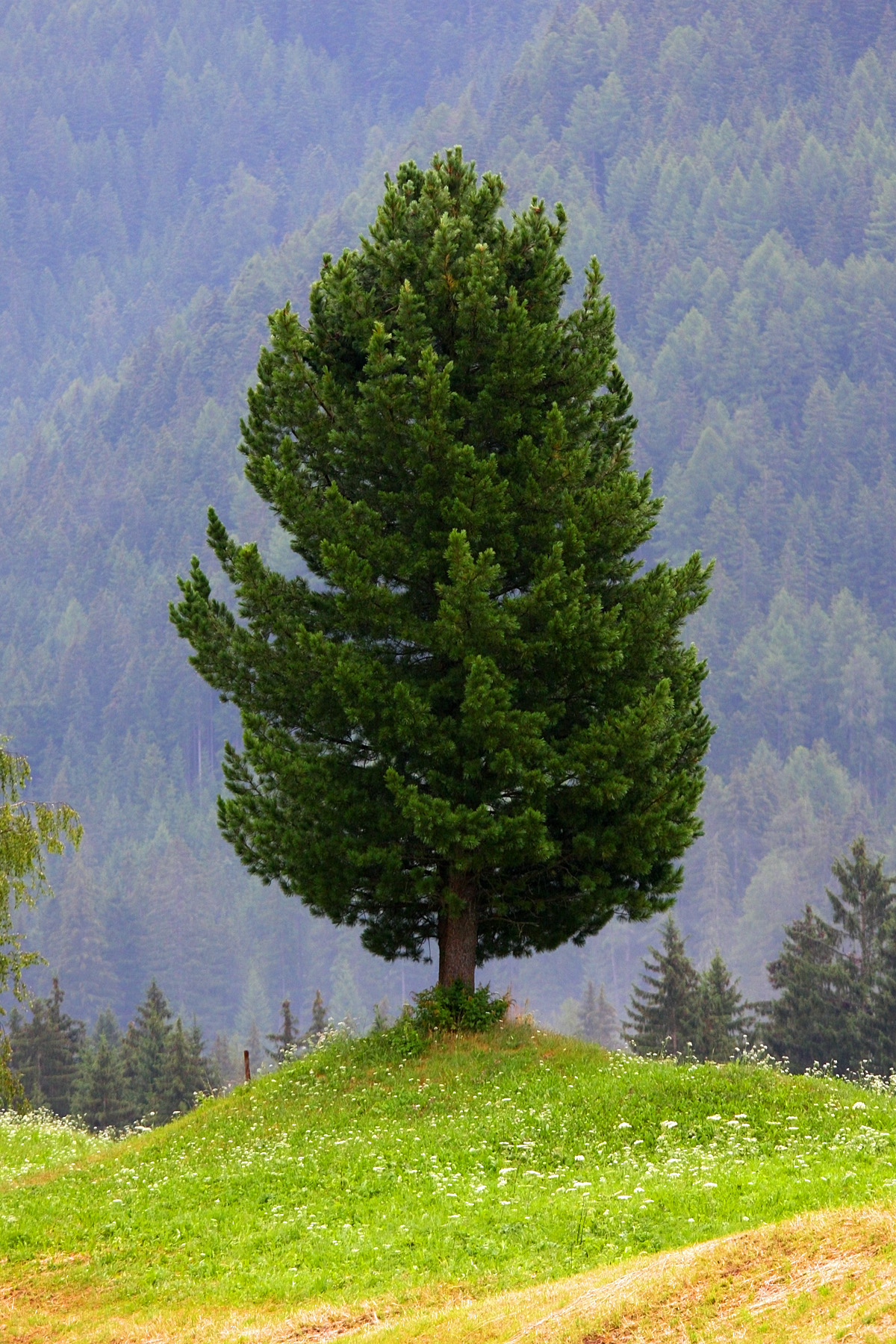
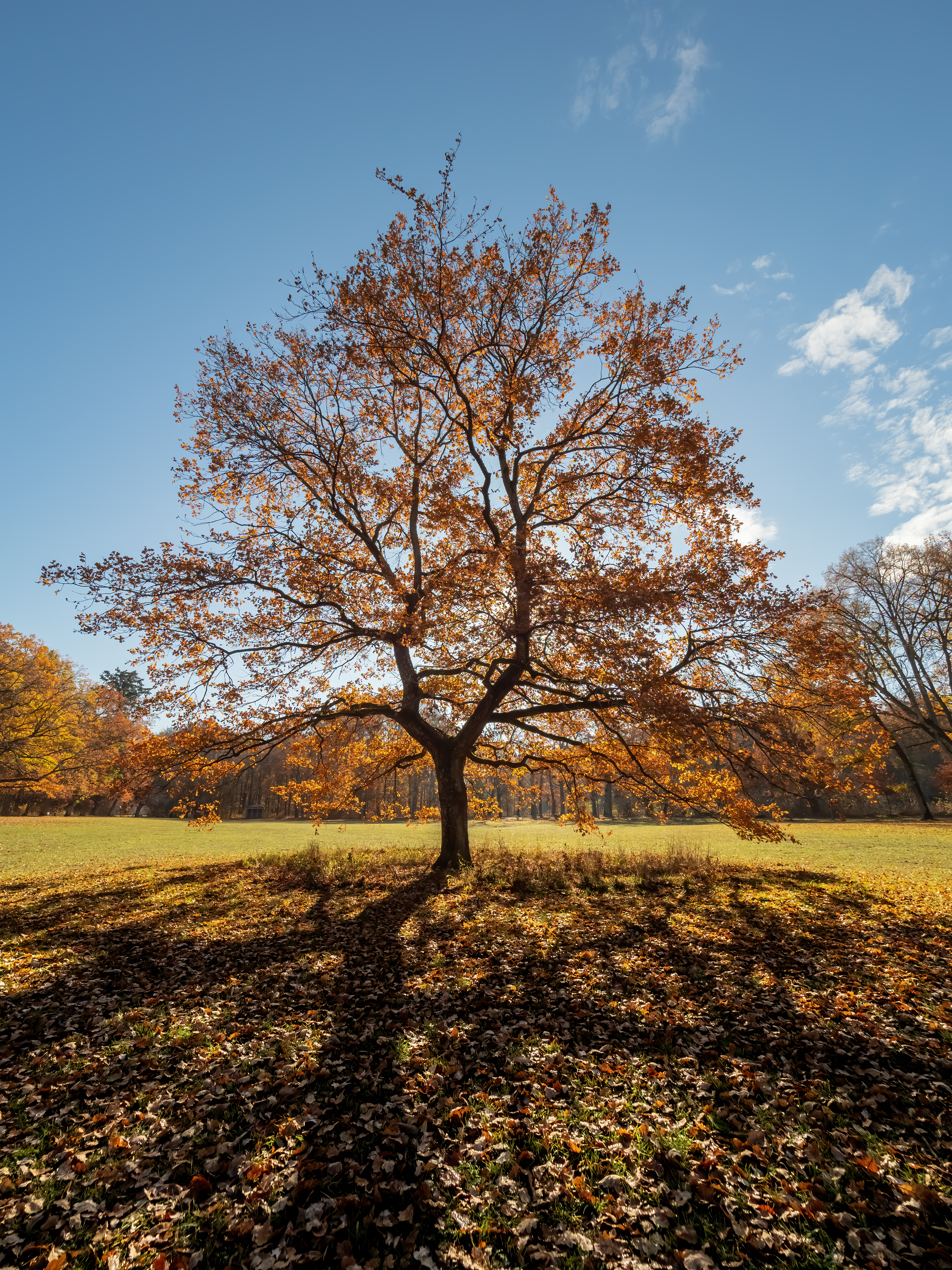
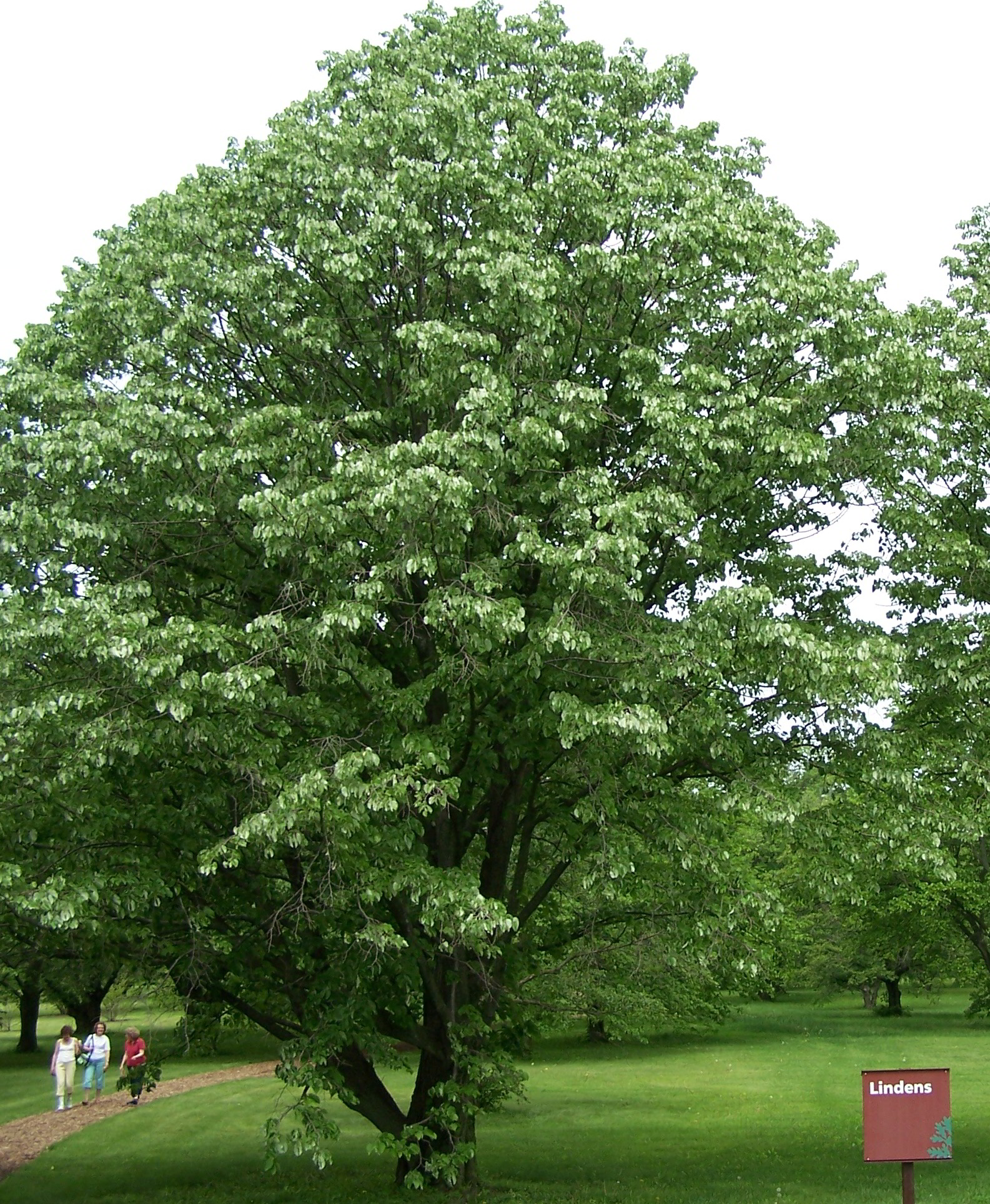
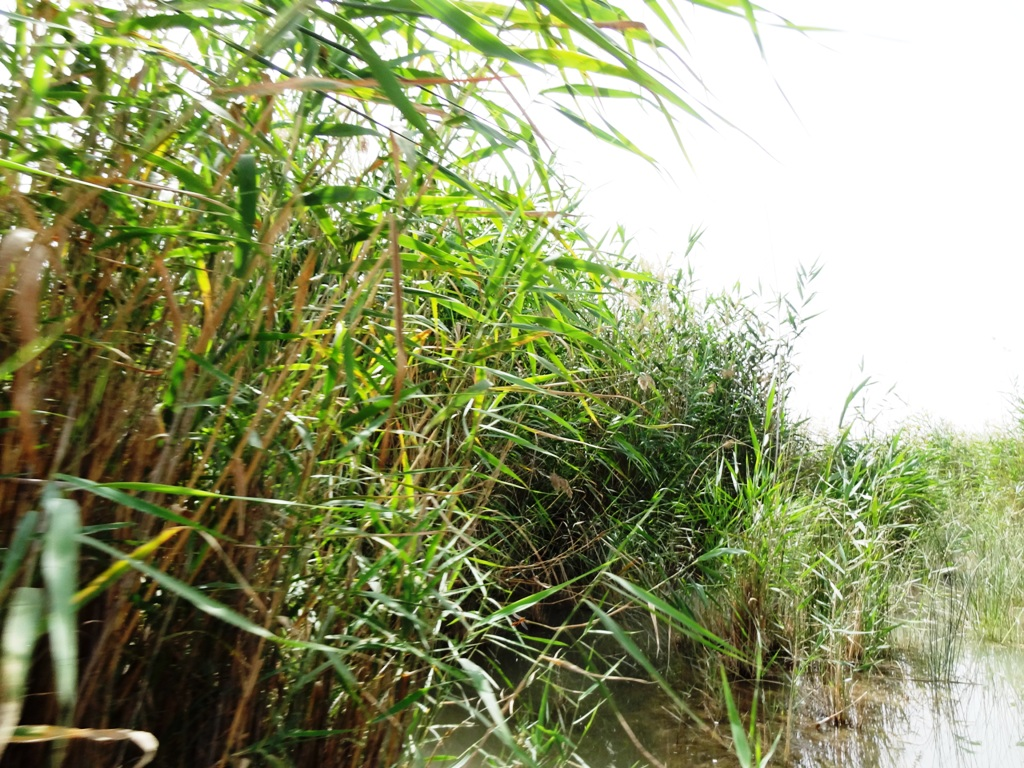
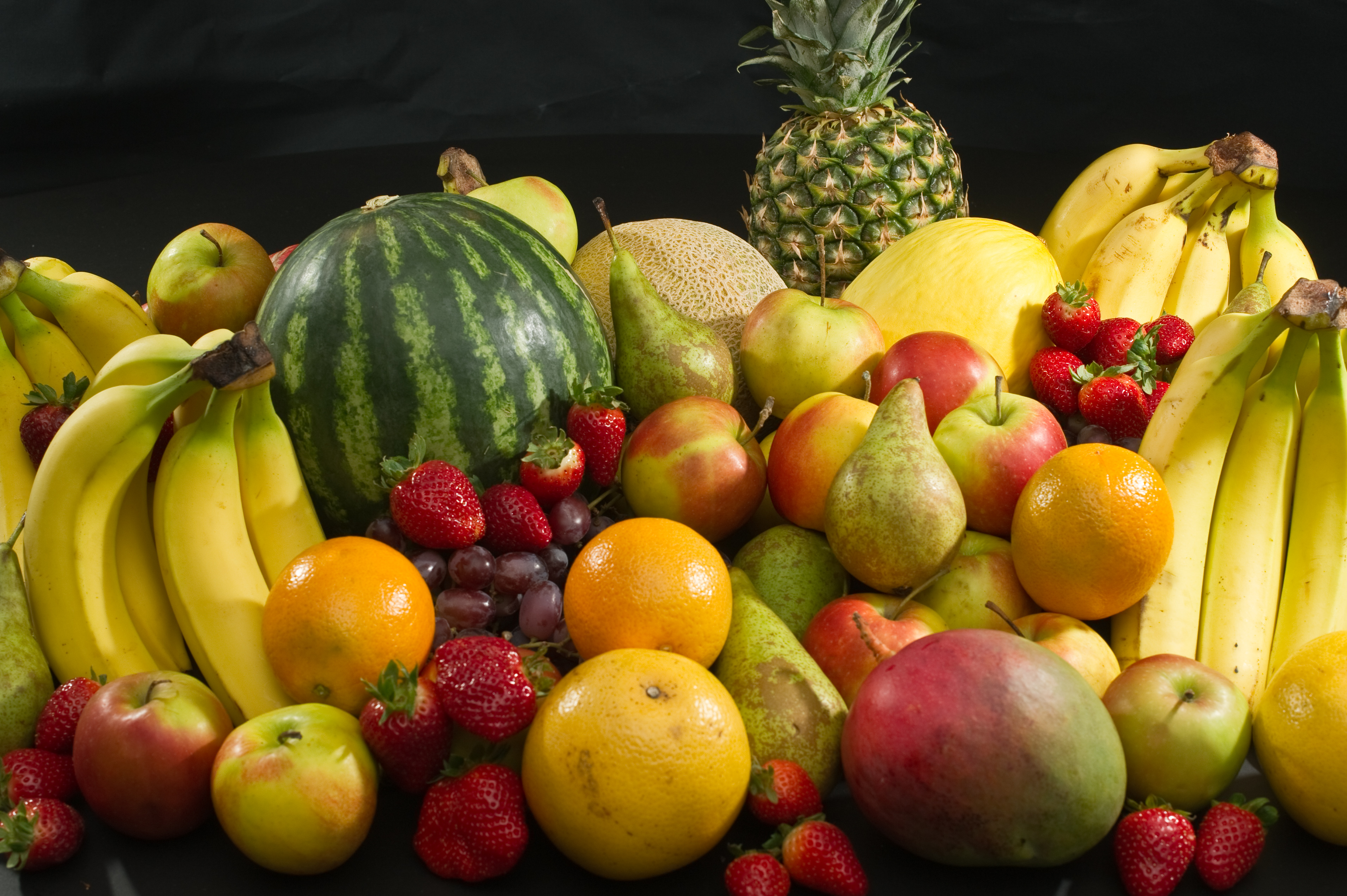
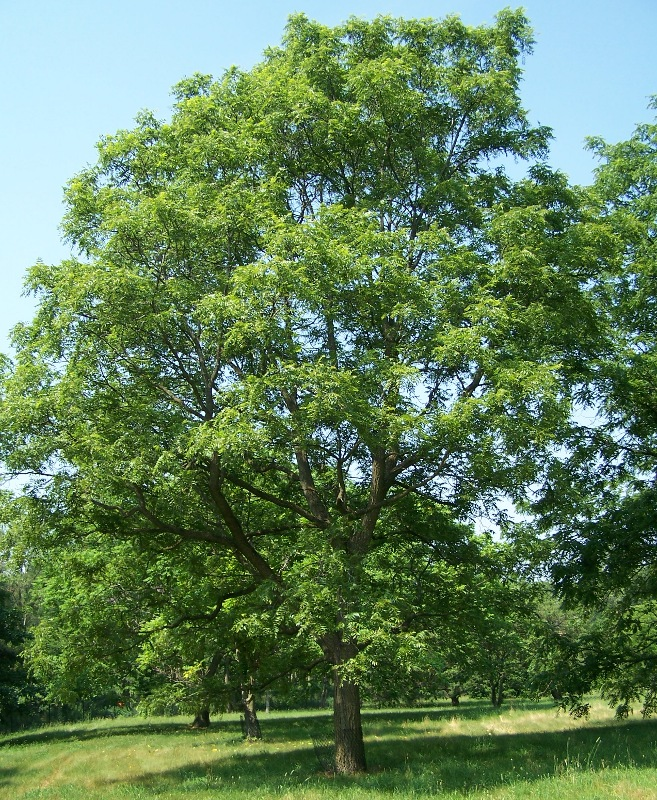
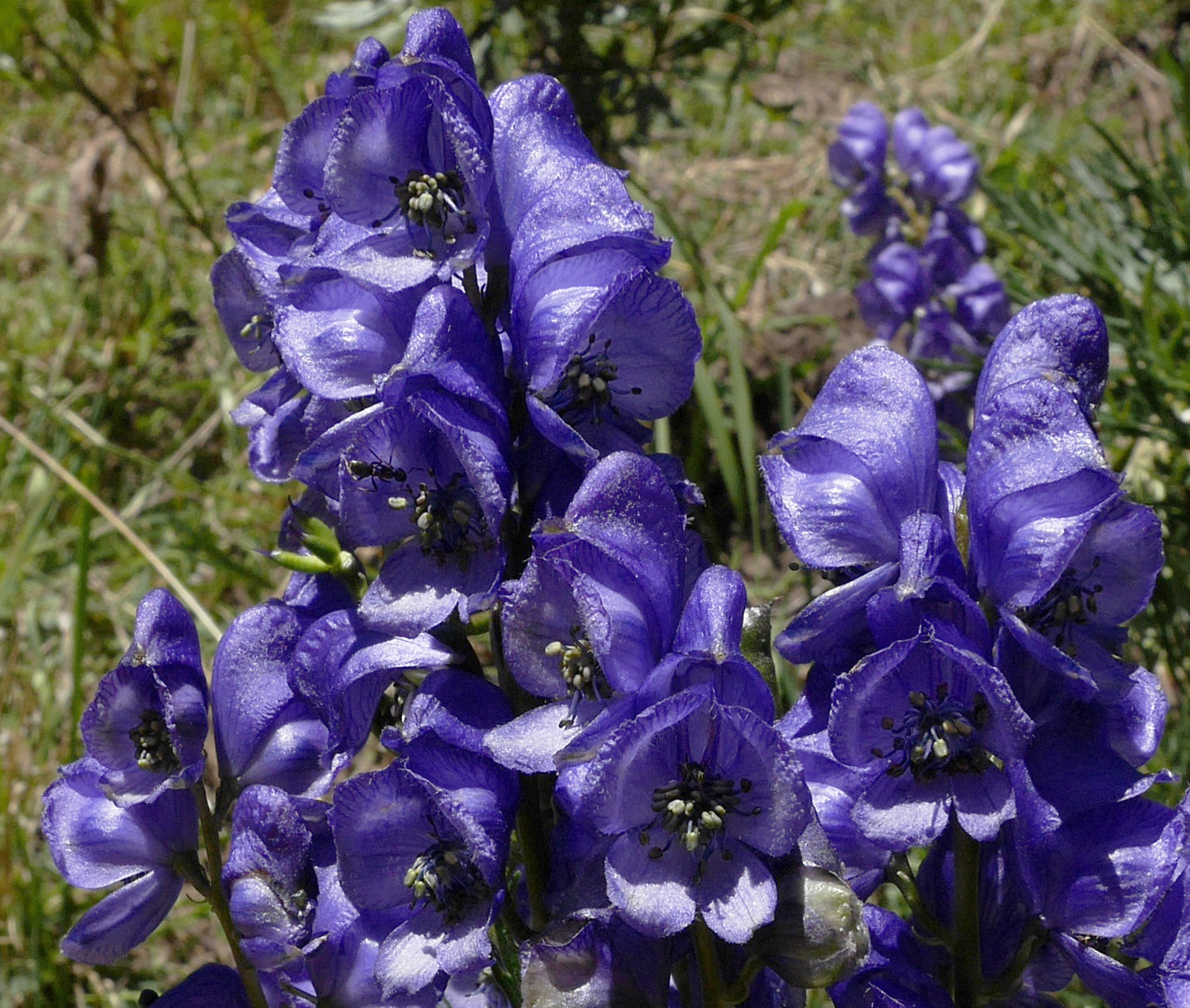
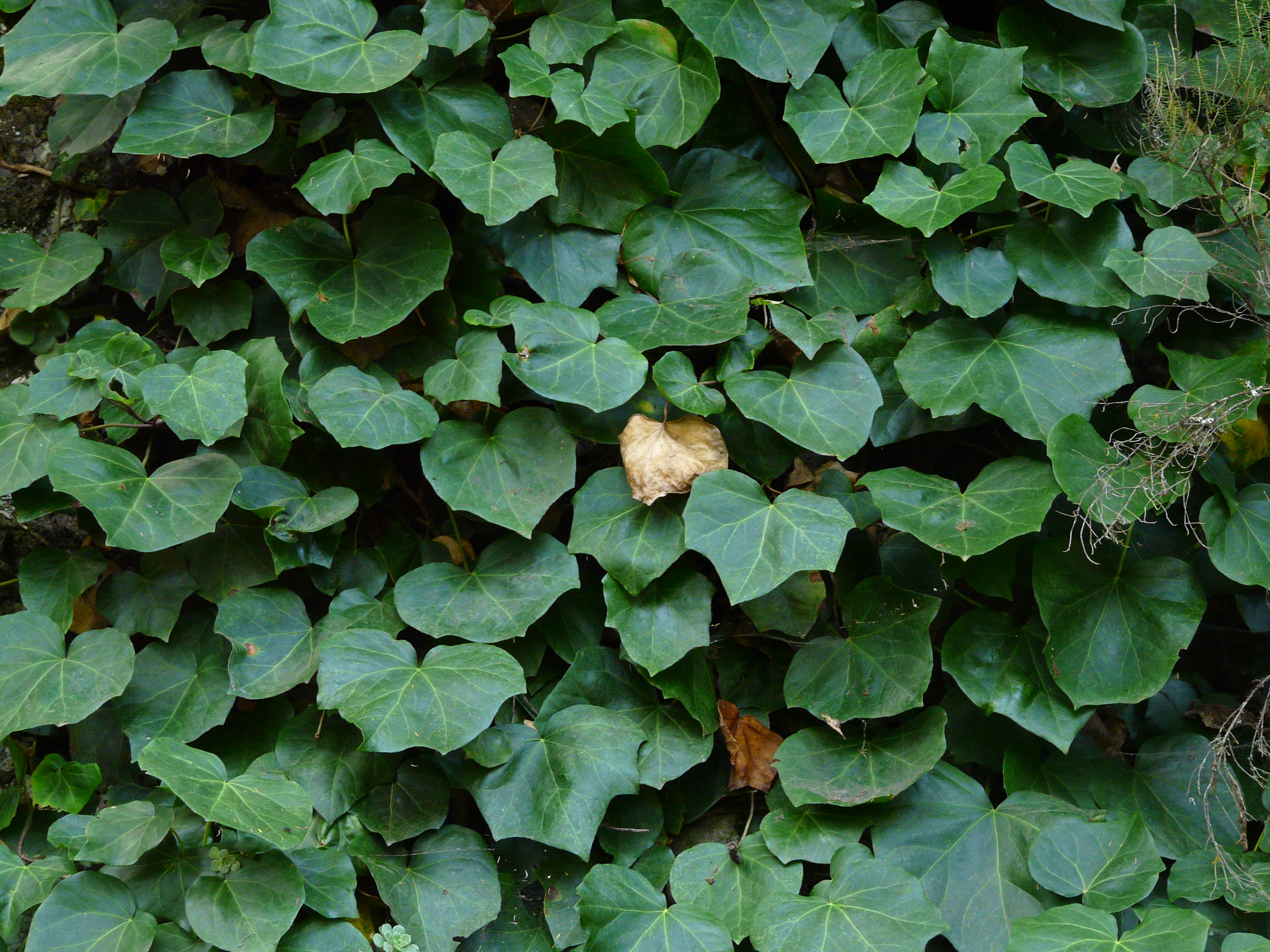
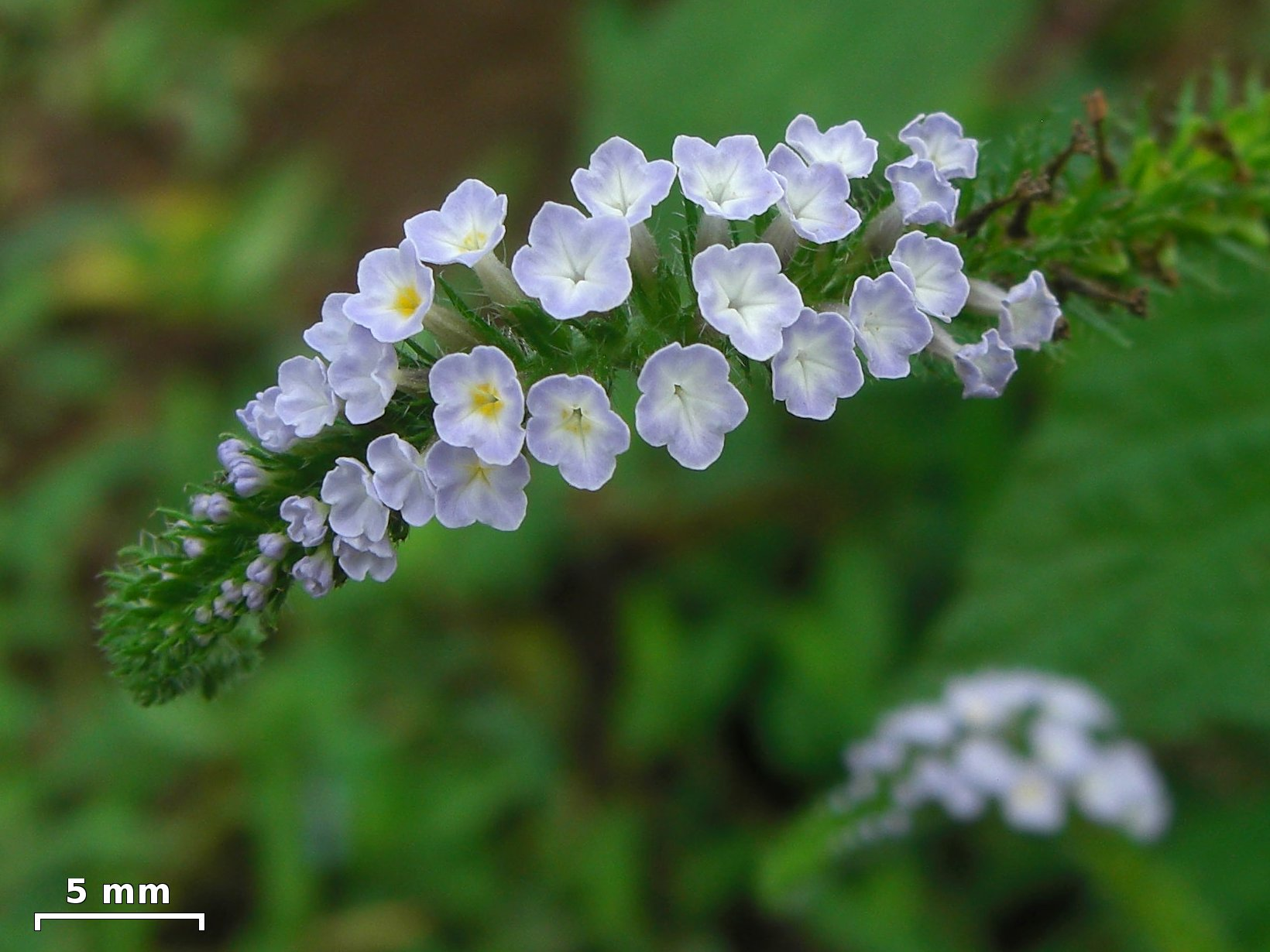
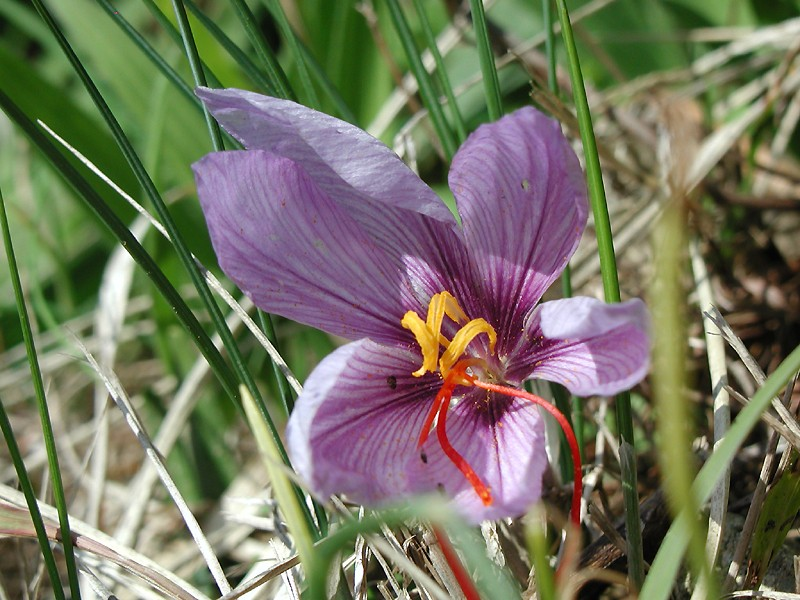
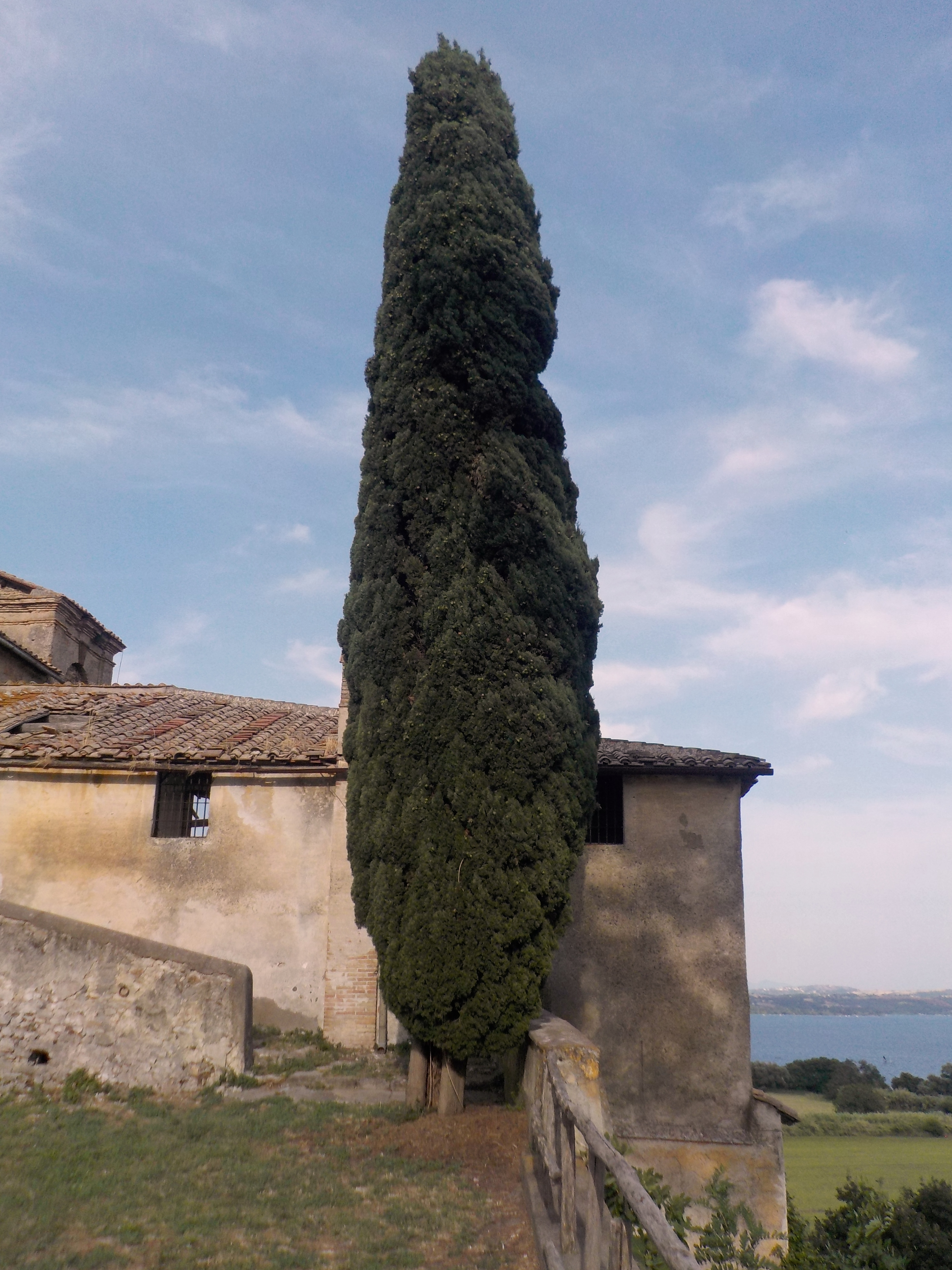
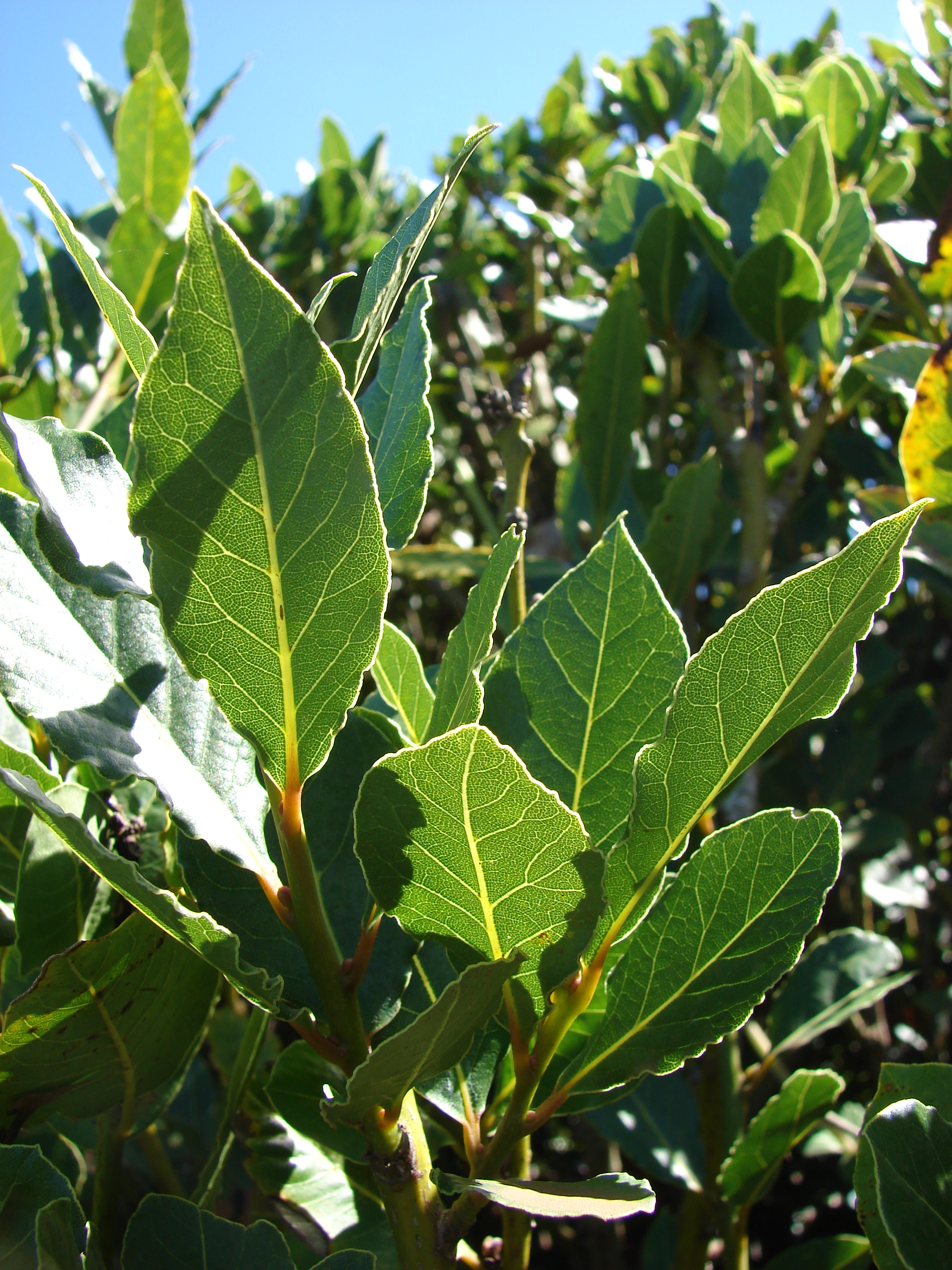
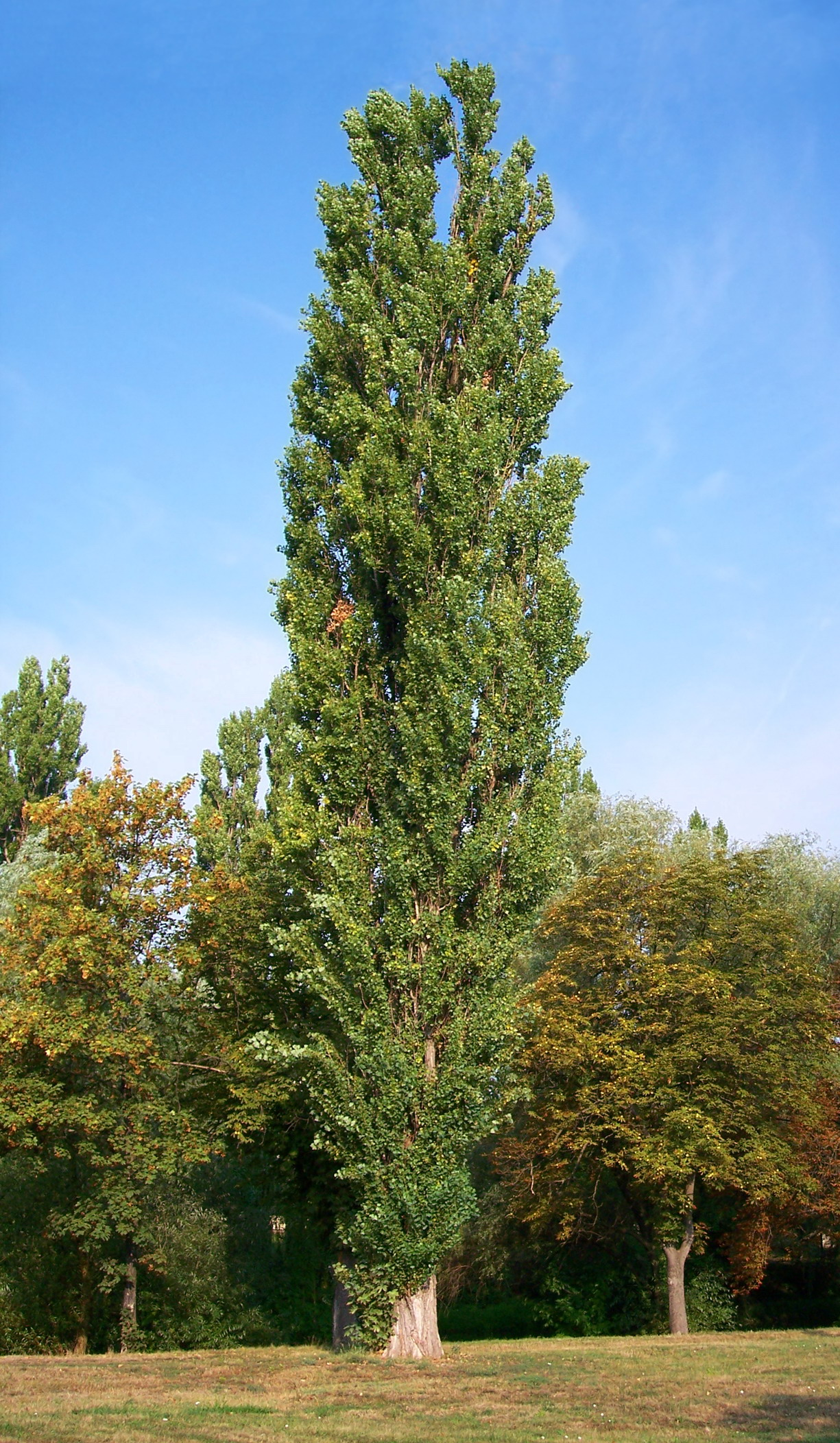
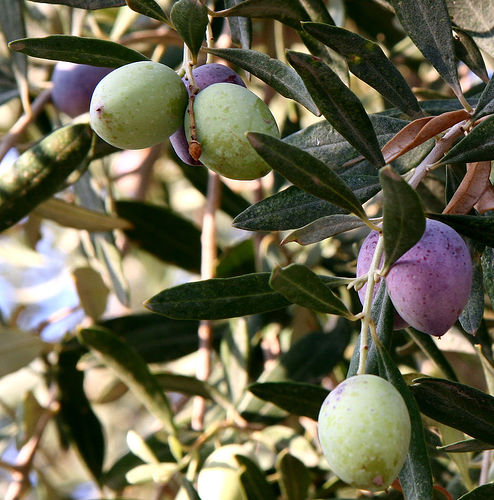
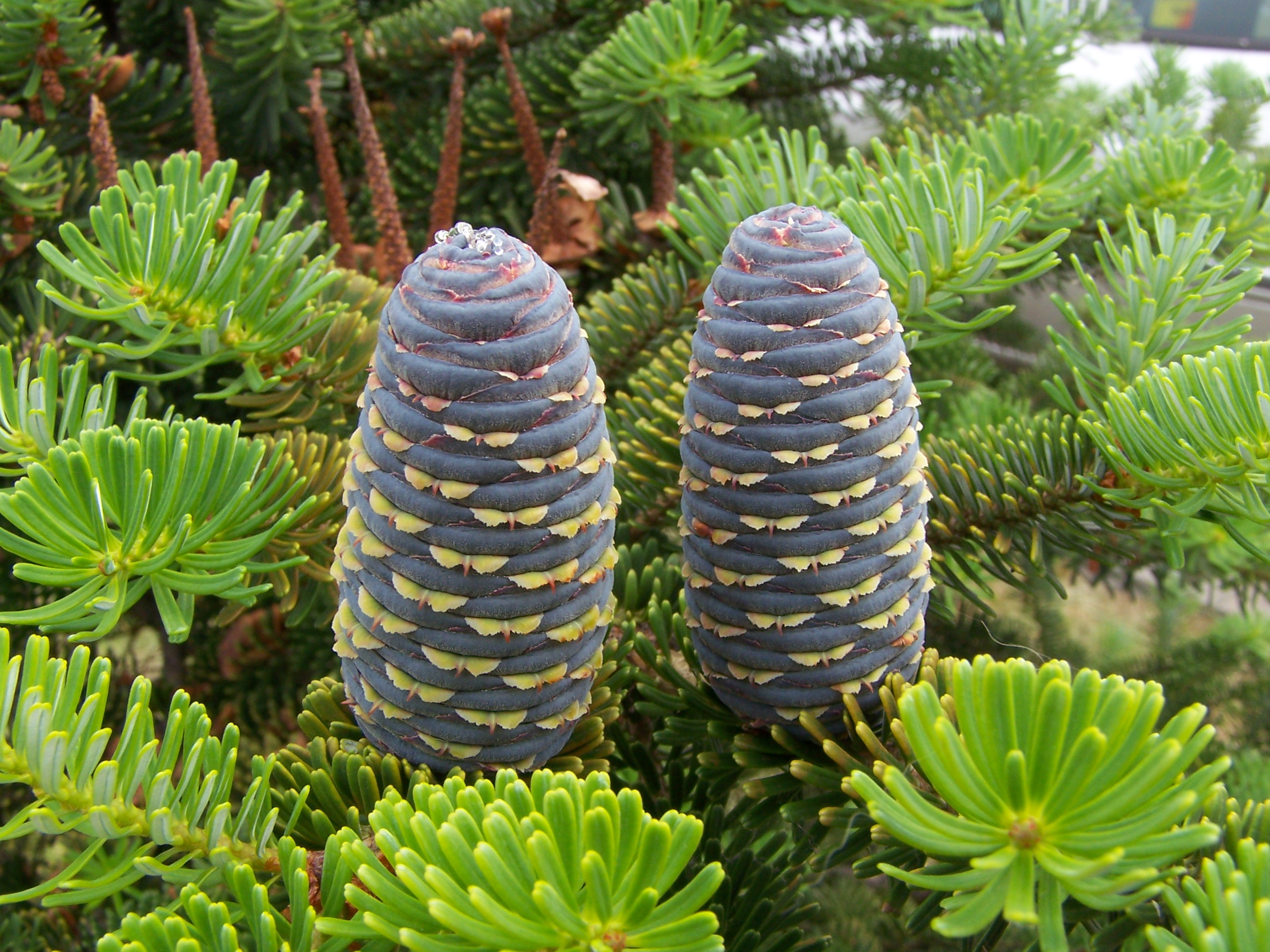
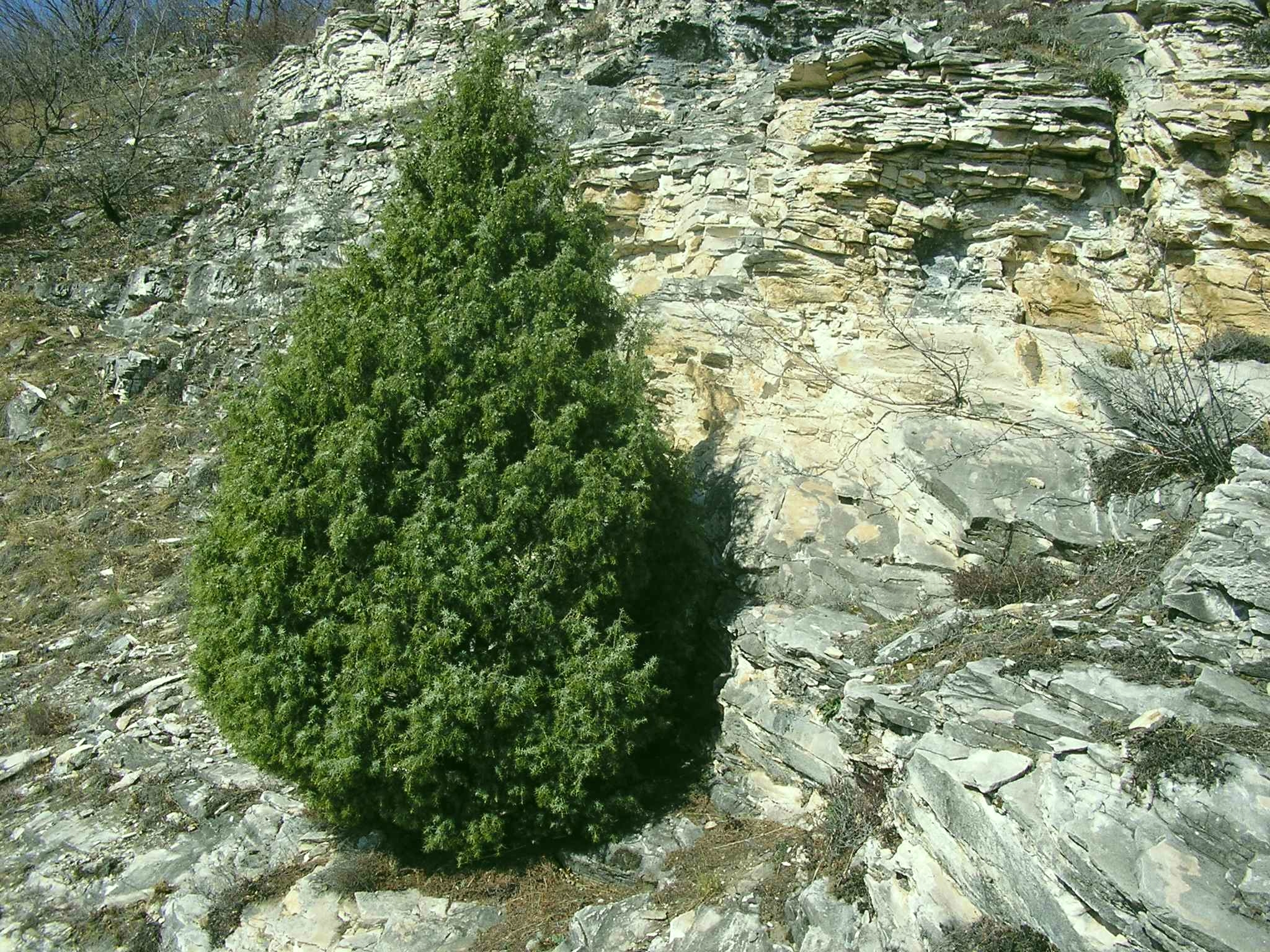
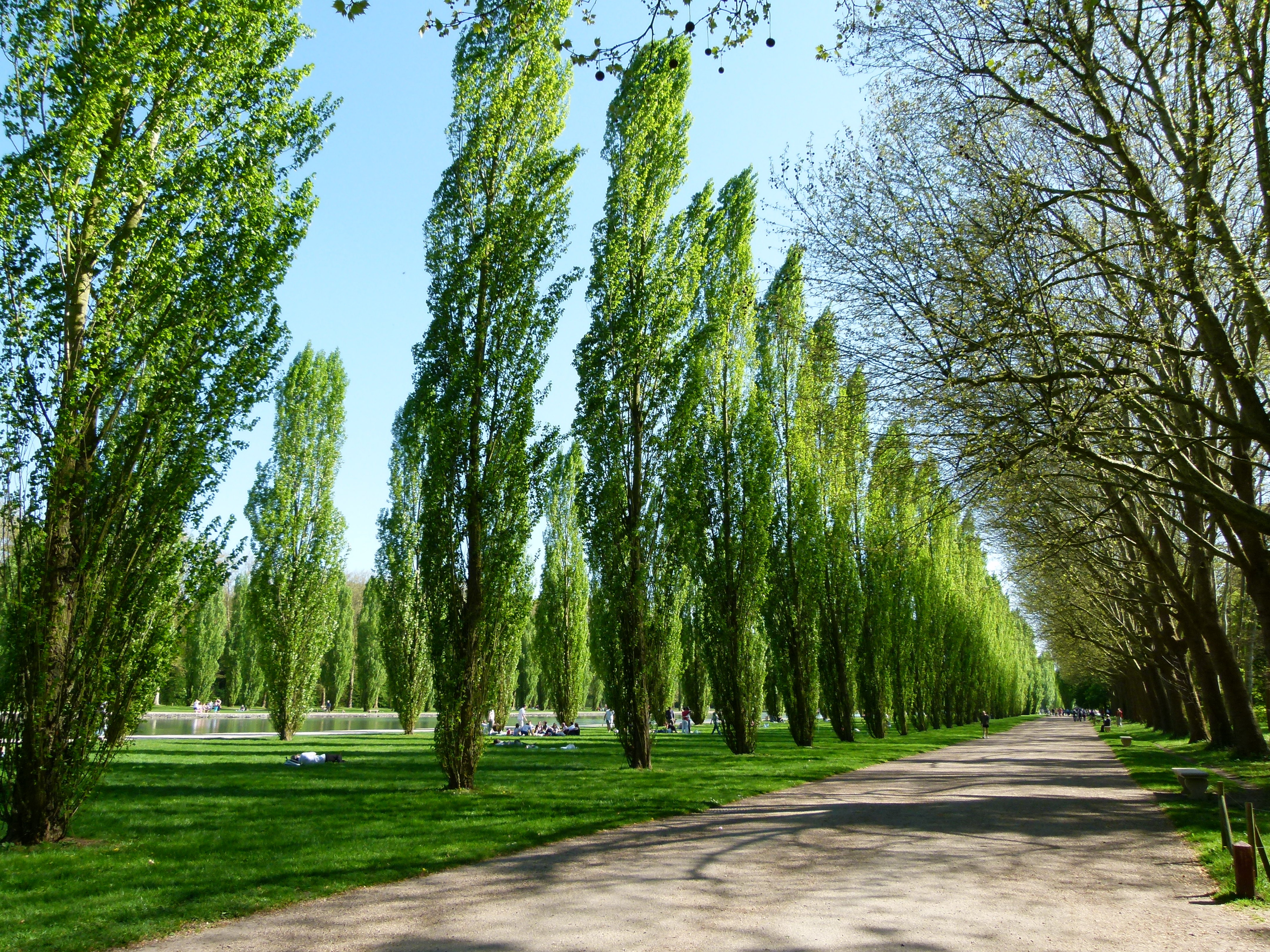
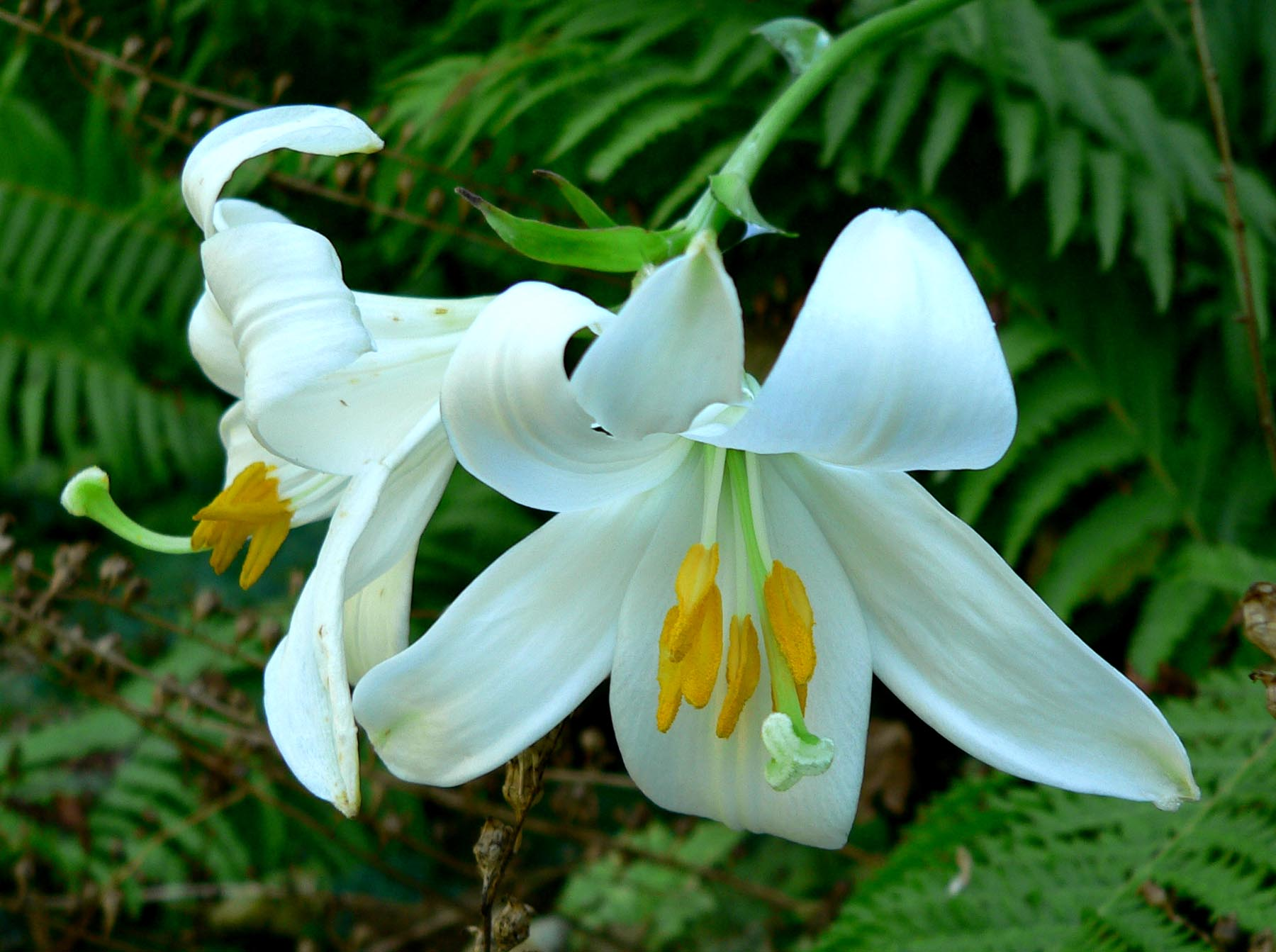
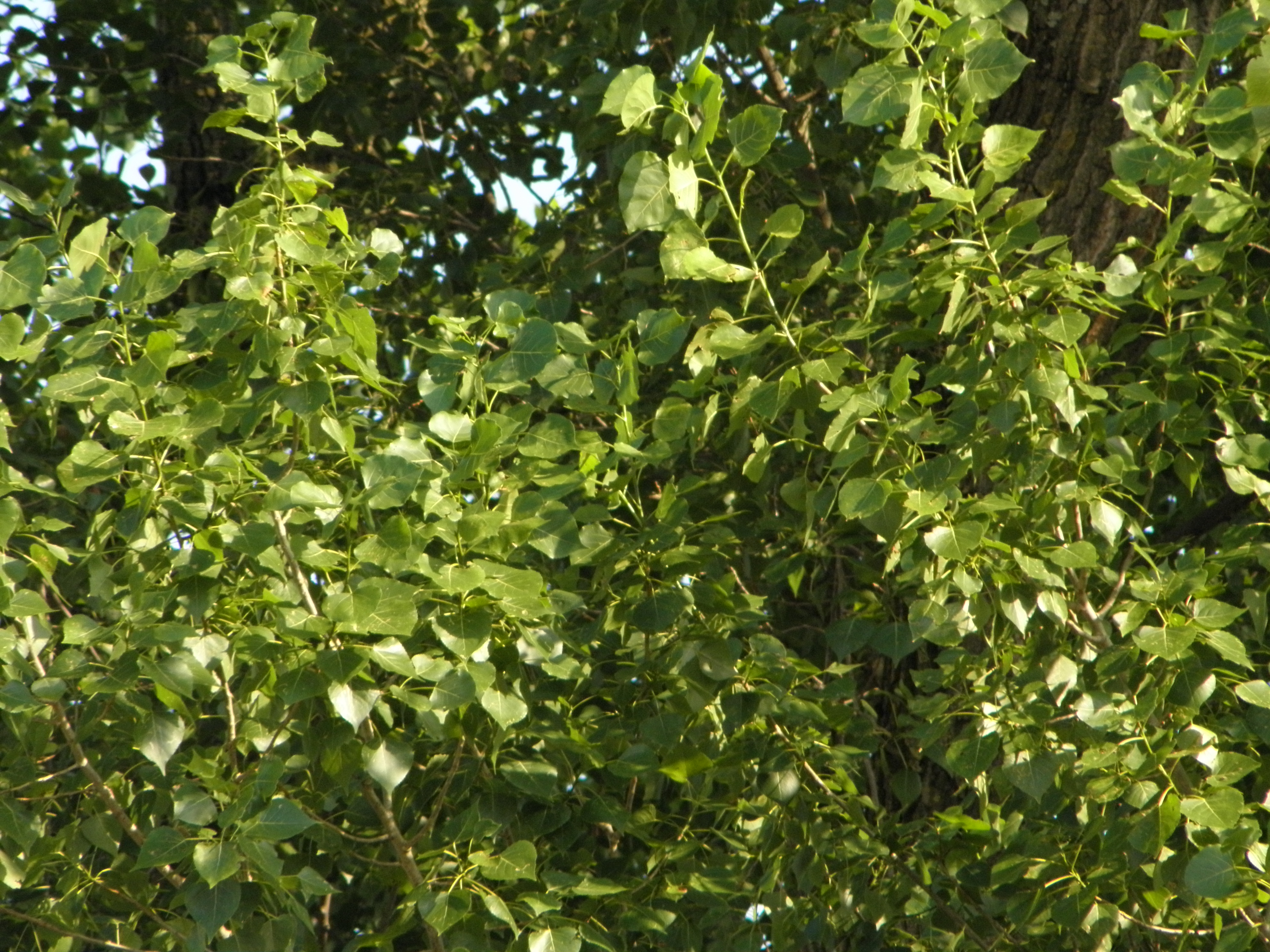
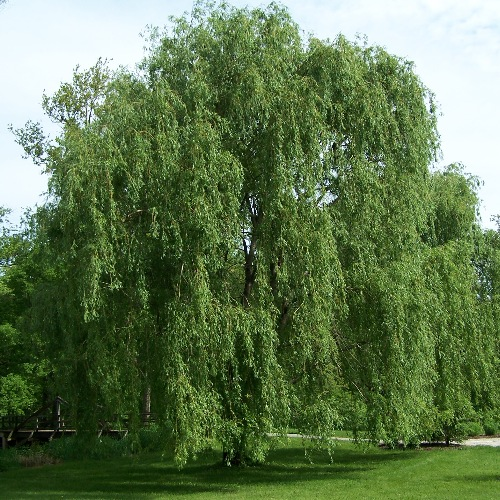
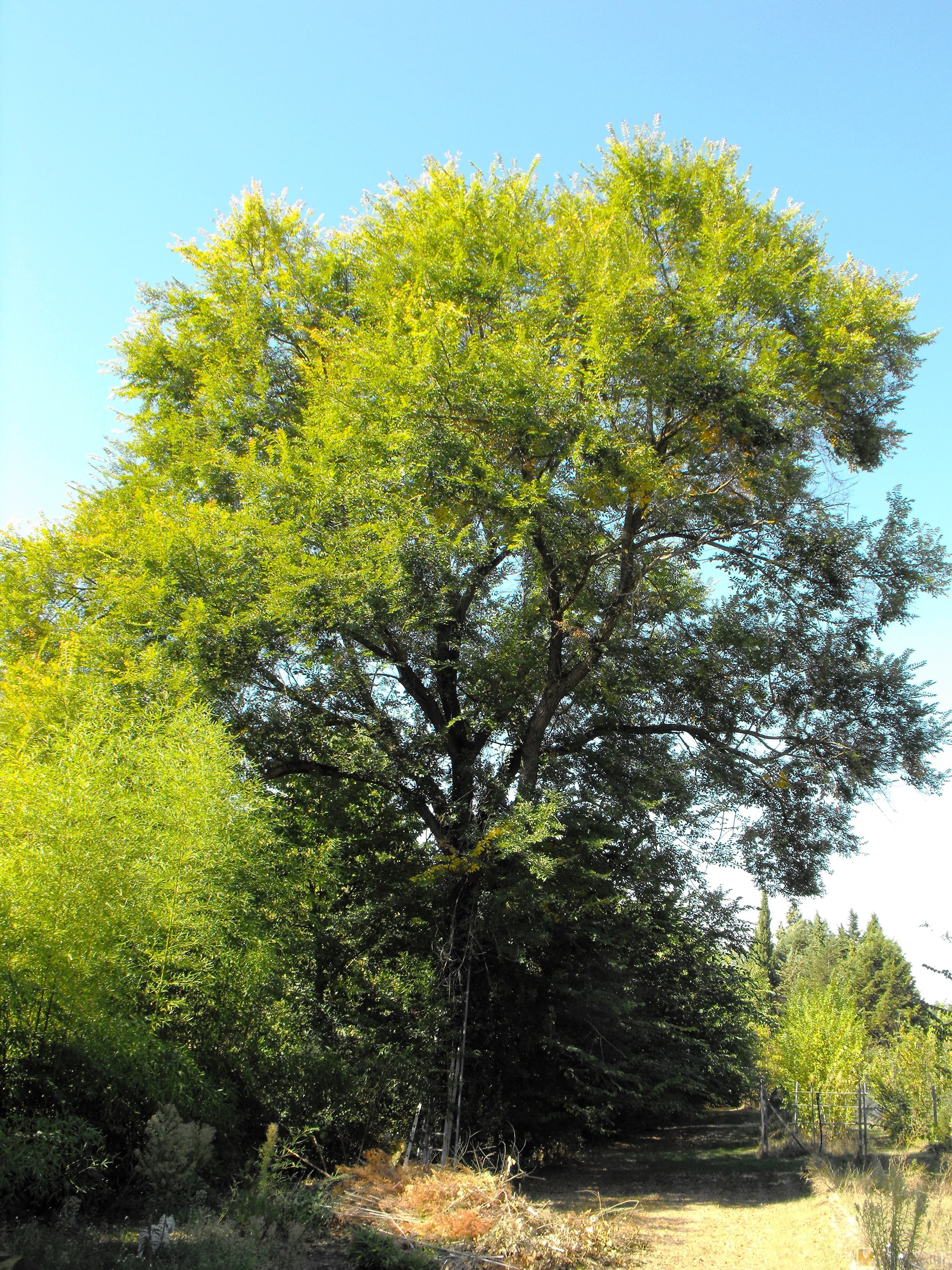
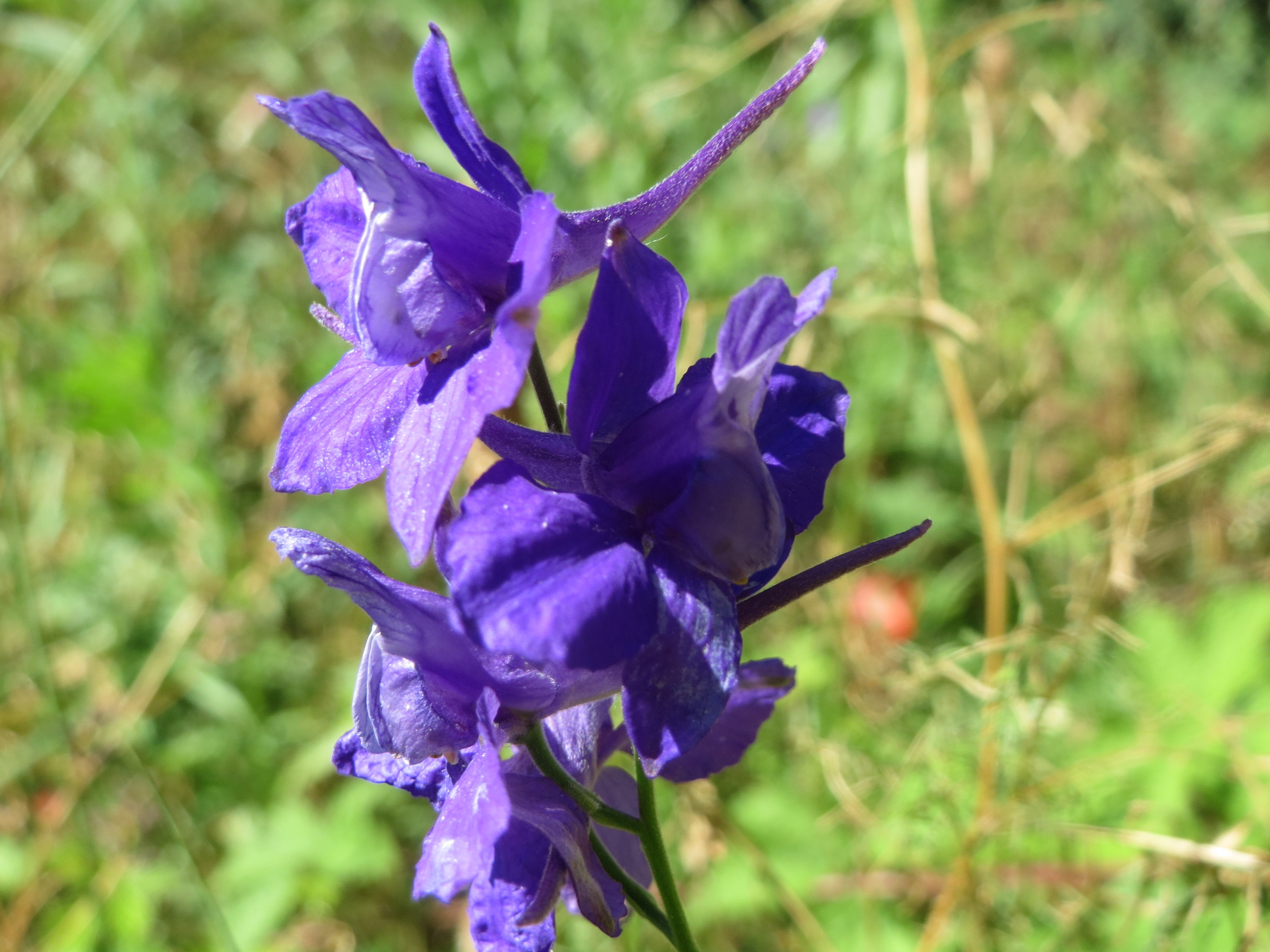
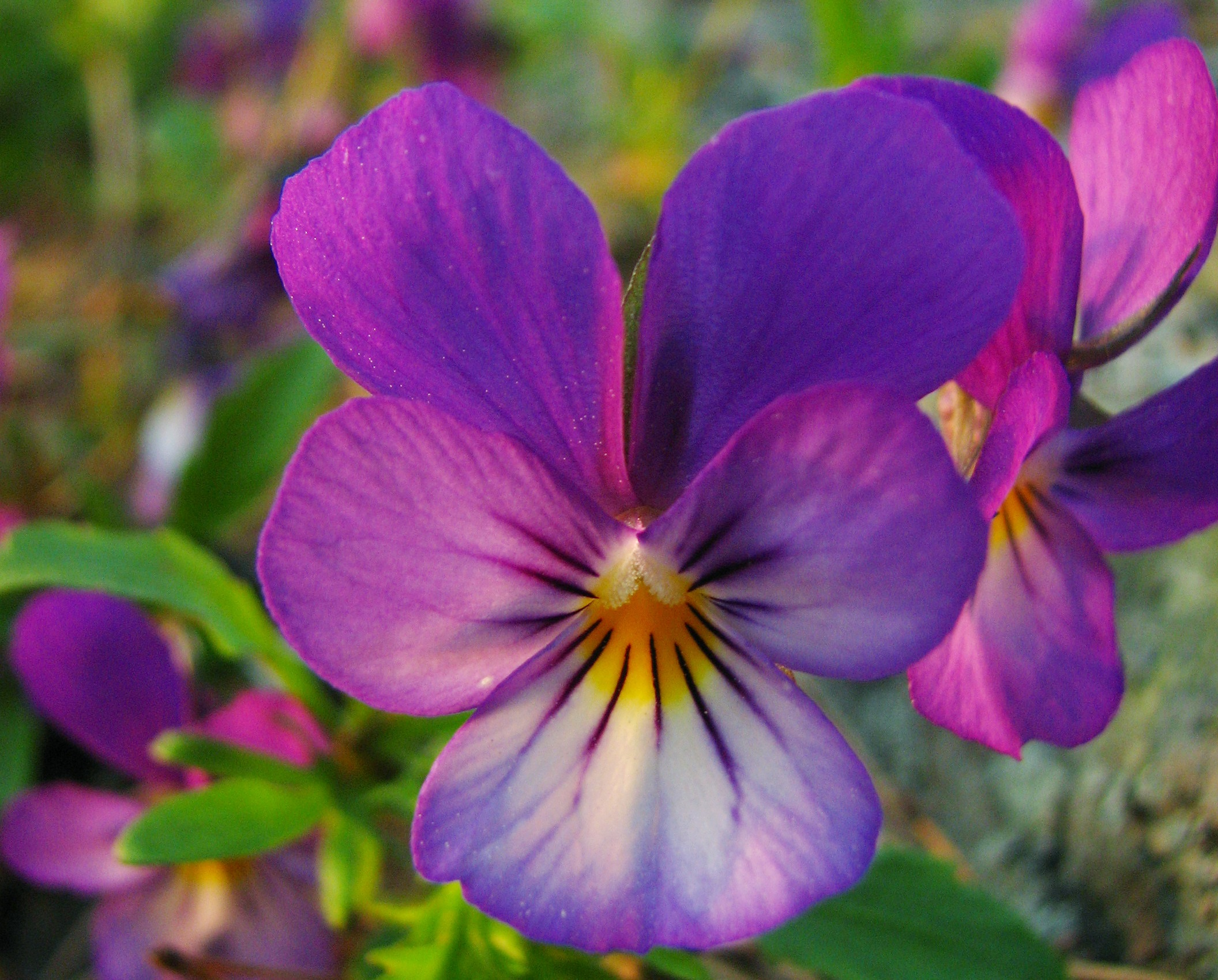
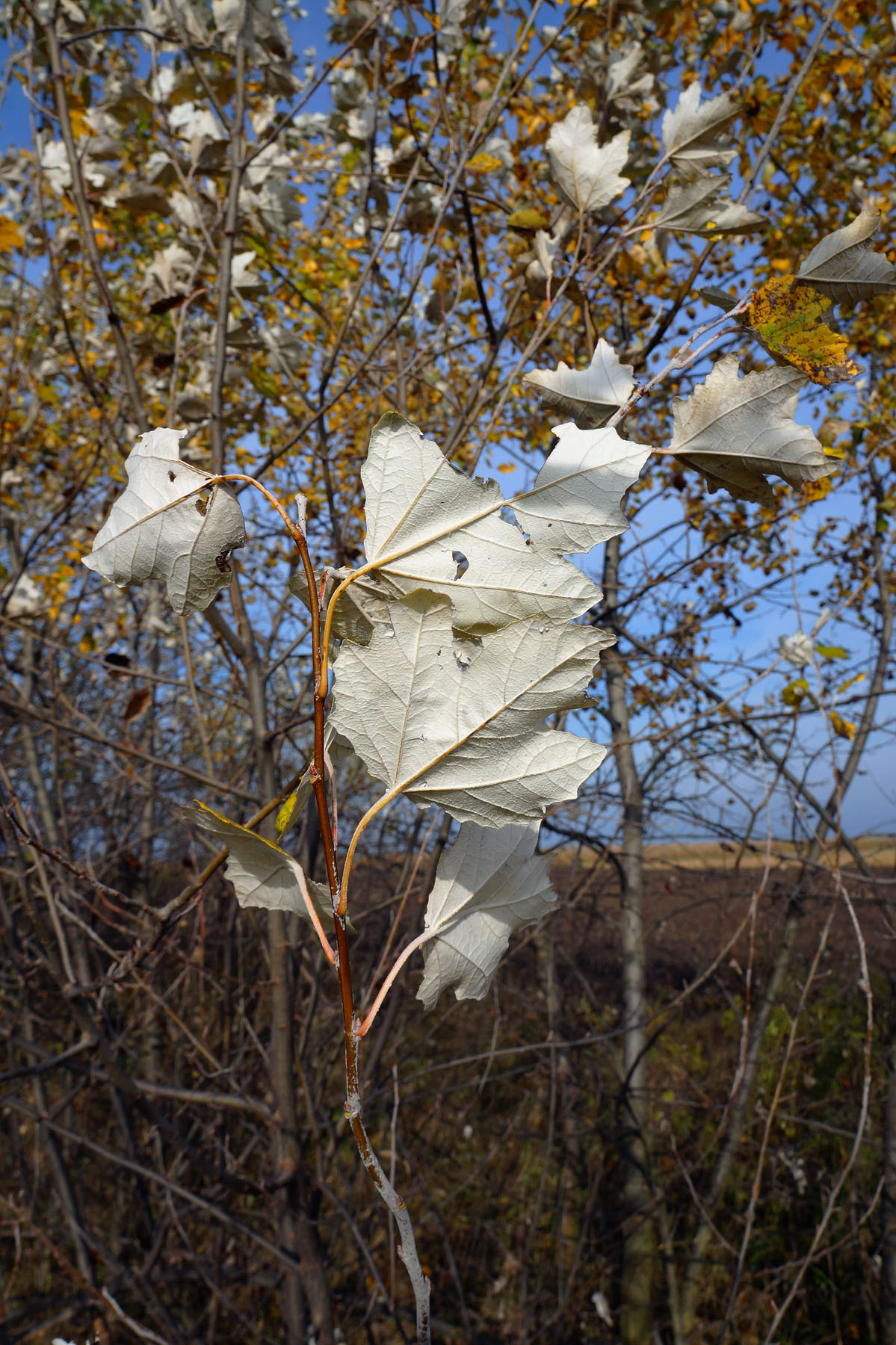
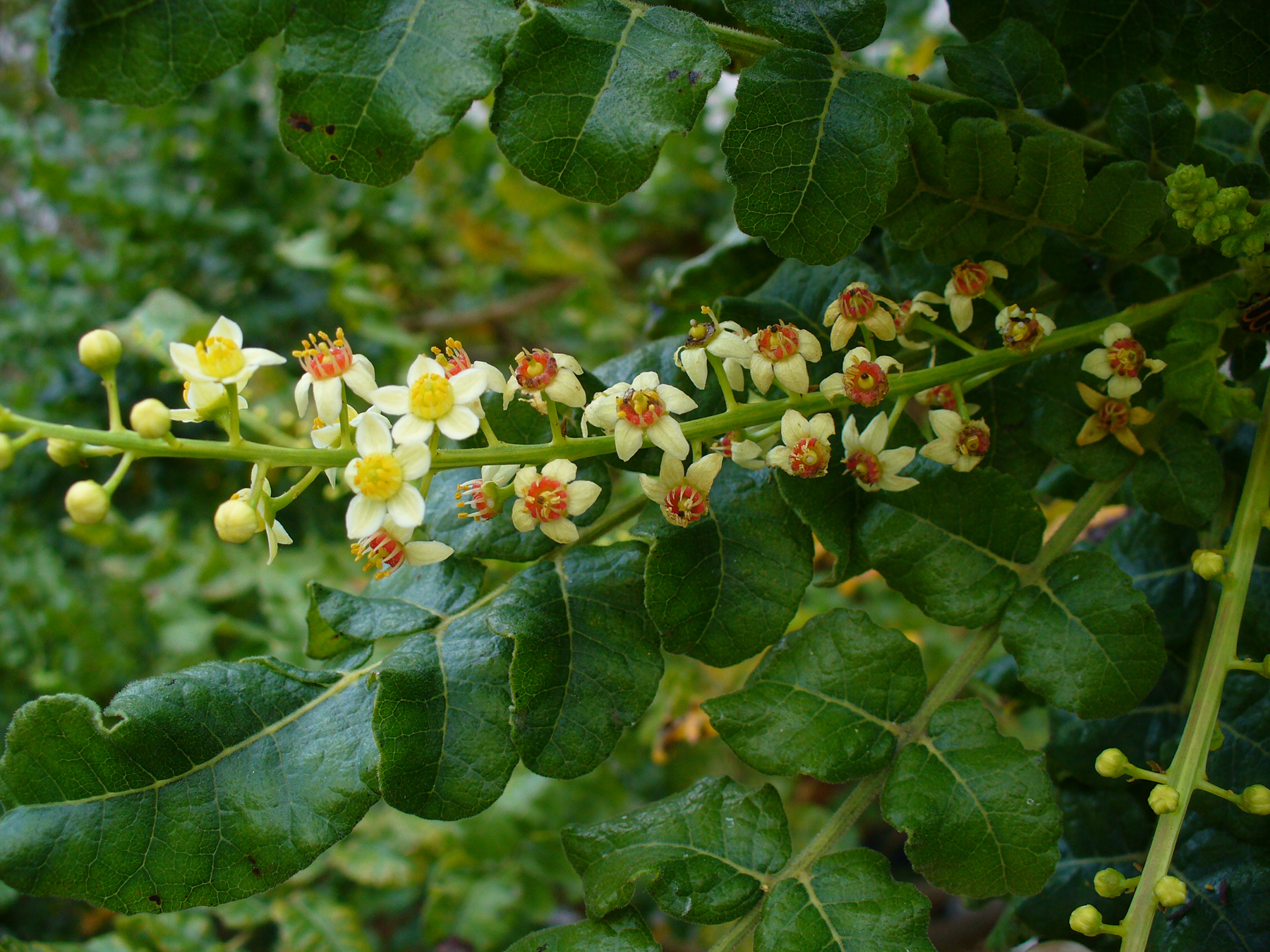
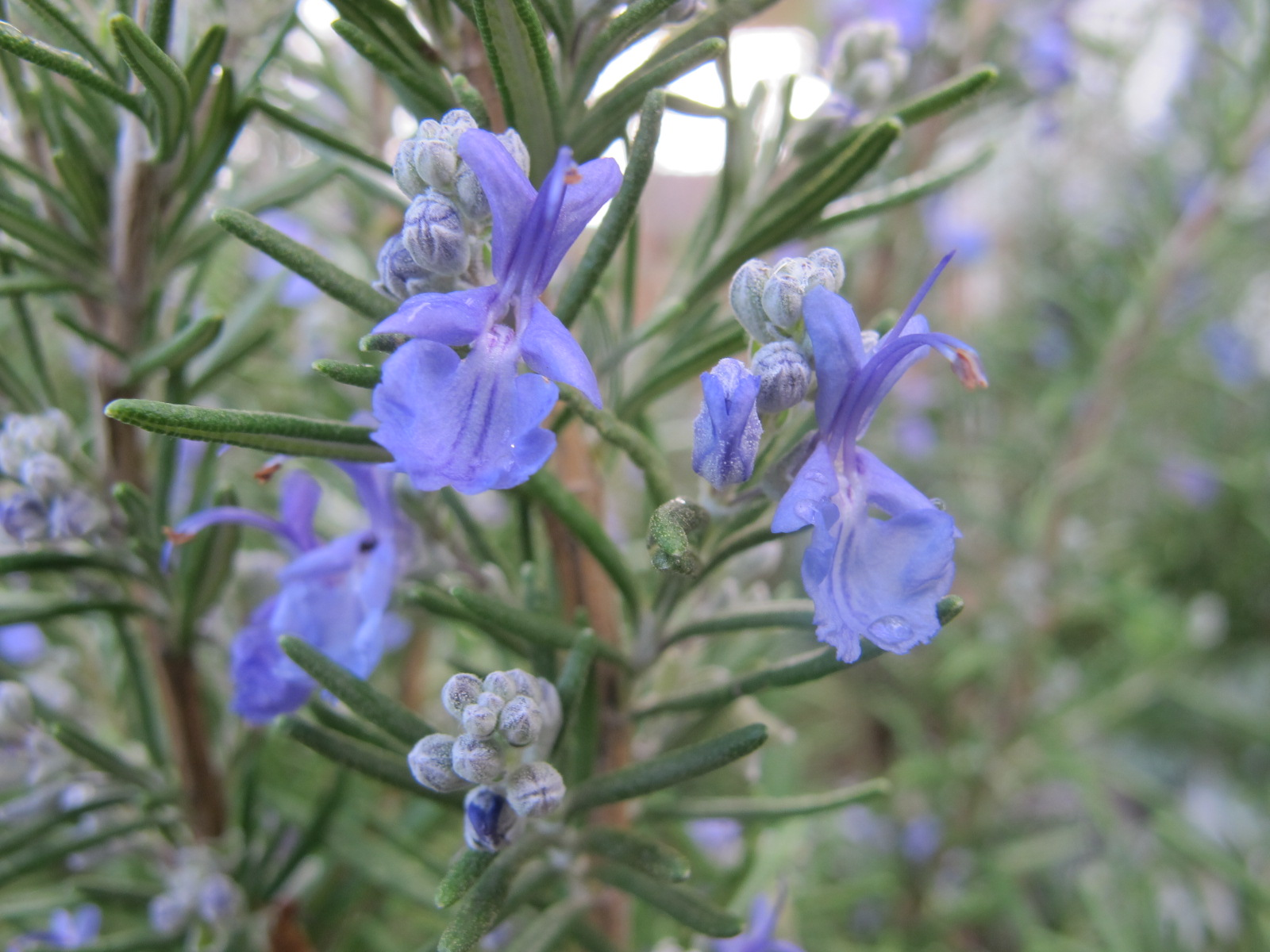
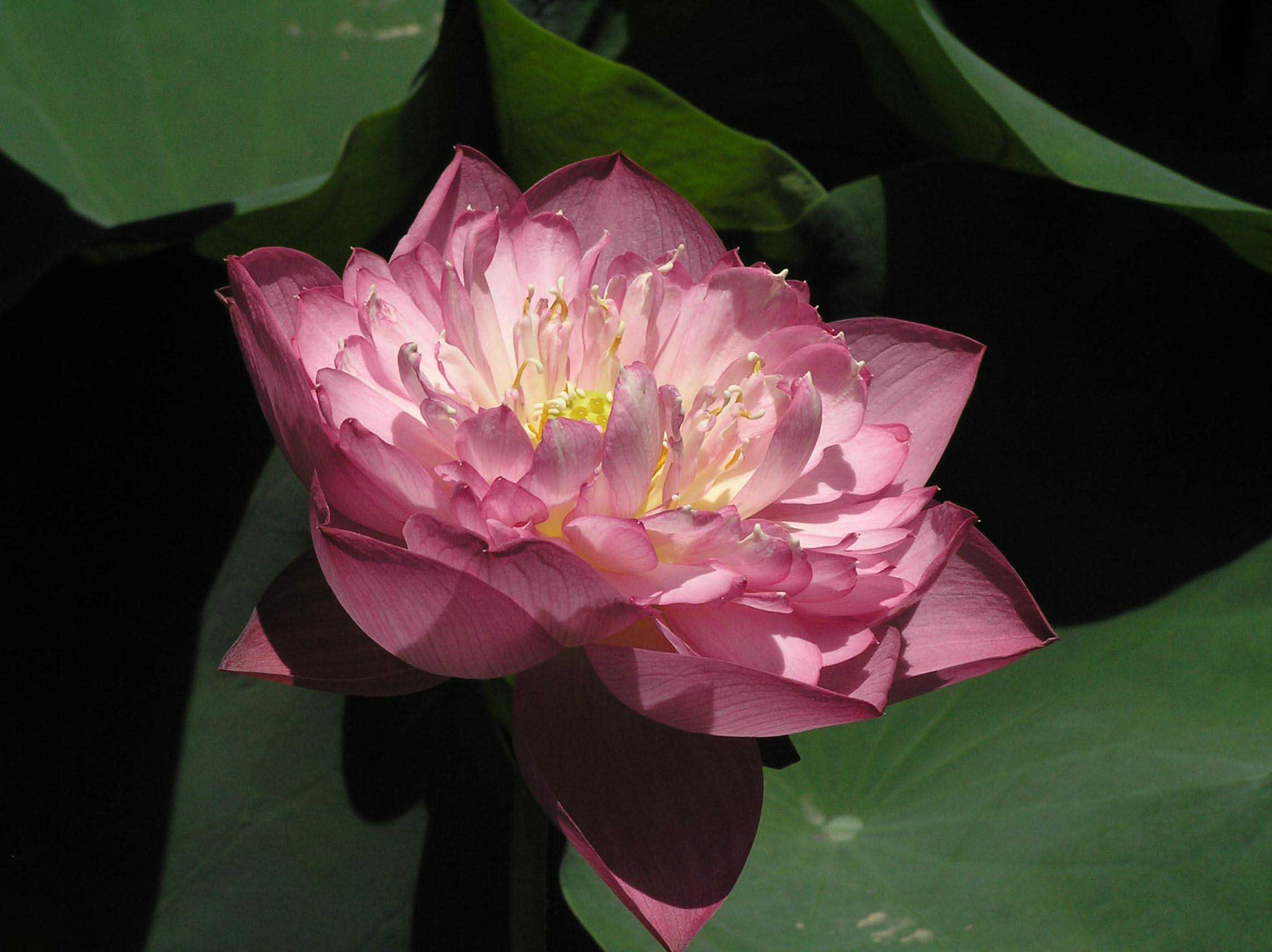
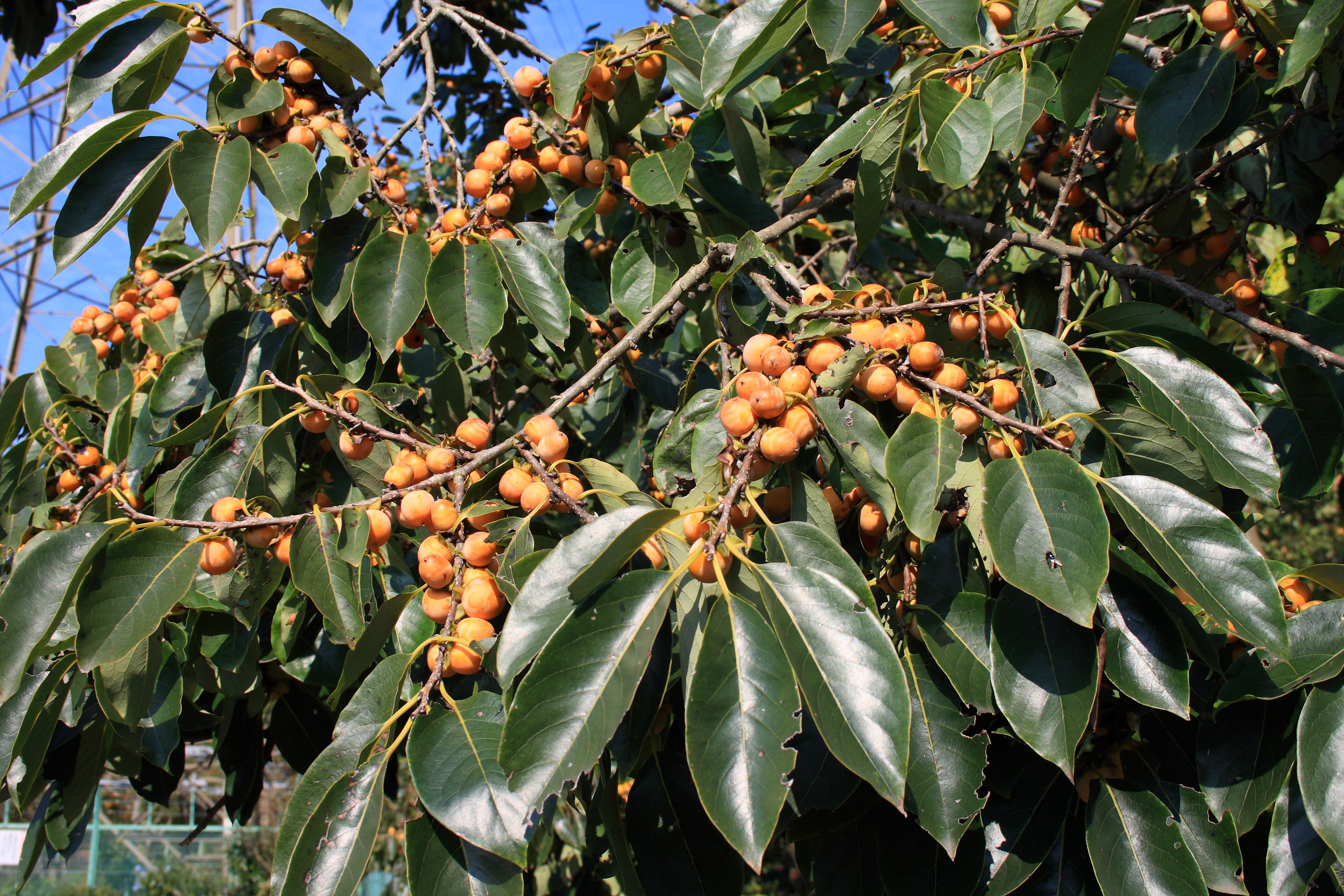
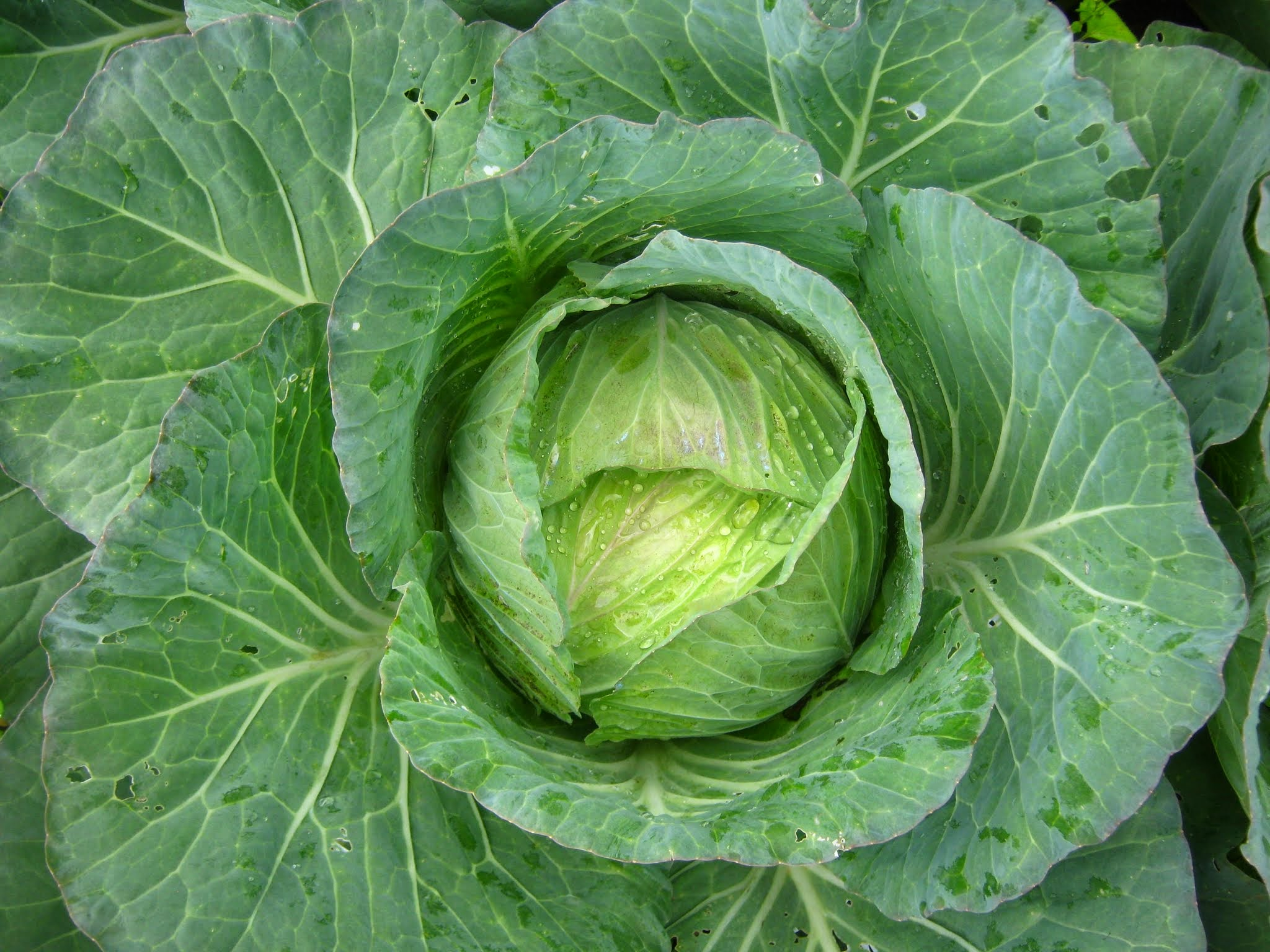
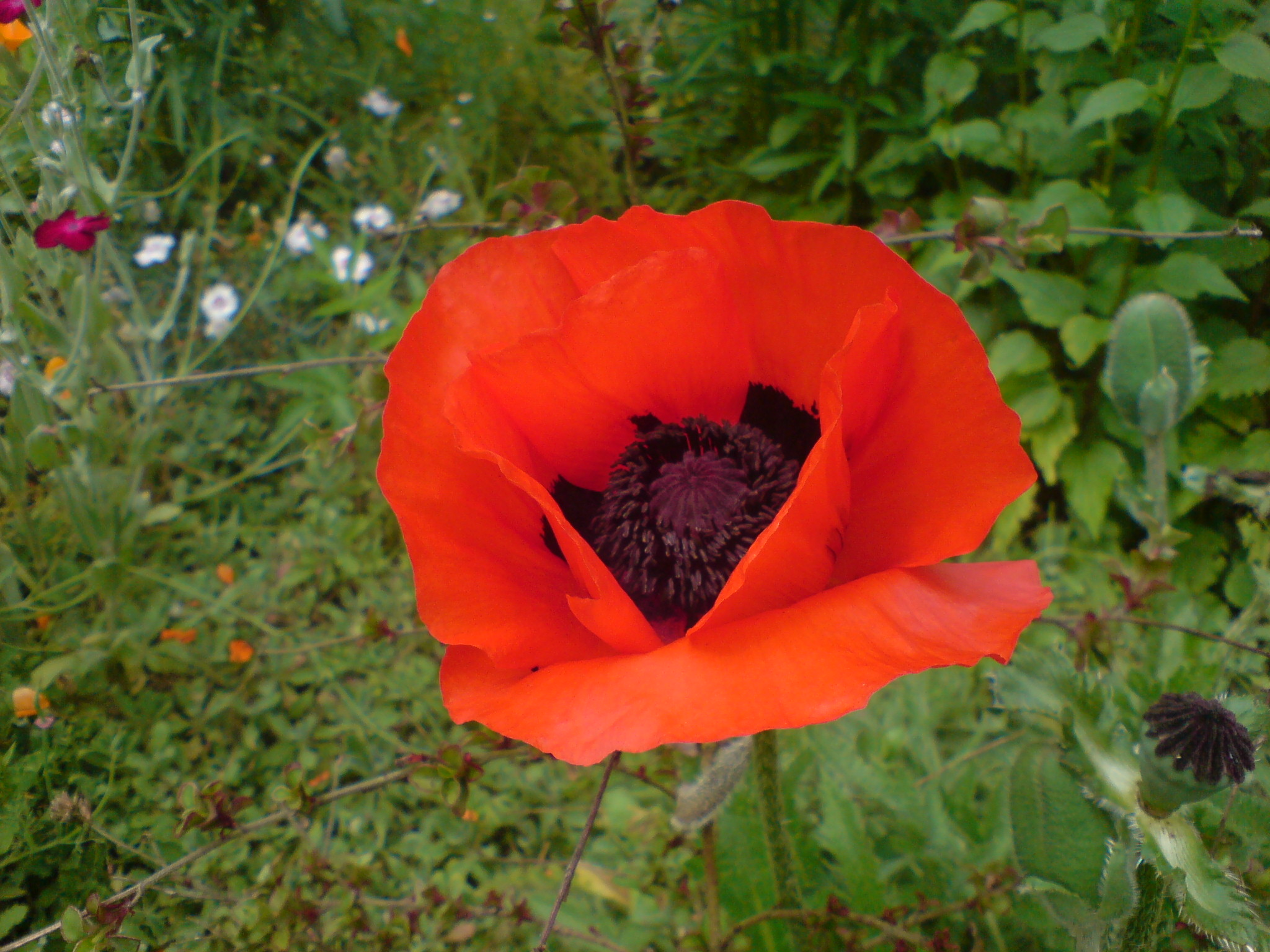
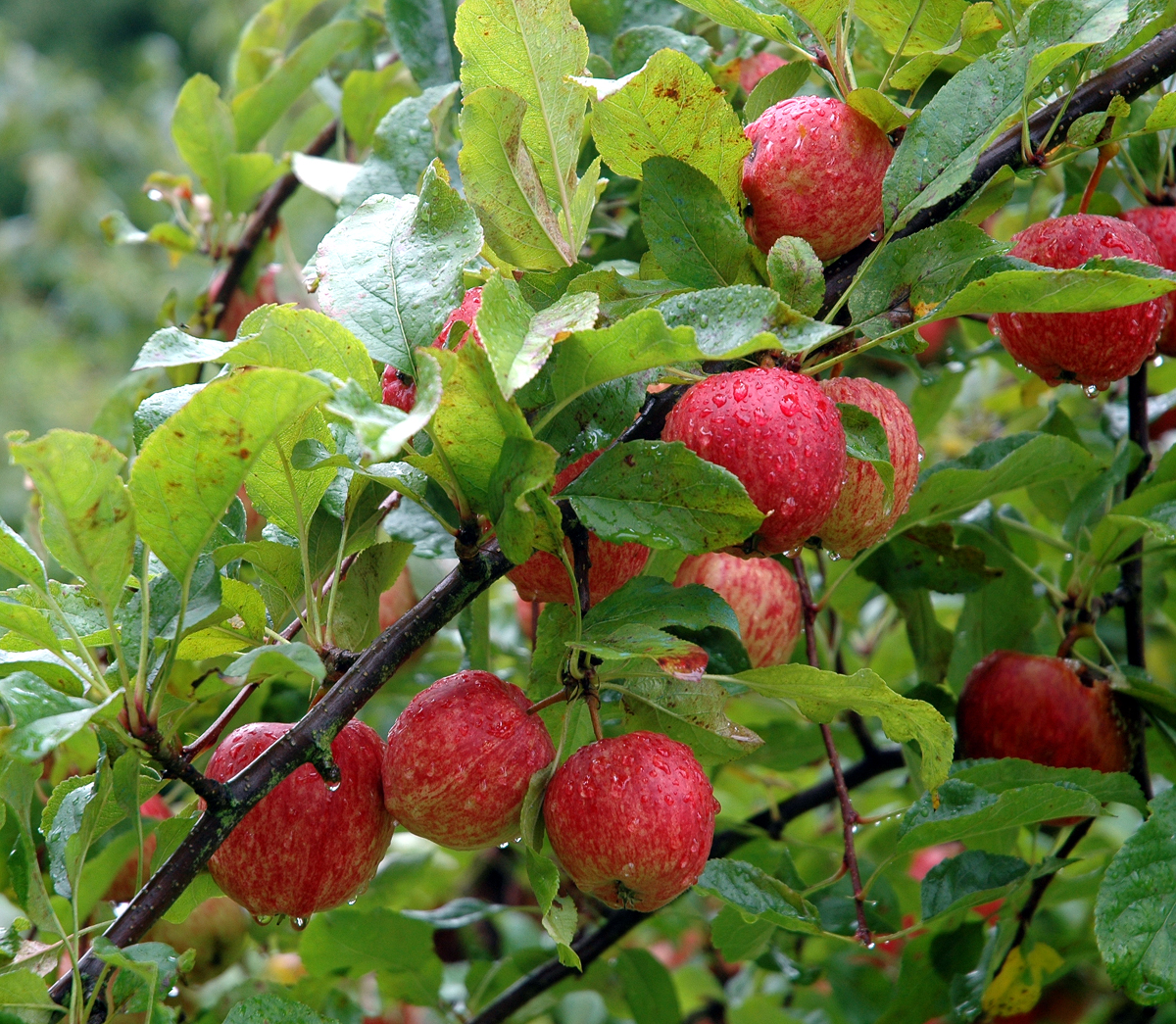
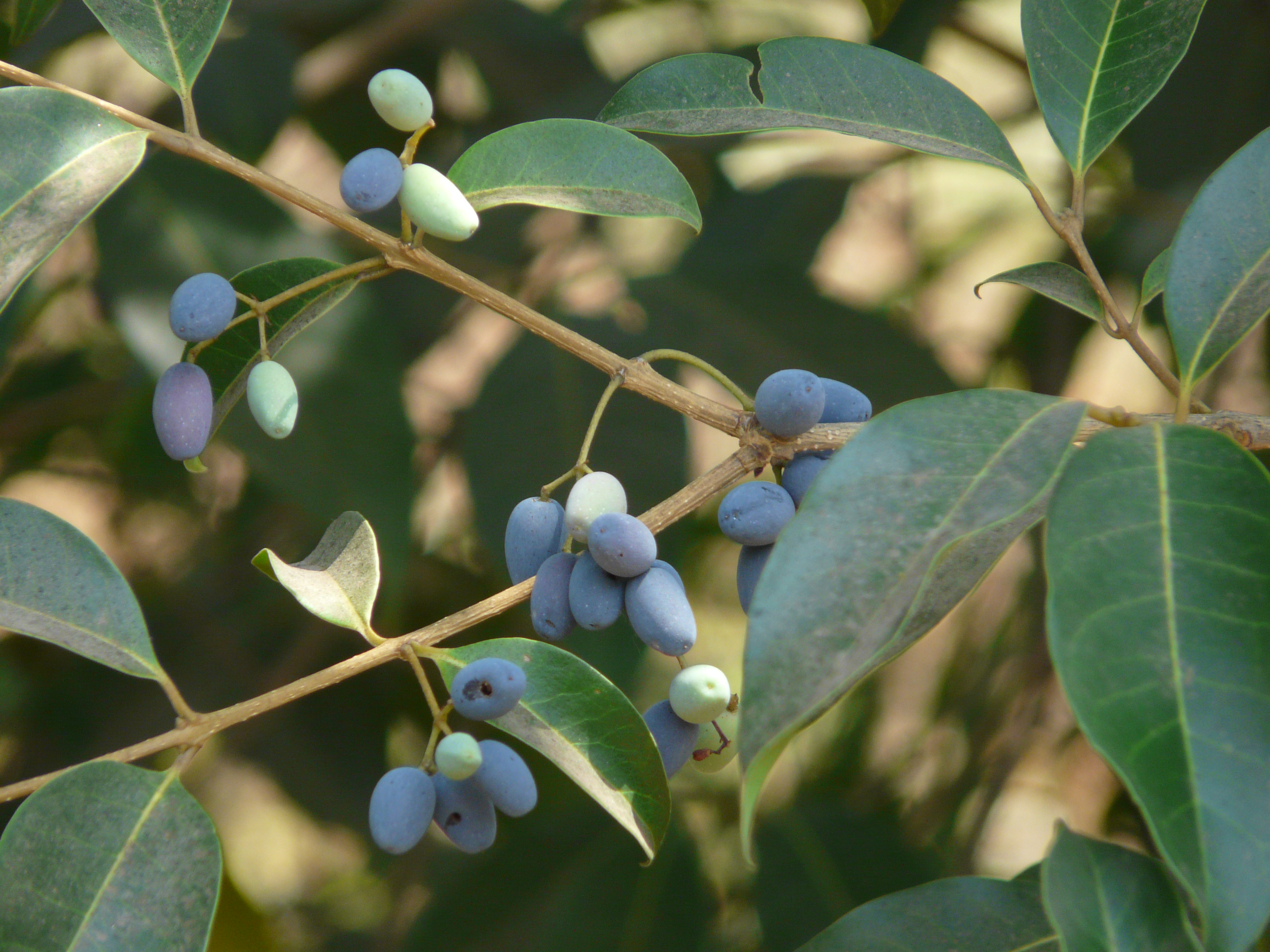
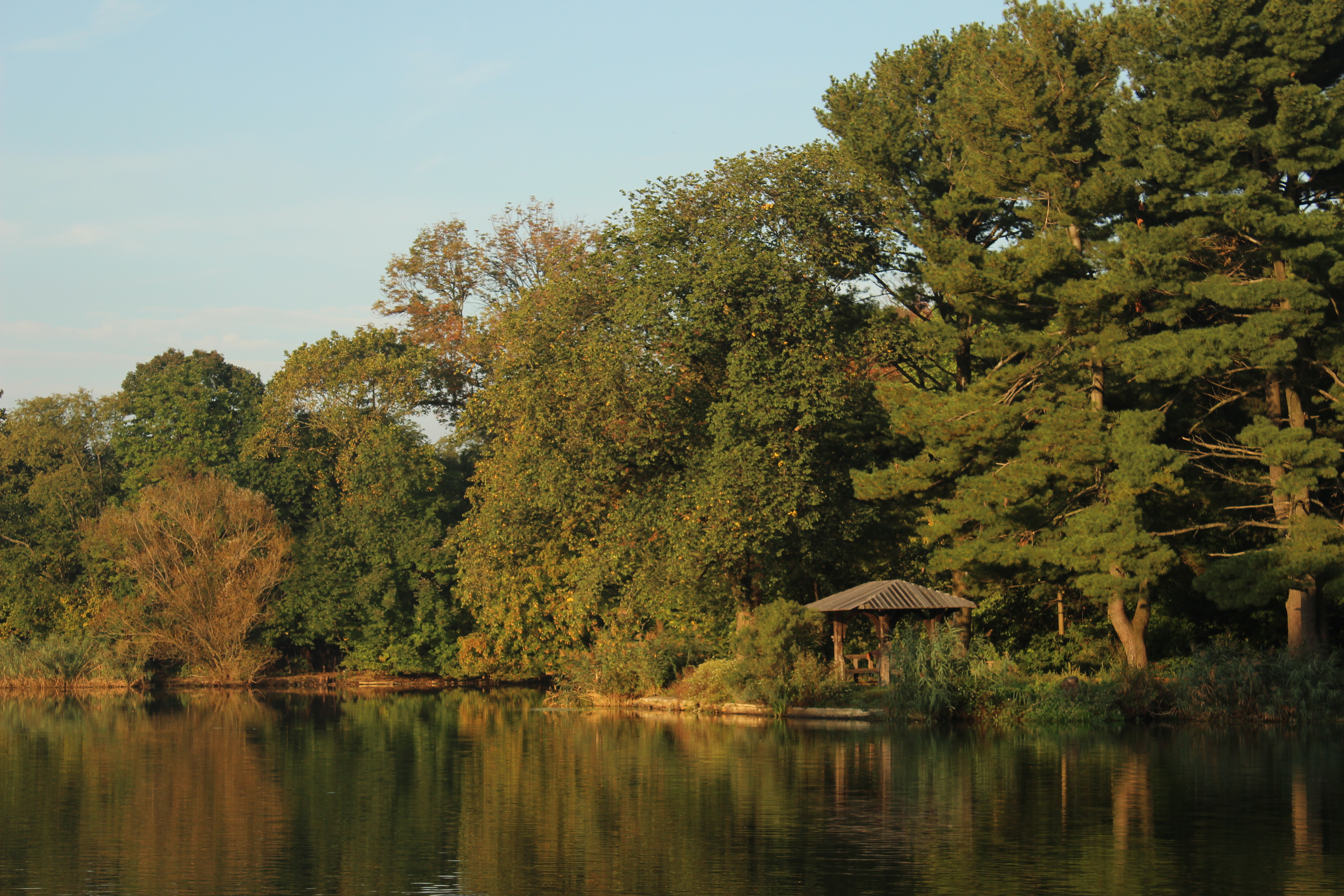
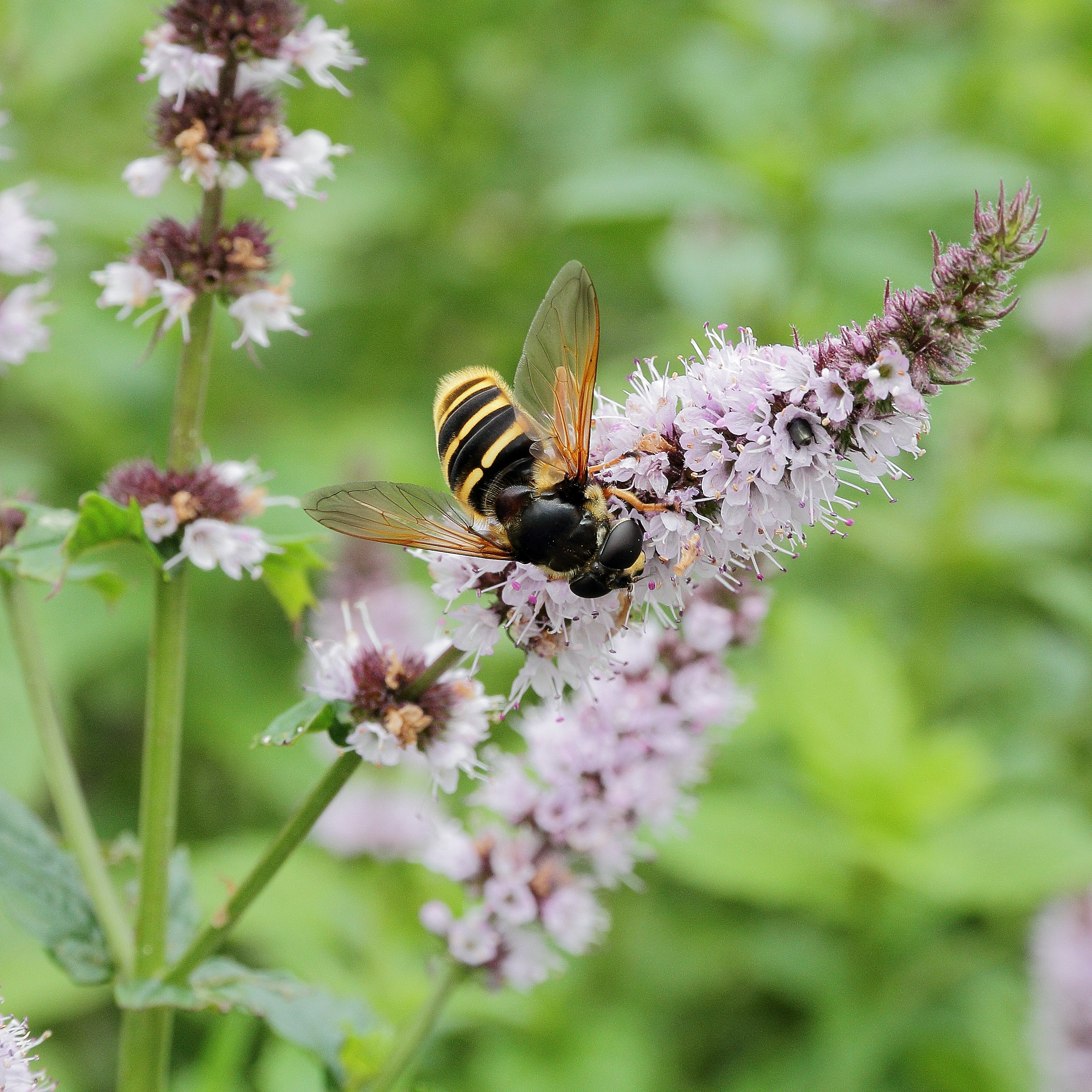
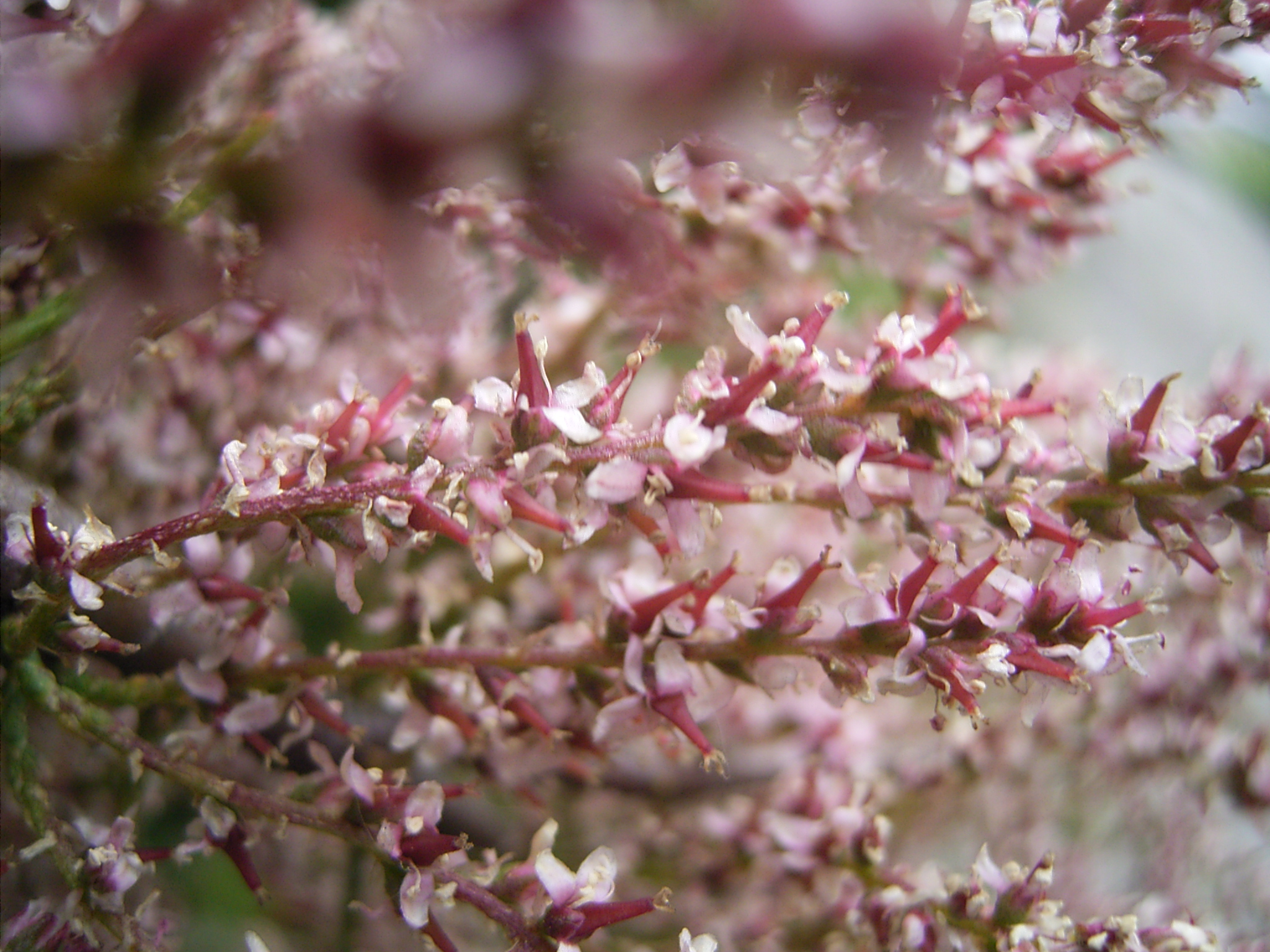
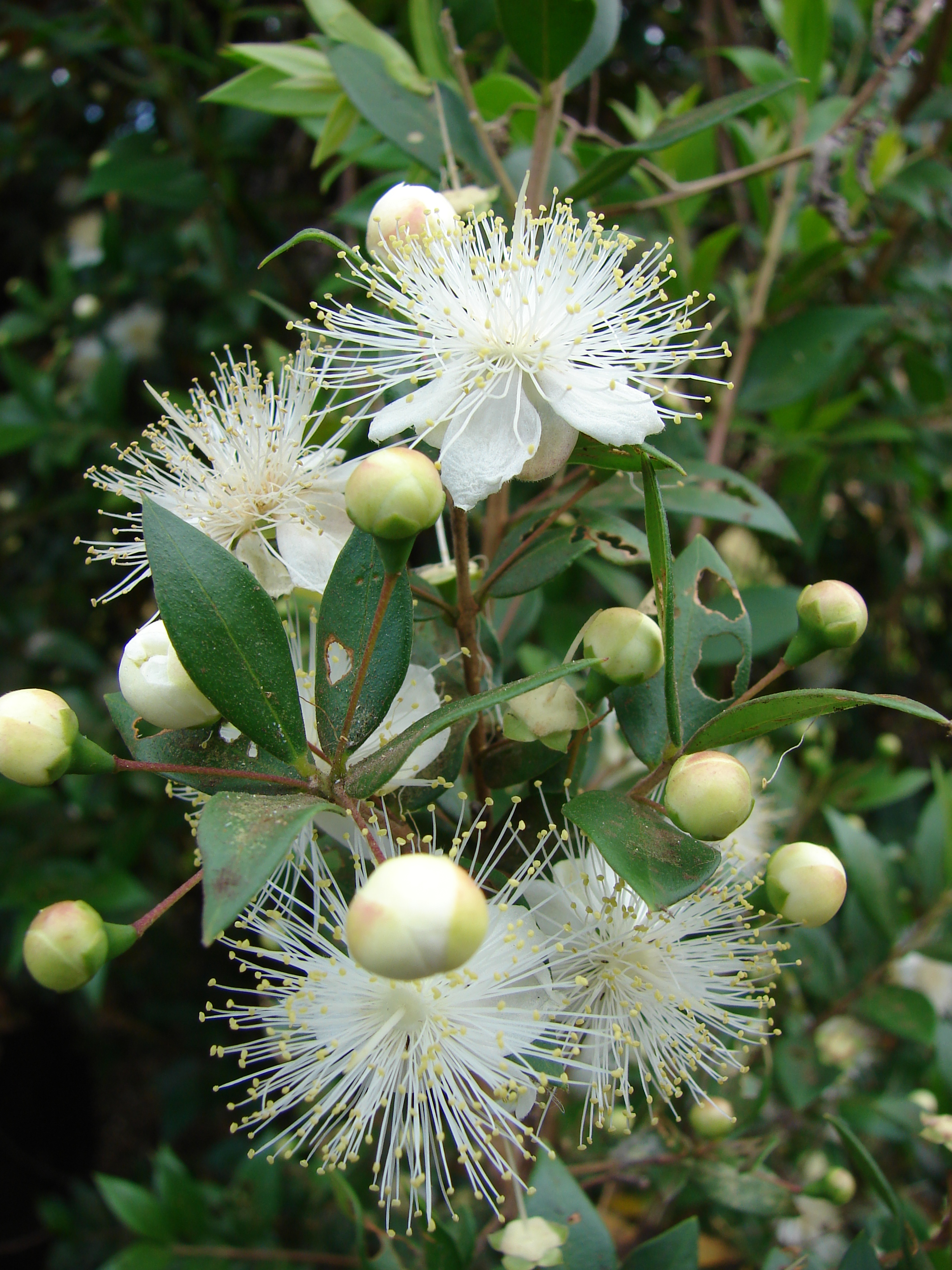
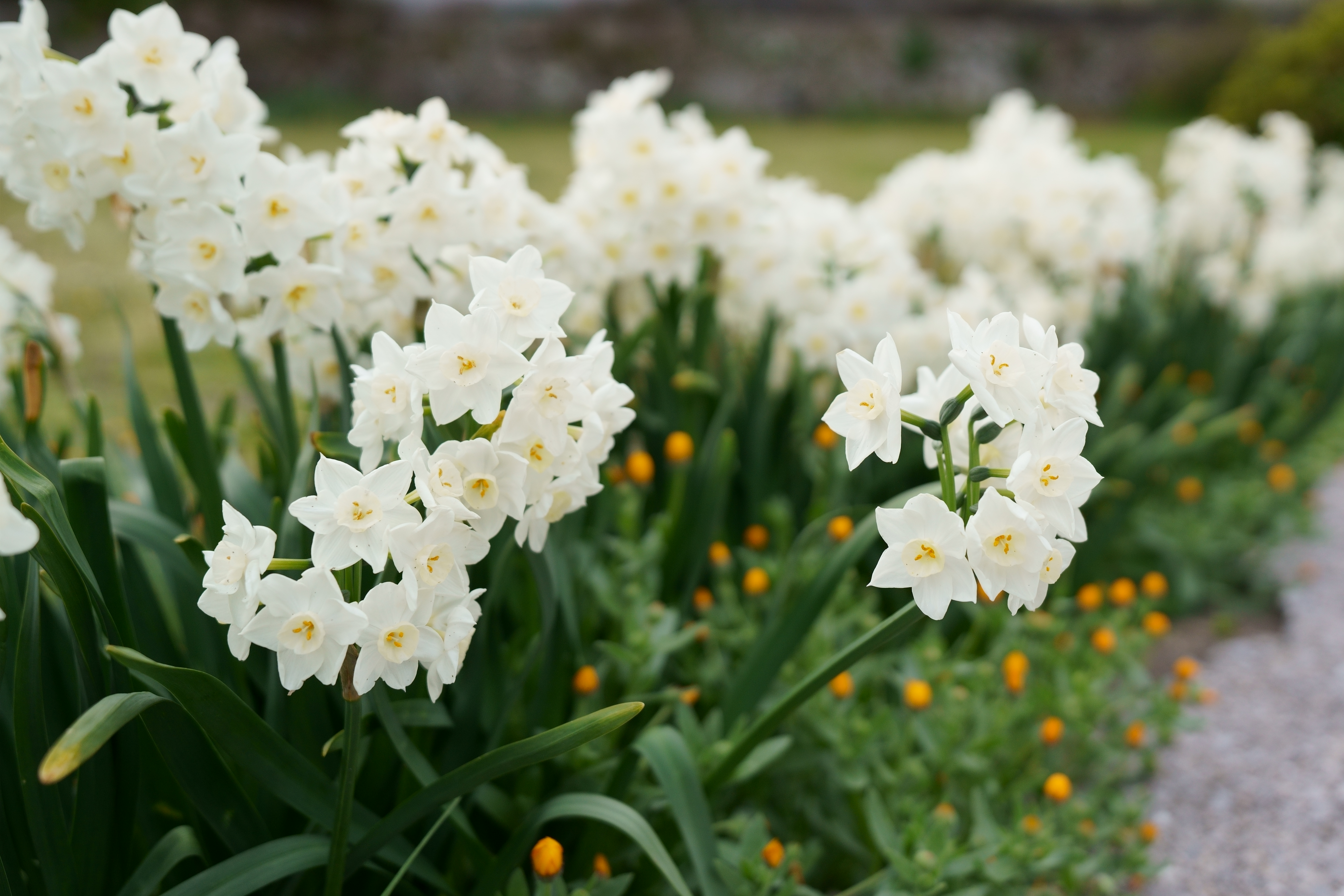
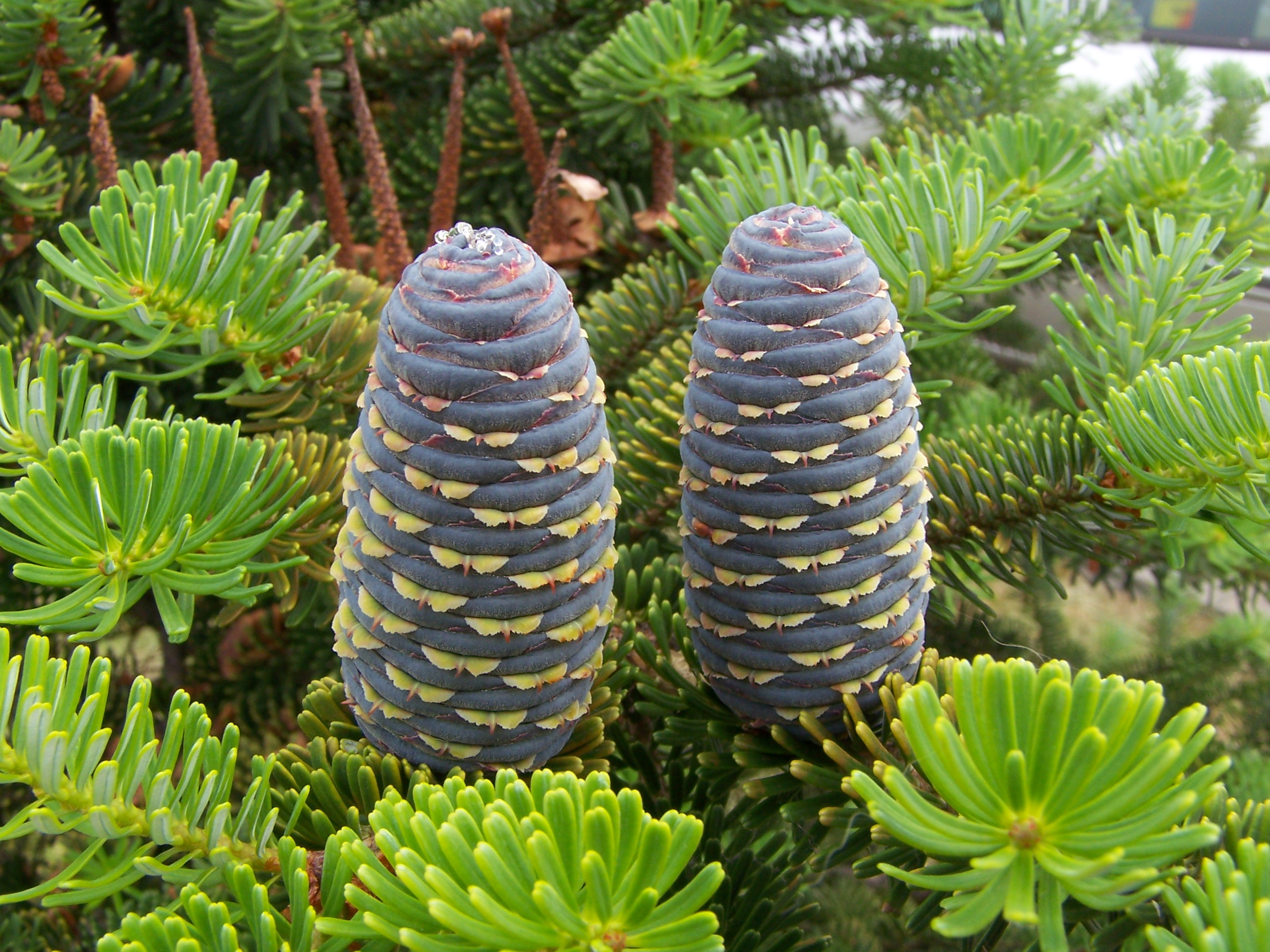
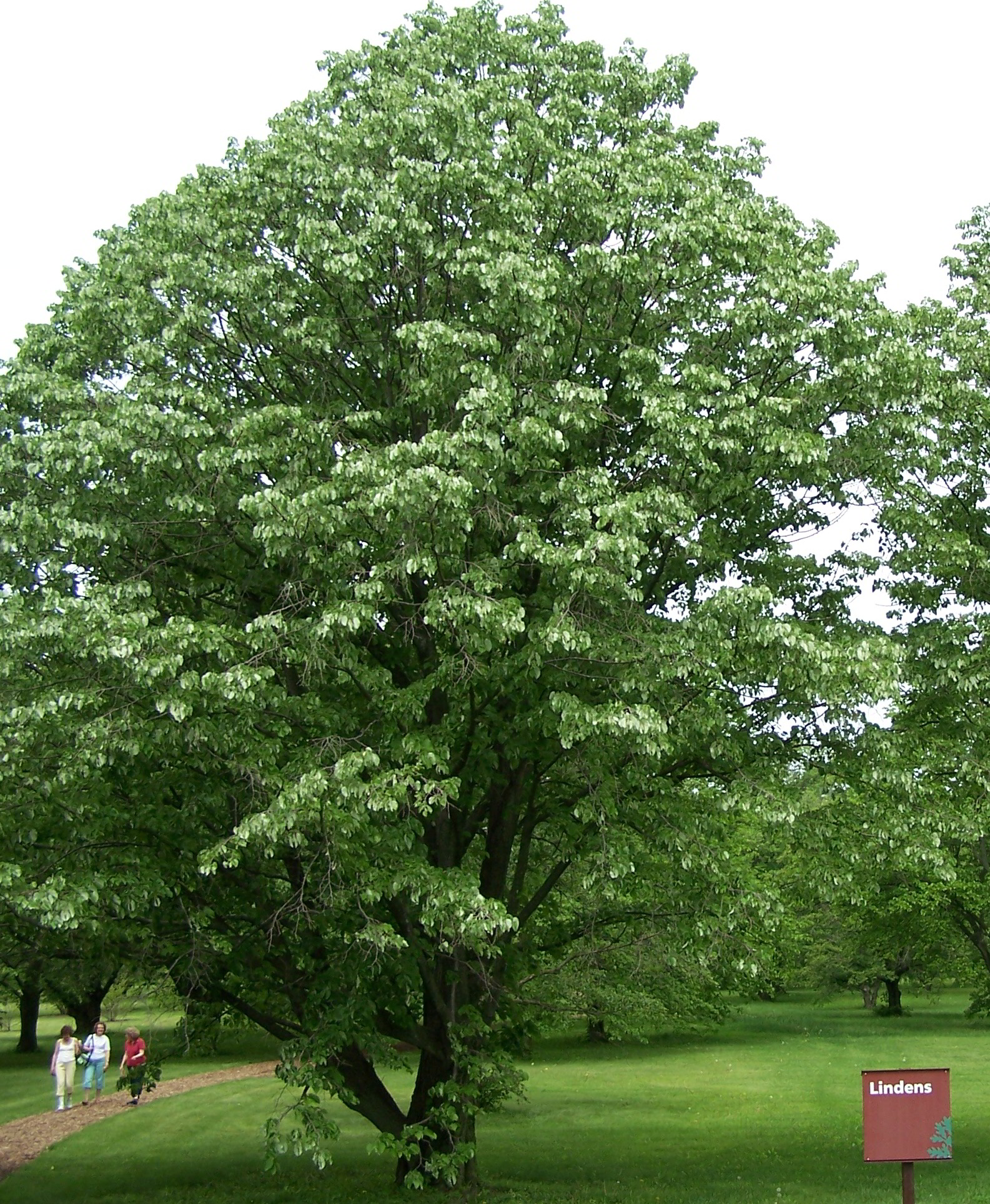
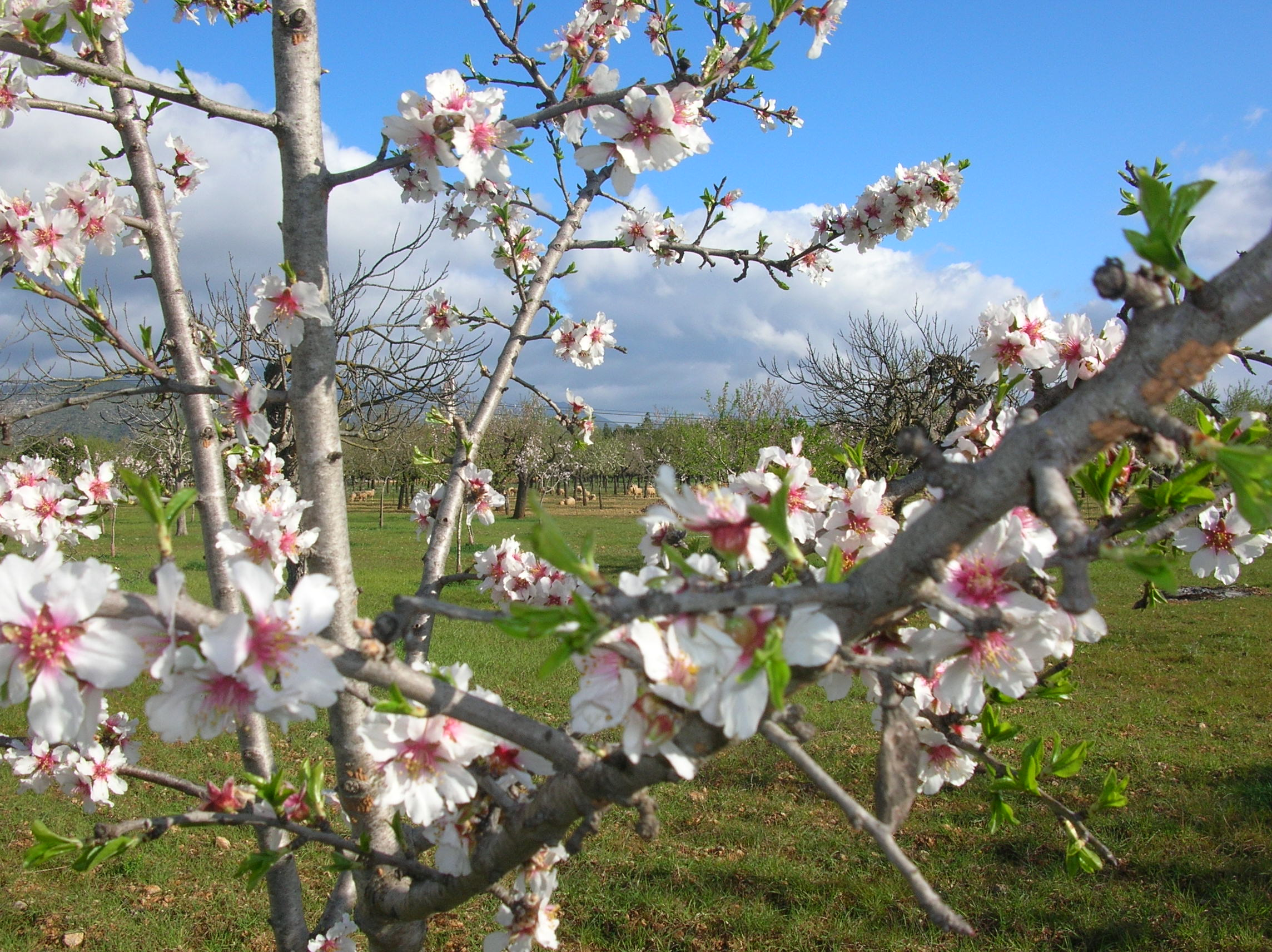
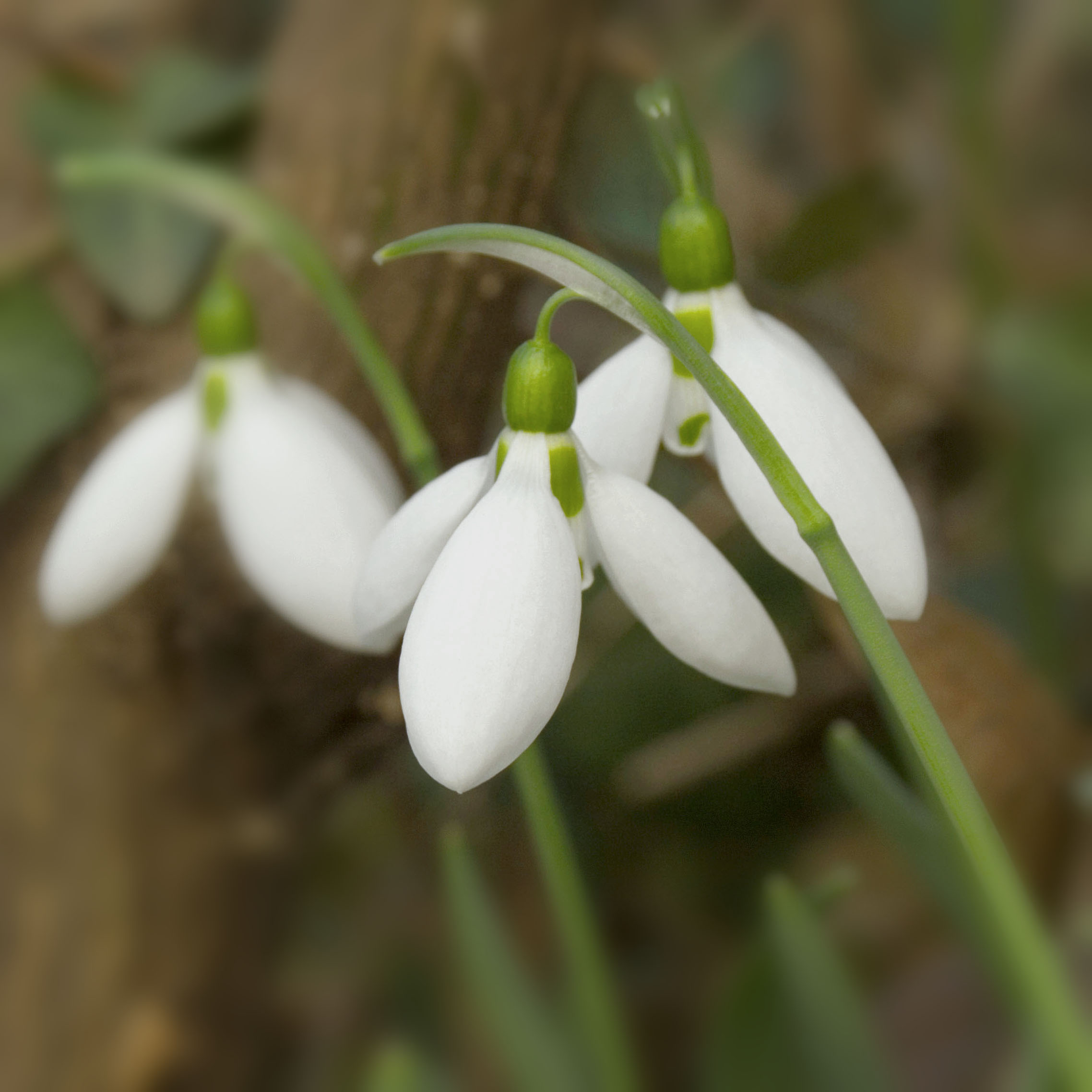
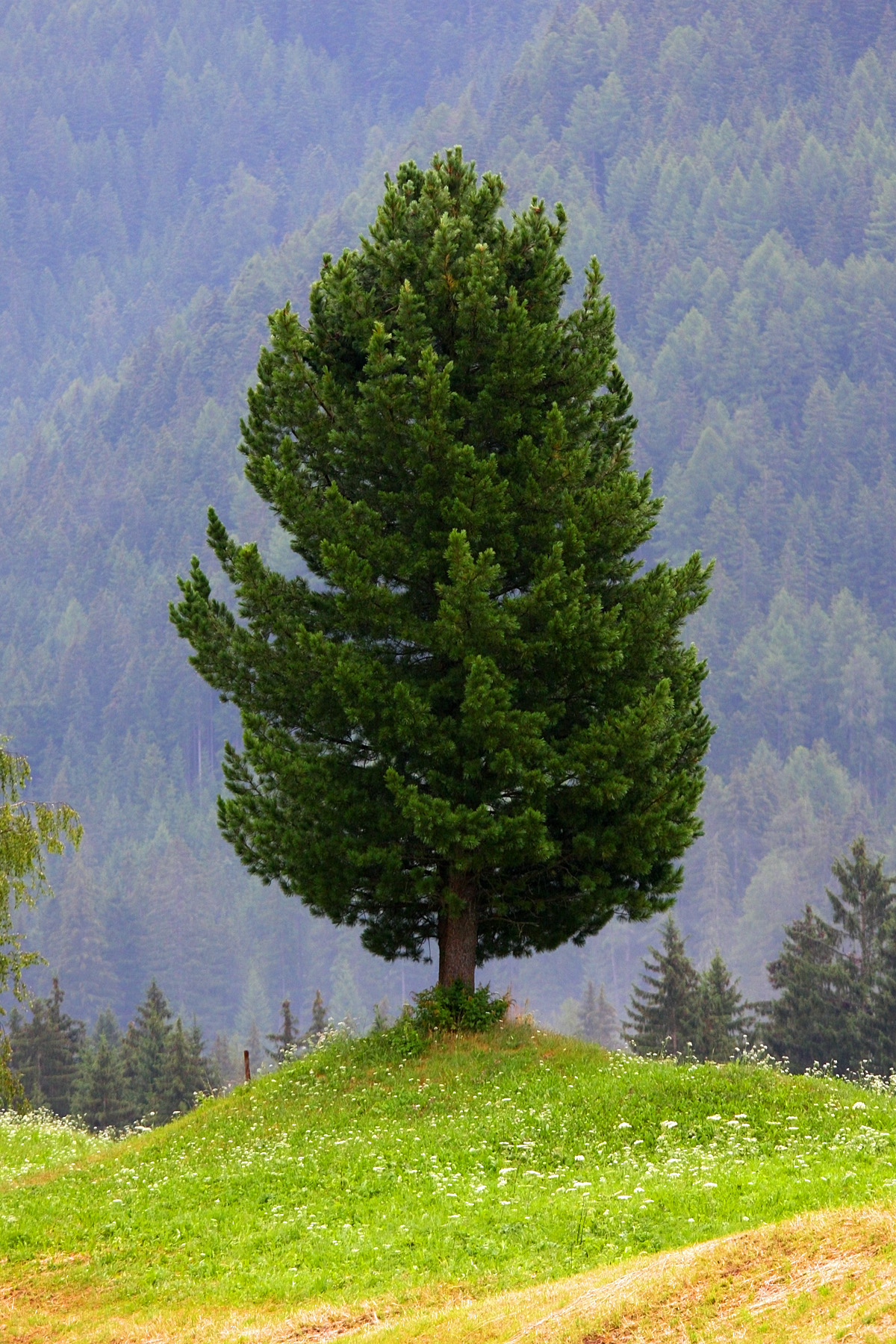
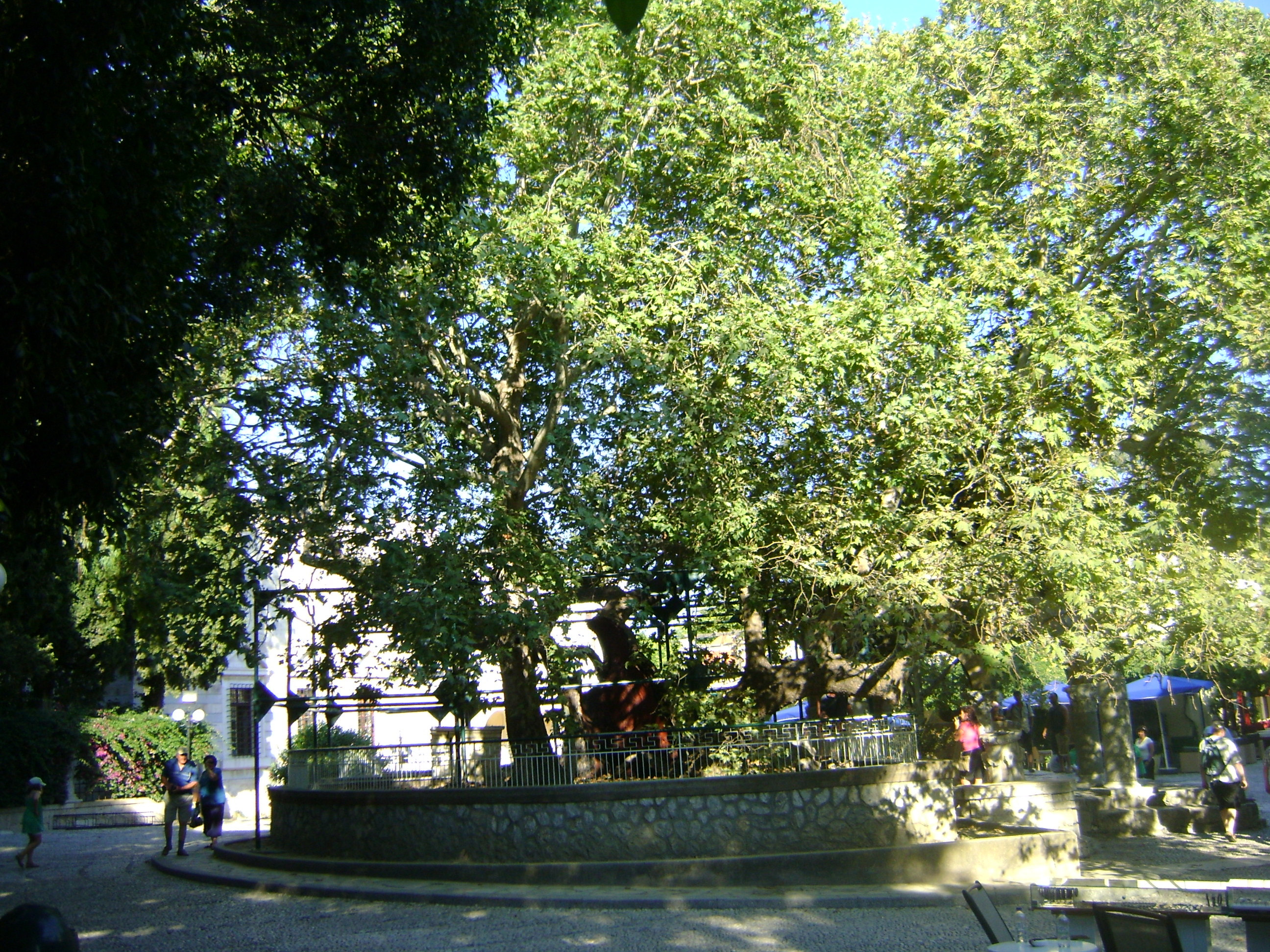
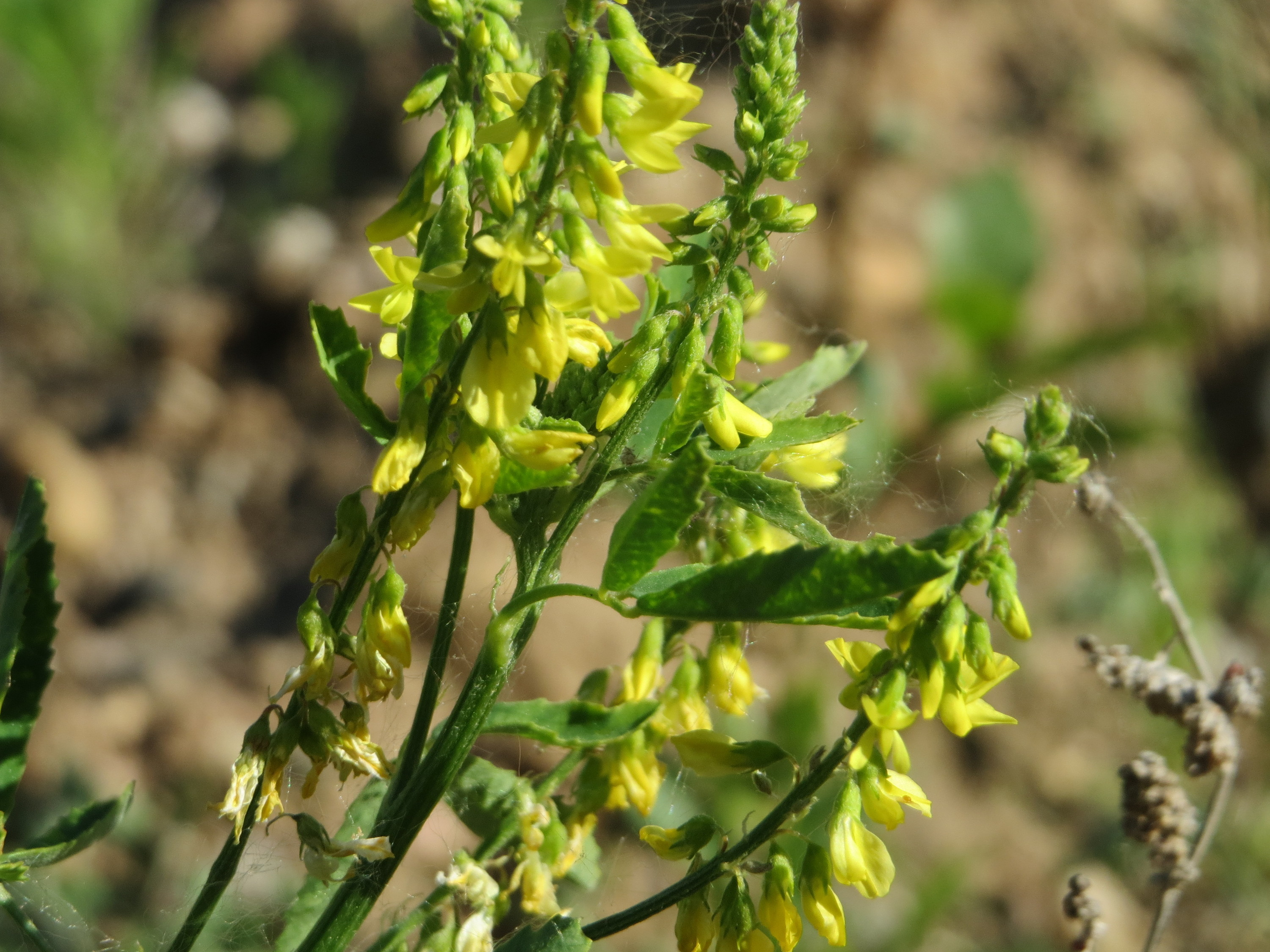
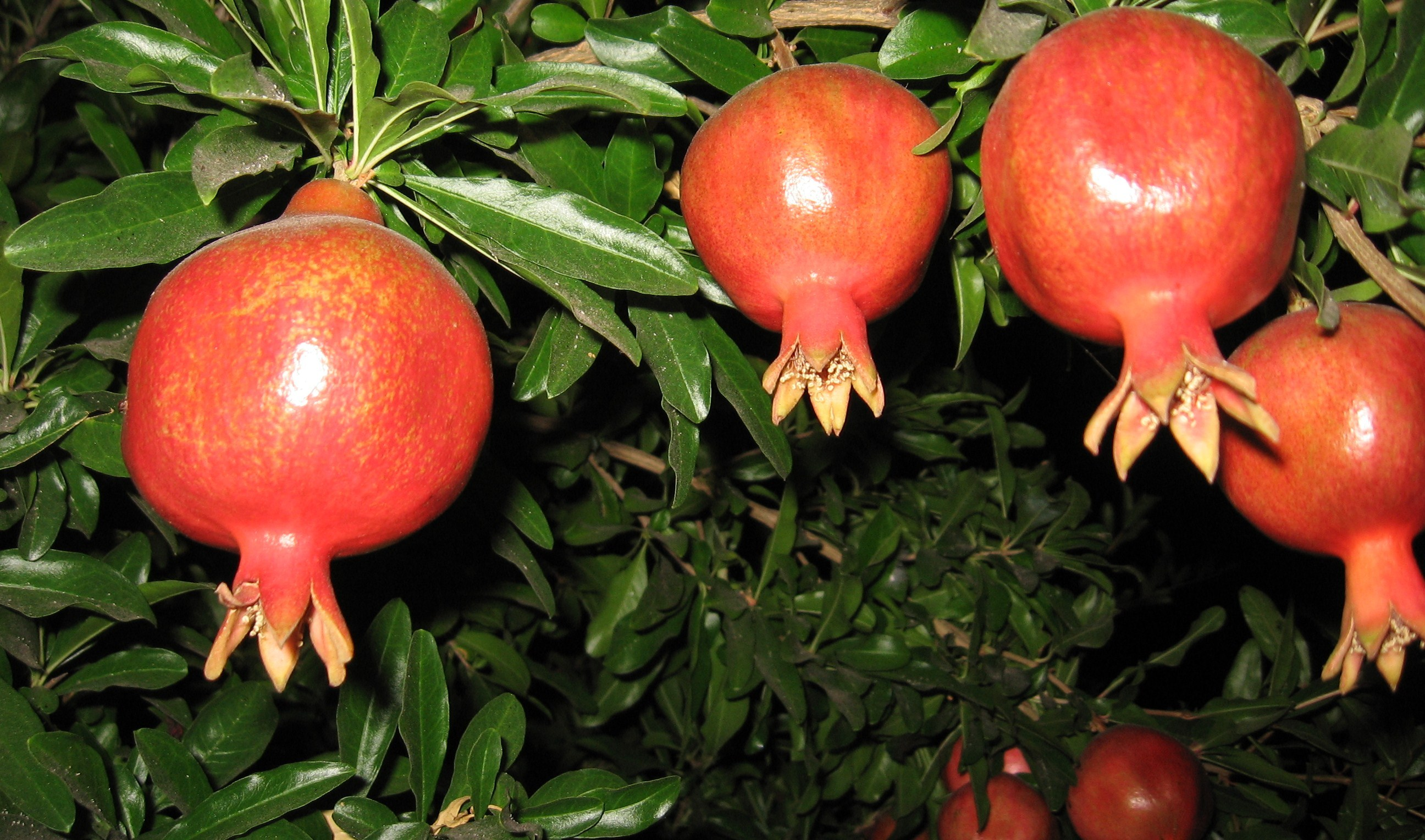
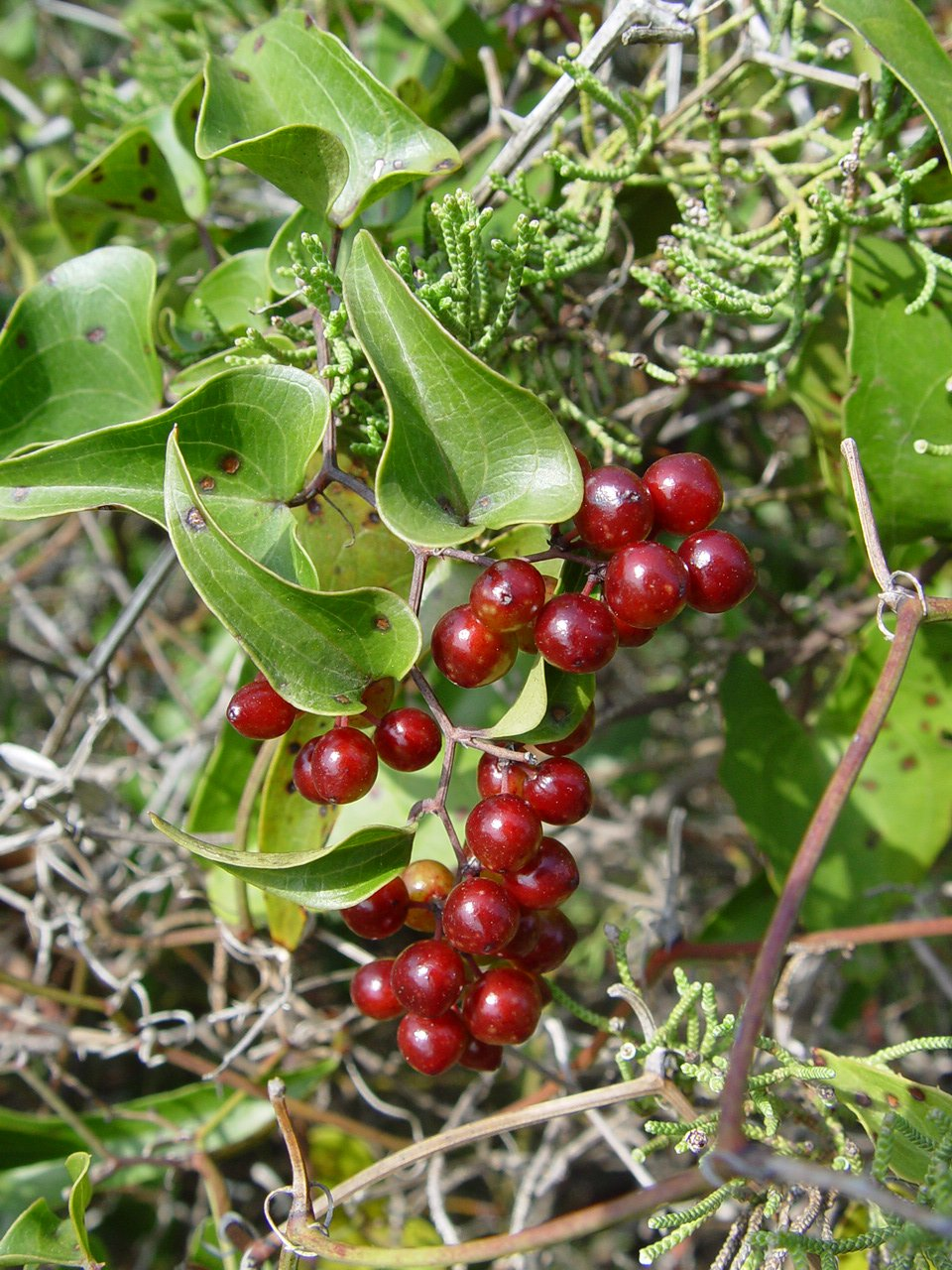
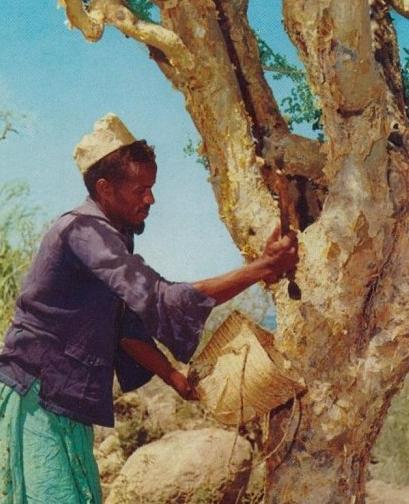
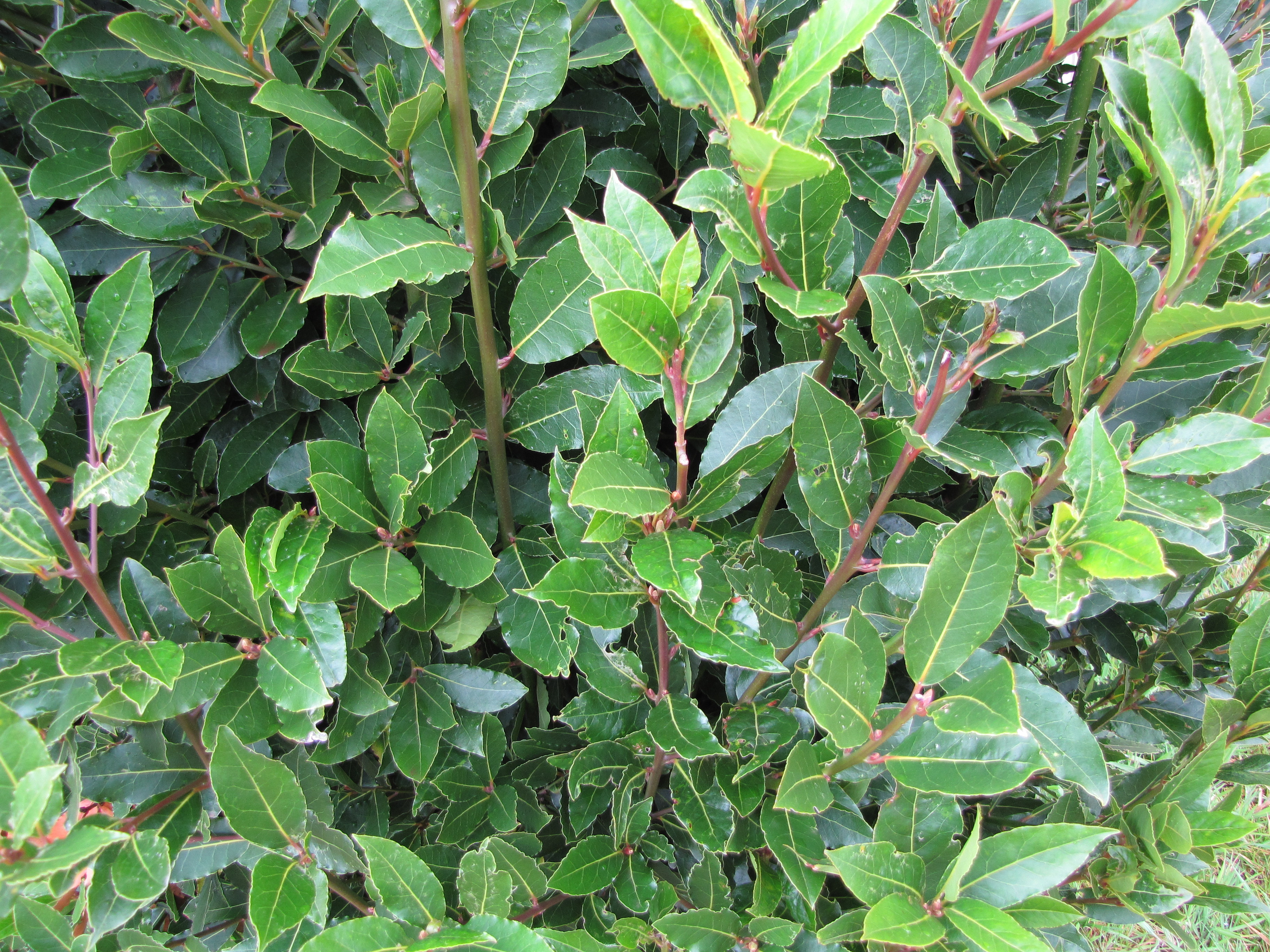
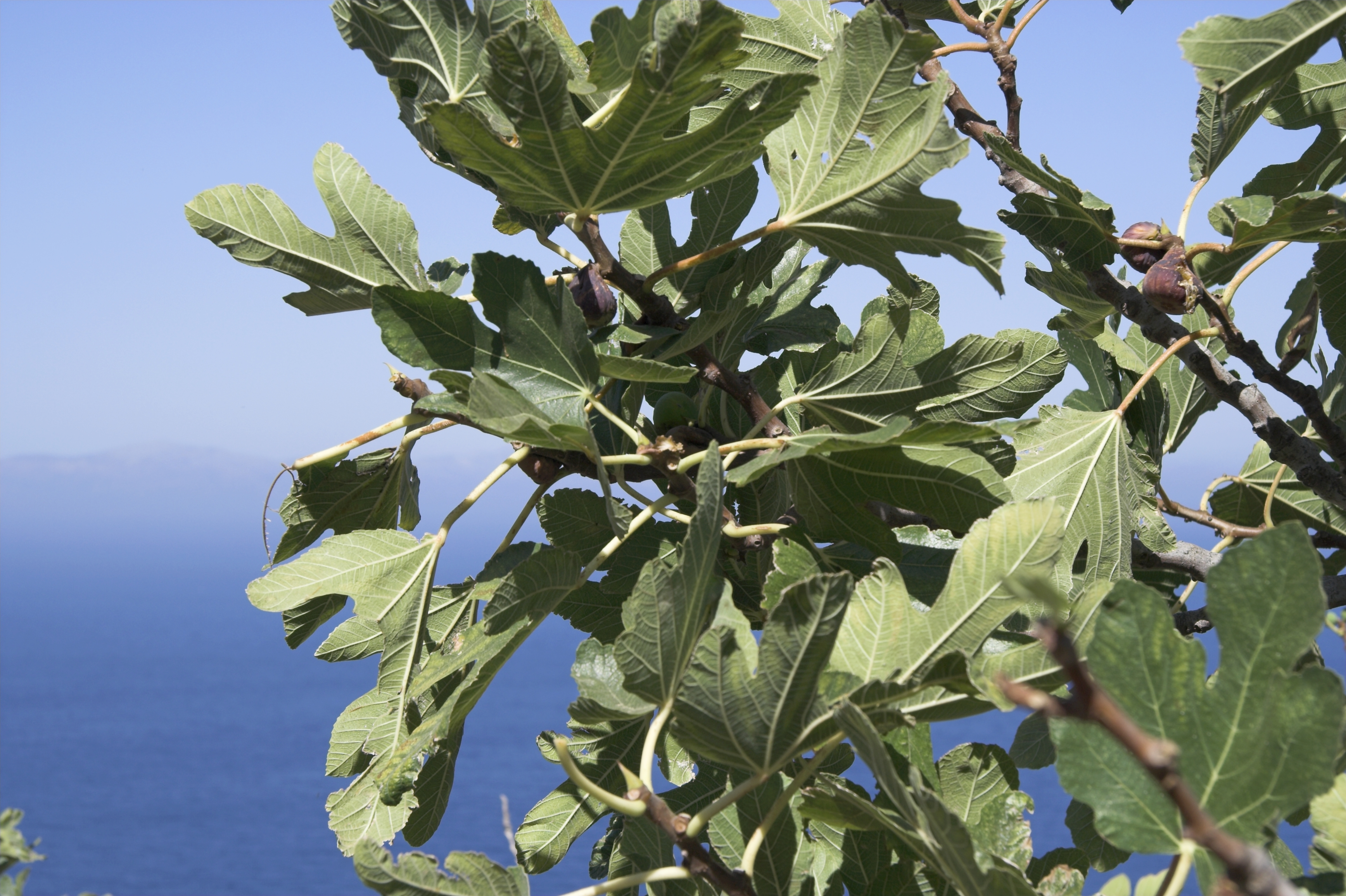
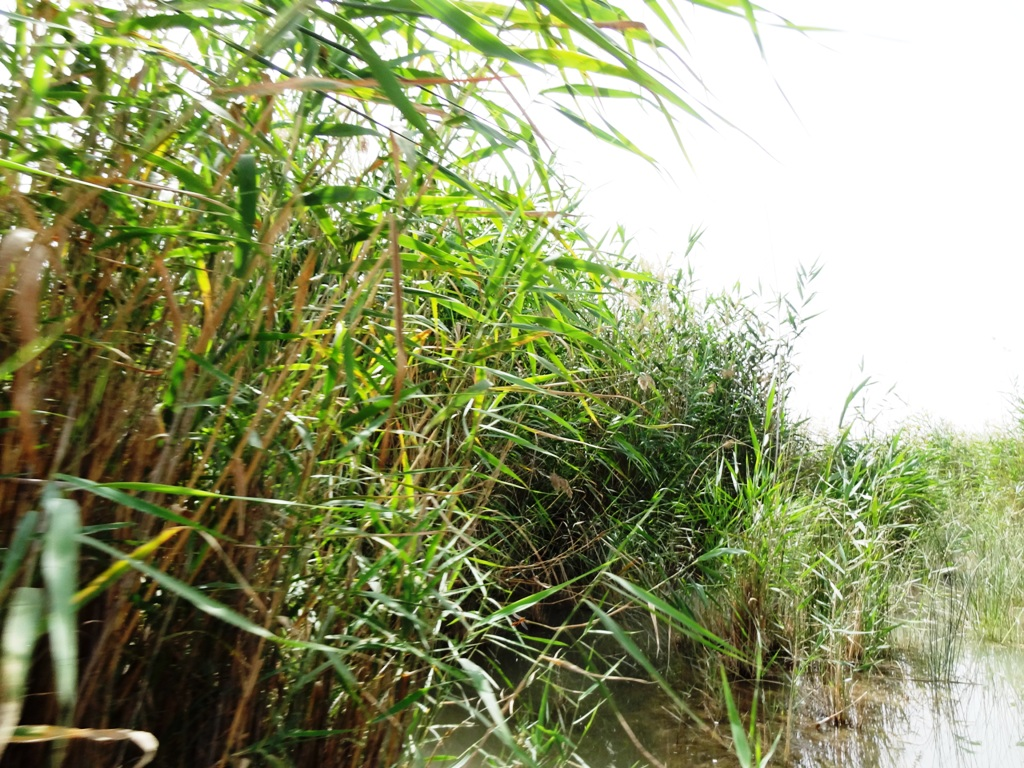
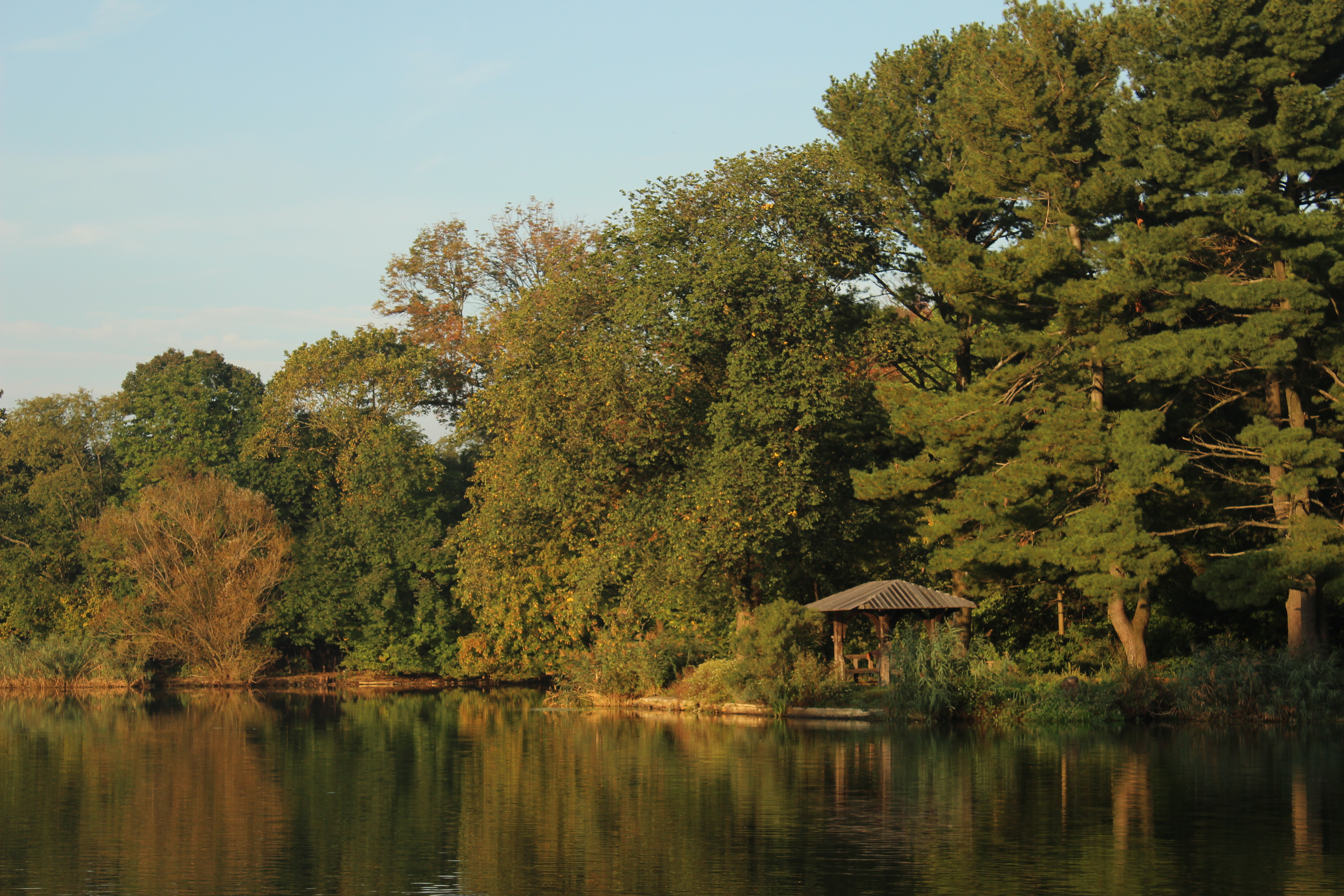
Who?	Into what?	By whom?	Notes	Image
Adonis's blood	Anemone	Aphrodite	Adonis was a most handsome youth that Aphrodite was enamored with. Although forced to split his time between her and Persephone, Adonis preferred Aphrodite. One day as he was hunting, a wild boar attacked and fatally wounded him, killing Adonis. The inconsolable Aphrodite turned her beloved's blood into a blood-red flower, anemone, which was closely associated with her thereafter. In some rarer traditions, Adonis' blood turned not into an anemone but rather a dark rose, another flower associated closely with Aphrodite.
Adonis's blood	Rose	Aphrodite
Agdistis's sex organ	Almond tree	None	Agdistis, an Anatolian deity born to Zeus, was born with both female and male genitalia. The other gods, fearing such a creature, cut off the male organ. The blood, as it fell on the ground, gave rise to an almond tree. According to an alternative version, Agdistis's blood gave rise to purple violet flowers instead.
Agdistis's sex organ	Violet	None	Agdistis, an Anatolian deity born to Zeus, was born with both female and male genitalia. The other gods, fearing such a creature, cut off the male organ. The blood, as it fell on the ground, gave rise to an almond tree. According to an alternative version, Agdistis's blood gave rise to purple violet flowers instead.
Ajax's blood	Larkspur	Unclear	When Ajax killed himself during the Trojan War his blood that dripped on the ground gave rise to a white-and-reddish hyacinth flower which bore on its leaves the initial letters of his name ai, which also was an expressive of lament. In antiquity, hyacinth probably described the various species of delphinium, and not the modern hyacinth flower.
Amaracus ("marjoram")	Marjoram	Aphrodite	Amaracus was a Cypriot youth who became the perfumer of the royal court of King Cinyras, his father, and he could create the most fragrant odors and aromas. The greatest odor he created when he accidentally fell, mixing all the ointments he was holding. He was eventually turned into a marjoram, a plant whose creation was credited to Aphrodite, and for which Cyprus was famous.
Ambrosia	Grapevine	Gaia or Dionysus	Ambrosia was a wet-nurse to Dionysus. When Lycurgus, king of Thrace, outlawed the worship of Dionysus, she was among those imprisoned. Lycurgus himself raised an axe against her; either she prayed to Gaia, who turned her into a grapevine to save her, or she was indeed slain by Lycurgus and afterwards turned into vine by Dionysus.
Ampelus ("grapevine")	Grapevine	Dionysus	Ampelus was a young lover of the wine god Dionysus who upon his death was transformed into a grapevine. Versions of his death vary; in one, he fell and died while picking grapes. In another, he mocked Selene, who then sent a gadfly to spook the bull he was riding, sending the bull into a frenzy and the unfortunate youth to his early death.
Anethus ("dill")	Dill	Unknown	In a nearly lost myth, the handsome boy Anethus was transformed into the flowering plant bearing his name, the dill. The details and conditions under this transformation happened are all lost, as the tale is preserved in a single, brief mention by a late-antiquity Latin author.
Aphrodite's tears	Rose	None	When Adonis was killed by a boar, Aphrodite's tears ran hot, and were transformed into one of her sacred flowers, the rose. Some versions swap the flowers and have the rose spring from Adonis's blood and the anemone from Aphrodite's tears.
Attis	Pine	Himself	Attis was the lover of the Phrygian goddess Cybele. When she caught him cheating on her with a Naiad nymph, Cybele killed the nymph and persuaded him to cut off his own genitalia, which Attis did. Sometime later he was transformed into a pine tree.
Baucis and Philemon	Oak tree and linden tree	Zeus	Once Hermes and Zeus looked for worthy men among a village, and only an elderly couple, Baucis and Philemon, welcomed them and gave them food. For this, upon their deaths, Zeus turned them into trees, an oak and a linden respectively, while he destroyed the rest of the impious village.
Calamus ("reed")	Water reed	None	According to Nonnus's Dionysiaca, Calamus was in love with Carpus, but Carpus drowned in the Meander river while the two were competing in a swimming contest. In his grief, Calamus drowned himself as well. He was then transformed into a water reed by the river bank, whose rustling in the wind was seen as a sigh of lamentation.
Carpus ("fruit")	Fruit	Unclear	Carpus and Calamus were two young lovers, but one day as they were swimming, Carpus drowned, prompting the inconsolable Calamus to drown himself as well. Carpus was changed into 'the fruit of the earth.'
Carya ("walnut")	Walnut tree	Dionysus	Dionysus had a secret affair with a mortal woman named Carya, a princess from Laconia. But her sisters tried to part the two lovers, breaking an earlier promise they had made to Apollo that they would never betray the gods. The sisters went mad, while Dionysus turned Carya into a walnut tree.
Cerberus's saliva	Wolfsbane	None	According to Ovid, when Heracles went into the Underworld to retrieve the three-headed dog Cerberus, the hound struggled greatly to break free from the hero's grip. During the struggle, some of his saliva fell on the ground, poisoning the soil and giving birth to aconite, a poisonous herb used by witches such as Medea.
Cissus	Ivy	None	Cissus was a young satyr companion of Dionysus who, as Dionysus himself predicted, ended up transforming into an ivy vine.
Clytie	Heliotropium	None	Clytie was an Oceanid and a lover of Helios the Sun, who, because of Aphrodite, left her for another. Clytie, heartbroken over his rejection, betrayed the affair to the girl's father who then had her killed. This failed to win Helios back at her, so Clytie pined naked for nine days and night on a rock, watching Helios travel in the sky above, until she was transformed into a flower, the heliotrope, ever watching the sun.
Crocus	Crocus flower	Hermes	Crocus was a male lover of Hermes. One day, when the two were playing a game of discus, Crocus unexpectedly stood up as Hermes was throwing his discus, and ended up getting hit and dying. Hermes then turned his dead lover into the saffron-producing crocus.
Cyparissus ("cypress")	Cypress	Apollo or Silvanus	Cyparissus was one of Apollo's many male lovers. One day that the two youths were hunting together, Cyparissus accidentally shot and killed his favourite deer, plunging him into deep grief. He begged Apollo to let him grieve for the deer forever, and Apollo granted his wish by turning him into a cypress tree, which to this day remains a symbol of sadness and mourning. Roman tradition replaced Apollo with a local Roman woodland god, Silvanus, keeping the other details the same.
Daphne ("laurel")	Laurel	Peneus/Ladon or Gaia or Zeus	She was a Naiad nymph who took a vow of maidenhood. When the god Apollo saw her and fell in love with her, he pursued her with the aim of making her his bride, but she ran away from him, wishing to stay a virgin eternally. After much pursuing, Daphne began to tire; when Apollo was about to catch her, she prayed to the gods to save her, and she was turned (either by her father, Gaia or Zeus) into a laurel tree, which thereupon became the sacred tree of Apollo.
Diopatra's sisters	Black poplar trees	Poseidon	According to one of the tales the mortal man Cerambus spread, Poseidon once temporarily transformed Diopatra's sisters into black poplar trees, so that he could take his pleasure with Diopatra undisturbed. Once he was finished with Diopatra, he changed them all back into maidens.
Dryope	Black poplar trees	Nymphs, or Lotis' tree	Dryope tried to pick some red flowers from Lotis' lotus tree for her young son, but then blood from the tree dripped on her and she transformed into a black poplar. In another version, she was a priestess but some nymphs took her away and left a poplar in her place, or made her into a nymph.
Elaea	Olive tree	Gaia	Elaea was an Attic girl of great beauty and talent in both the ring and the footrace. For this she attracted the envy of the defeated athletes, who ended up murdering her out of jealousy, but Gaia, for Athena's sake, transformed the dead Elaea into an olive tree.
Elate ("fir")	Fir	Unclear	When the Aloadae were killed after trying to wage war against the heavens, their sister Elate mourned them so much she was changed into a fir tree, and kept her beauty and great size in her new life, hence the great size of firs.
Eteocles's daughters	Cypress trees	Gaia	The three daughters of Eteocles, while dancing and singing in honour of the three Graces, fell into a deep well and drowned. Gaia in pity transformed all three into proud and tall cypresses. This is also supposedly why cypresses were also called graces colloquially in antiquity.
Heliades	Black poplar tree	None, or Helios	The daughters of Helios, were the sisters of Phaethon who bitterly mourned his fiery death by the banks of the river Eridanus where their brother fell, until eventually they were all turned into black poplar trees. According to Quintus Smyrnaeus, it was Helios himself who turned them into trees. Their names vary, but usually include Aegle, Aetheria, Dioxippe, Helie, Lampetia, Merope, Phaethusa and Phoebe.
Hera's milk	Lily	None	When Zeus desired to grant great strength to the infant Heracles, he placed him on sleeping Hera's breast so he could suckle divine milk from her. When the infant was removed, some milk spilt everywhere- the portion that went to the sky created the Milky Way, while the portion that fell on the earth transformed into a white lily.
Hesperides	Poplar tree, elm tree, willow tree	Themselves	The Hesperid nymphs lived in the far west along with Atlas who held the sky in his back, where they guarded the Apples of the Hesperides, that Heracles once took. When the Argonauts arrived on the island of the Hesperides, Orpheus pleaded with for they were in need of water, and the Hesperides transformed into trees. Hespere became a poplar, Eretheis an elm, and Aegle a willow. All three retained their consciousness and their speech in their new forms, and showed the Argonauts where they could find a spring.
Hyacinthus ("hyacinth")	Larkspur	Apollo	Hyacinthus was a young Spartan prince and a lover of the god. One day, as they were playing a game of discus, Apollo accidentally struck Hyacinthus in the head, killing him. Apollo, distraught, turned the dying prince into a flower bearing his name. That flower was most likely not what is known today as hyacinth, but a member of the delphinium species (larkspur), based on its description.
Io (partially)	Violet	Gaia	When Zeus turned his mistress Io into a cow to hide her from Hera, Gaia pitied the girl and created the violet so Io could feed from it, and thus the flower "sprung from her from whom it has its name", going with folk etymology for Io's name and the Greek word for violet, ion. Despite that, the two words are not actually related.
Leuce ("white" or "poplar")	White poplar tree	Hades	Leuce was an Oceanid nymph who became mistress to Hades. When she died, Hades honoured his beloved companion by turning her into a white poplar tree, and placed her in the entrance of the Underworld, as a token of love and remembrance.
Leucothoe	Frankincense tree	Helios	Leucothoe was buried alive by her father Orchamus after the jealous Clytie, still in love with Helios, revealed to him that his daughter was no longer a maiden. Helios arrived too late to save her, so instead he turned her into a frankincense tree, so she would still breathe air after a fashion, and not stay buried deep beneath in the soil.
Libanus	Rosemary	Gaia	The Syrian Libanus was a young boy who had been brought up in a temple. One day, some impious men attacked and murdered him. Gaia transformed his dead body into a plant, which was as dear to the gods as the living boy had once been. Both the frankincense and the rosemary are connected to his name in Greek, however it is clear that the myth refers to the rosemary.
Lotis ("lotus")	Lotus flower	The gods	Lotis was a beautiful nymph who tried to escape the amorous advances of the god Priapus; he chased her, so she was turned into the lotus, either a tree or a plant, by the gods in order to save her from his grasp. The plant, whether tree or flower that Lotis turned into, poses several difficulties in its identification, and thus it is unclear what sort of plant with purple flowers that grows near water Ovid had in mind; the lotus flower and water lily have been both suggested and rejected in turn, as they grow in water, instead of near water as the ancient text described. The tree does not match either the description of the plant that Lotis was turned into; botanical candidates for the exact genus of the tree include the diospyros lotus and the ziziphus lotus.
Lotis ("lotus")	Lotus tree	The gods
Lycurgus's tear	Cabbage	Unclear	It is said that when Dionysus ran away from Lycurgus he dove into the sea, and Lycurgus, bound by his vines, shed a tear, which transformed into cabbage, and for this reasons grape and cabbage had a mutual dislike and could not thrive if near each other.
Mecon ("poppy")	Poppy	Unclear (Demeter?)	Mecon was a handsome Athenian man who became lover to the goddess Demeter, and was transformed at some point into a poppy flower for preservation.
Melos ("apple")	Apple	Aphrodite	Melos was a Delian man who became close friends with Adonis after he arrived in Cyprus. When Adonis was killed by a boar, Melos was so distraught that he hanged himself from an apple tree, which then took its name. After mourning her beloved Adonis, Aphrodite turned Melos's lifeless body into an apple fruit.
Messapian shepherd	Wild olive tree	Nymphs	A rude shepherd frightened Pan's nymph companions, and proceeded to make fun of them and their dancing, mimicking their moves with insults and mockery. The nymphs turned him into a wild olive, whose bitter berries still bear the sourness of his tongue.
Messapian shepherds	Trees	Nymphs	Some shepherds claimed they could dance better than the Epimelides nymphs. They got into a dancing contest, not realizing they were competing against goddesses, and lost as their dancing was without art, whereas the nymphs danced with grace. The nymphs then turned them all into (unspecified) trees as punishment.
Minthe ("mint")	Mint	Persephone or Demeter or Hades	Minthe was a Naiad nymph of the Underworld who became a mistress of Hades, the god of the dead, that was turned into mint, either by his wife Persephone (out of anger), Persephone's mother Demeter (avenging her daughter) or alternatively Persephone tore her into pieces, and it was Hades who turned his dead lover into mint.
Myrice ("tamarisk")	Tamarisk	Unclear (Aphrodite?)	Myrice was one of Cinyras' daughters, thus sister to Adonis. She was transformed into a tamarisk tree, perhaps by Aphrodite.
Myrina ("myrtle")	Myrtle	Aphrodite	Myrina was a devoted priestess of Aphrodite, however against her wishes her previous betrothed carried her off to marry her, so Myrina killed him. In gratitude over her loyal servitude, Aphrodite changed her into a myrtle.
Myrsine ("myrtle")	Myrtle	Athena	Myrsine was an Attic girl of great beauty and talent in both the ring and the footrace. For this she attracted the envy of the defeated athletes, who ended up murdering her out of jealouysy, but Athena transformed the dead Myrsine into a myrtle.
Narcissus ("daffodil")	Narcissus	None	Narcissus was an extremely lovely but also vain youth who rejected all potential lovers. After his attention was directed to a pool of water, he fell in love with the image of his reflection. Unable to even touch the object of his passion, Narcissus pined and wasted away by the bank until only the narcissus flower was all that was left of him.
Oechalian maidens	Firs	Nymphs	When the Oechalian princess Dryope had departed to join the nymphs in the woods, two maidens of the village spread the rumour that she had been abducted by said nymphs. The nymphs were angered by this and transformed the girls into pine trees.
Philyra ("linden")	Linden tree	Zeus	Philyra was an Oceanid nymph who lay secretly with Cronus. As Cronus' wife Rhea walked in on them, Cronus transformed into a horse to evade notice. Because of that, their child Chiron was born half-horse. Philyra, ashamed of the strange creature she had brought fourth, abandoned the infant and begged Zeus to transform her into the linden tree, which he did.
Phyllis	Almond tree	None	Phyllis was a mortal woman whose husband Demophon, bound by duty, had to go to assist his father, leaving Phyllis alone. Phyllis gave him a casket which he was not supposed to open unless he would not be able to return to her. Fearing that Demophon would never return, Phyllis killed herself via hanging, and from her grave an almond tree grew.
Picolous's blood	Moly	None	Picolous was one of the Giants who attacked the Gods; he fled the Gigantomachy after their defeat and tried to attack Circe on her island, Aeaea, and was then killed by Circe's father Helios. His black blood seeped into the ground as he died and became the black-rooted plant moly, which has been suggested to be a member of the Galanthus genus.
Pitys ("pine")	Pine	Gaia	Pan loved Pitys, a young nymph, who rejected his love. Pan chased her, but she fled from him, and she disappeared into the arms of Gaia, the earth, turning into a pine tree. In another version, Pitys chose Pan between him and Boreas, and Boreas, in anger, chased her and threw her off a cliff, killing her, thereupon Gaia turned her into a pine tree.
Platanus ("plane tree")	Plane	Unclear	When the Aloadae were killed after trying to wage war against the heavens, their sister Platanus mourned them so much she was changed into a plane tree, and kept her beauty and great size in her new life, hence the great size of planes.
Psalacantha	Psalacanthus	Dionysus	The nymph Psalacantha promised to help Dionysus court the Cretan princess Ariadne as long as he slept with her. Dionysus refused, so Psalacantha retaliated by advising Ariadne against going with him; the god, enraged, turned Psalacantha into an obscure plant bearing her name, psalakanthos, that supposedly bears resemblance to the melilot (pictured).
Side ("pomegranate")	Pomegranate tree	The gods	Side was a young maiden who was chased down by her own father Ictinus who wanted to force himself on her. Exhausted, Side reached her dead mother's grave and killed herself on it. The gods then transformed Side's blood into a pomegranate tree, and her father into a kite bird, which never rests on pomegranate trees.
Smilax ("bindweed")	Bindweed	The gods	Smilax was a young nymph who was turned by the gods into bindweed, in a little-attested tradition which usually connects her with Crocus.
Smyrna ("myrrh")	Myrrh	None	Smyrna according to myth was a young woman who fell in love with her father Cinyras/Theias, usually as a result of a curse inflicted on her by Aphrodite. Smyrna consorted with her drunken father secretly for several nights until she fell pregnant. Her father, wanting to find out the identity of his mysterious lover, lit her face with a torch, and when he discovered it was his daughter, he chased her down with the means to kill her. Smyrna prayed, and was transformed into a myrrh tree. Several months later, a baby boy emerged from the tree trunk.
Spear of Amphiaraus	Laurel	Unclear	During the war against Thebes, while the allies of Polyneices were feasting, an eagle swooped down and carried the spear of one of them, Amphiaraus to a great height before letting it drop. The spear fell, and was fixed in the earth and was changed into a laurel tree.
Syceus ("fig")	Fig tree	Gaia	According to myth, Syceus was one of the Titans. Zeus, the king of gods who overthrew the Titans during the Titanomachy and threw them all into Tartarus, pursued him, and Syceus took refuge into his mother Gaia's bosom, who grew a fig tree in his place.
Syrinx ("pipe")	Reeds	Naiads	Much like Daphne, Syrinx was a nymph and follower of the goddess Artemis who swore to never marry or have any children. Syrinx caught the attention of the goat-god Pan, who, enamored with her, chased her as she fled. Syrinx, as she reached the river Ladon, begged the river nymphs to help her out. They answered by changing her form into hollow water reeds.
Thracian women	Trees	Dionysus	Dionysus turned some Thracian women into unspecified trees as punishment for them murdering Orpheus.

=== Metamorphoses into animals (non-avian) ===
Metamorphoses into animals (non-avian)
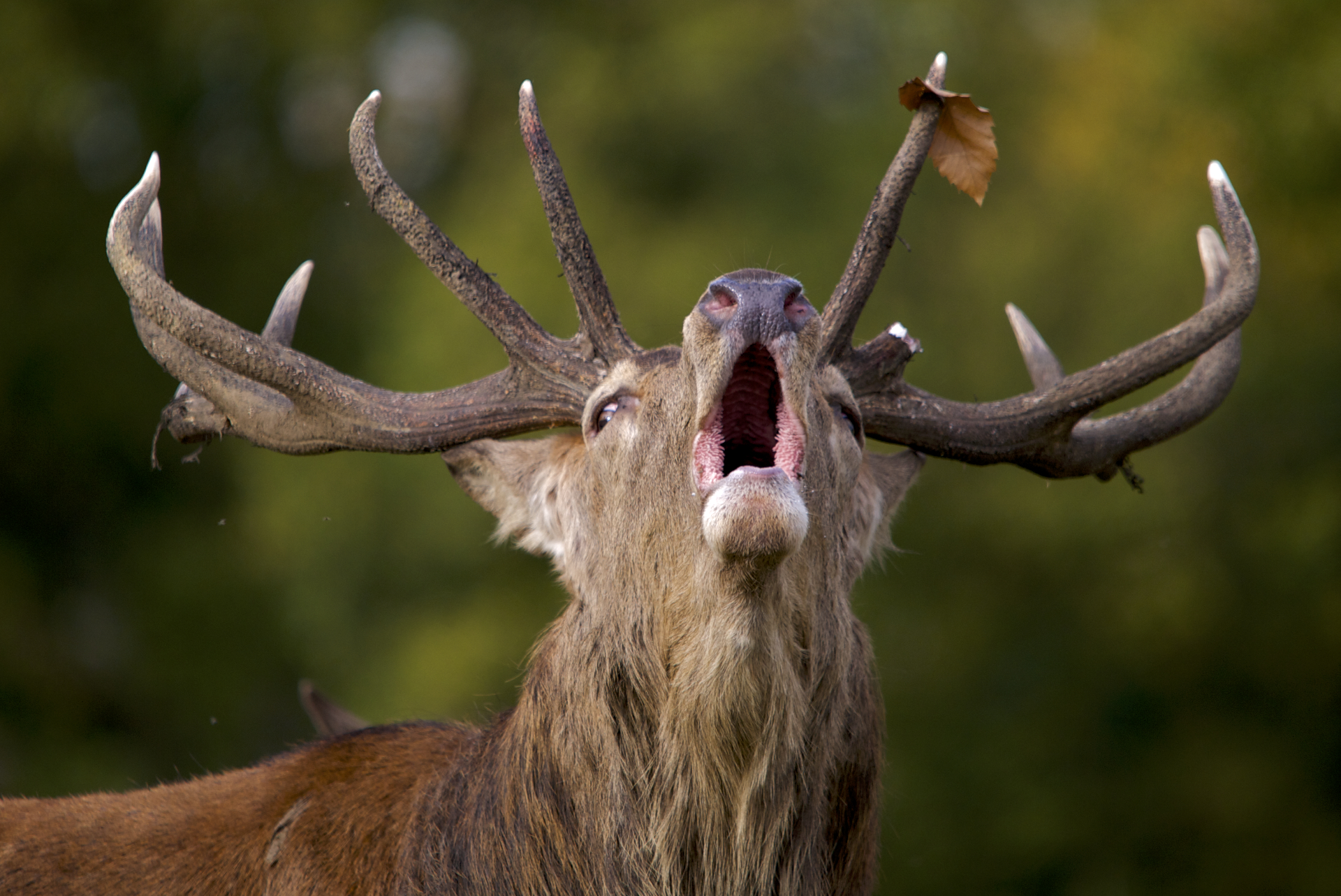
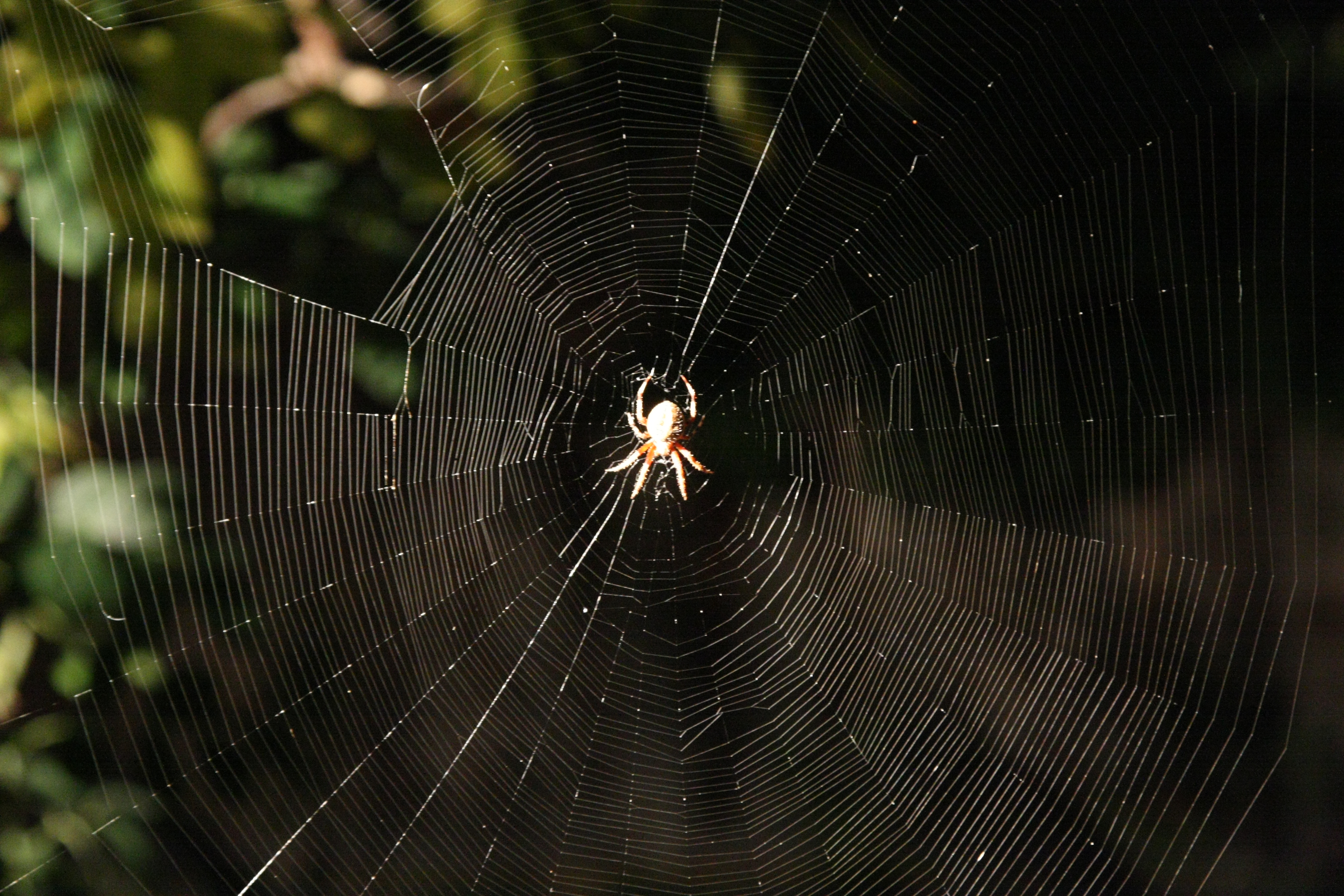
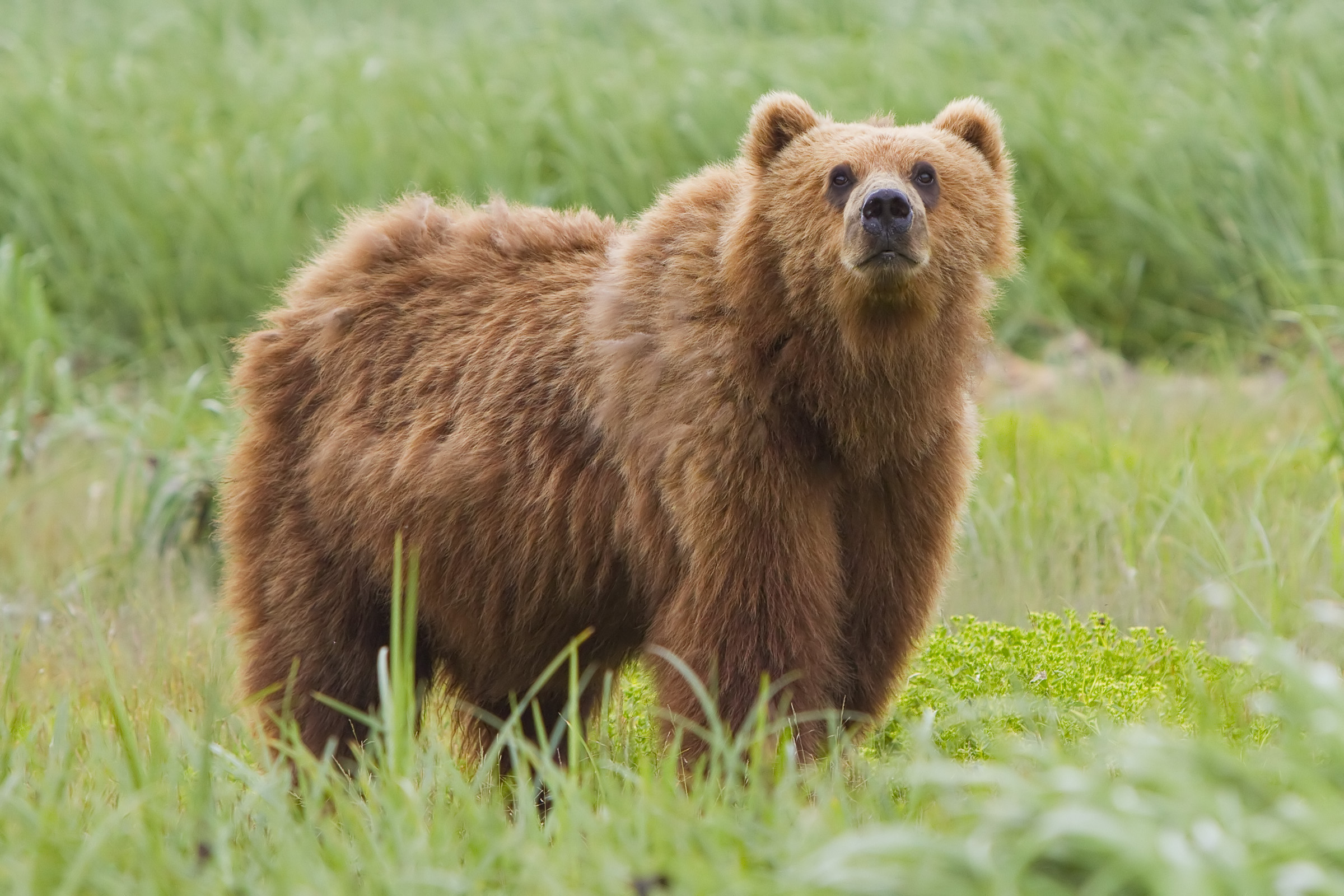
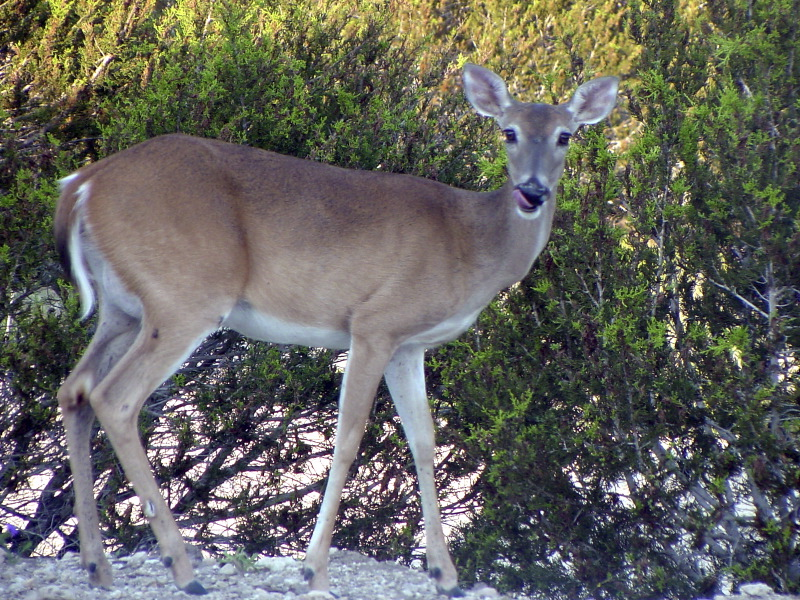
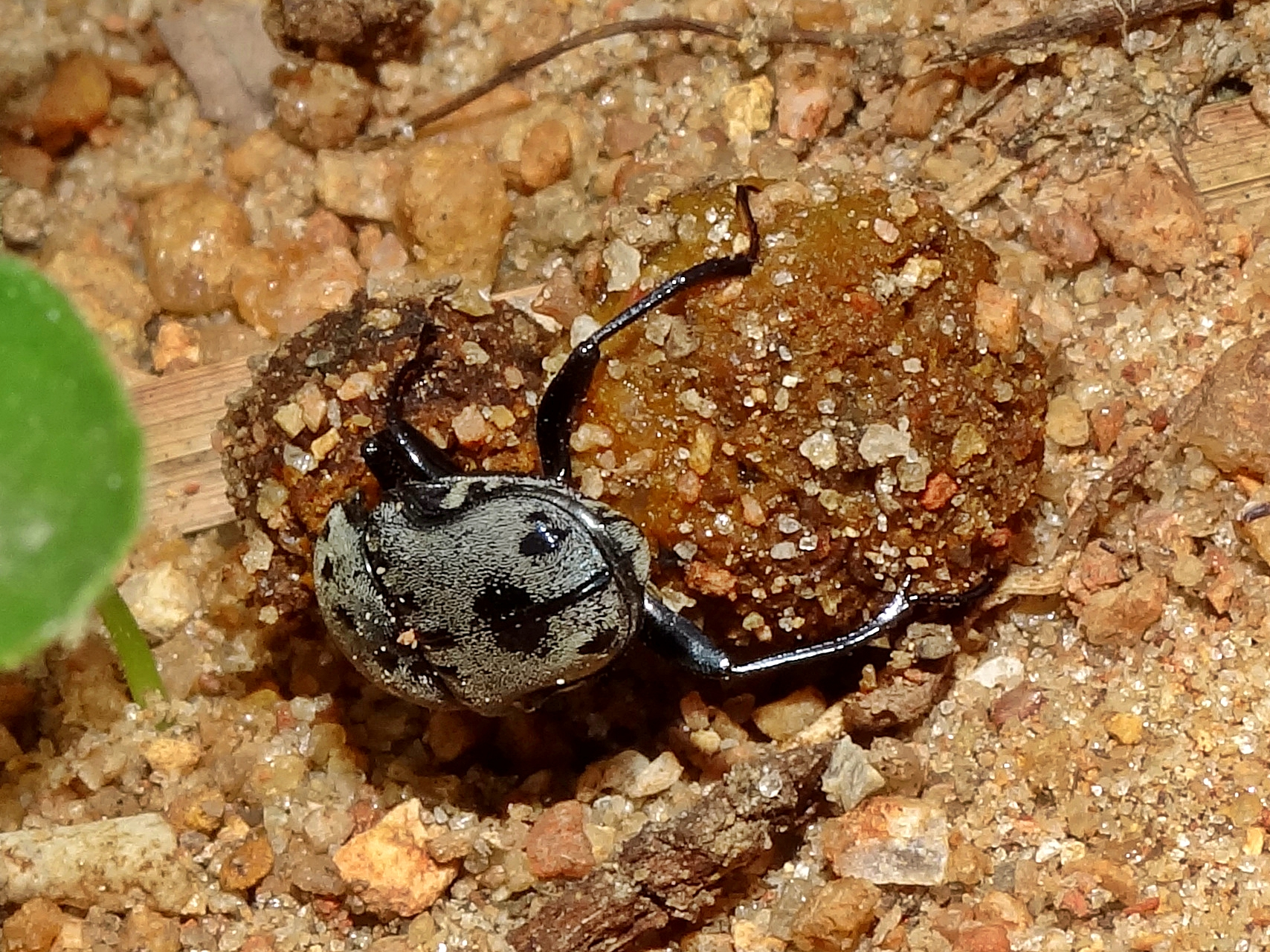
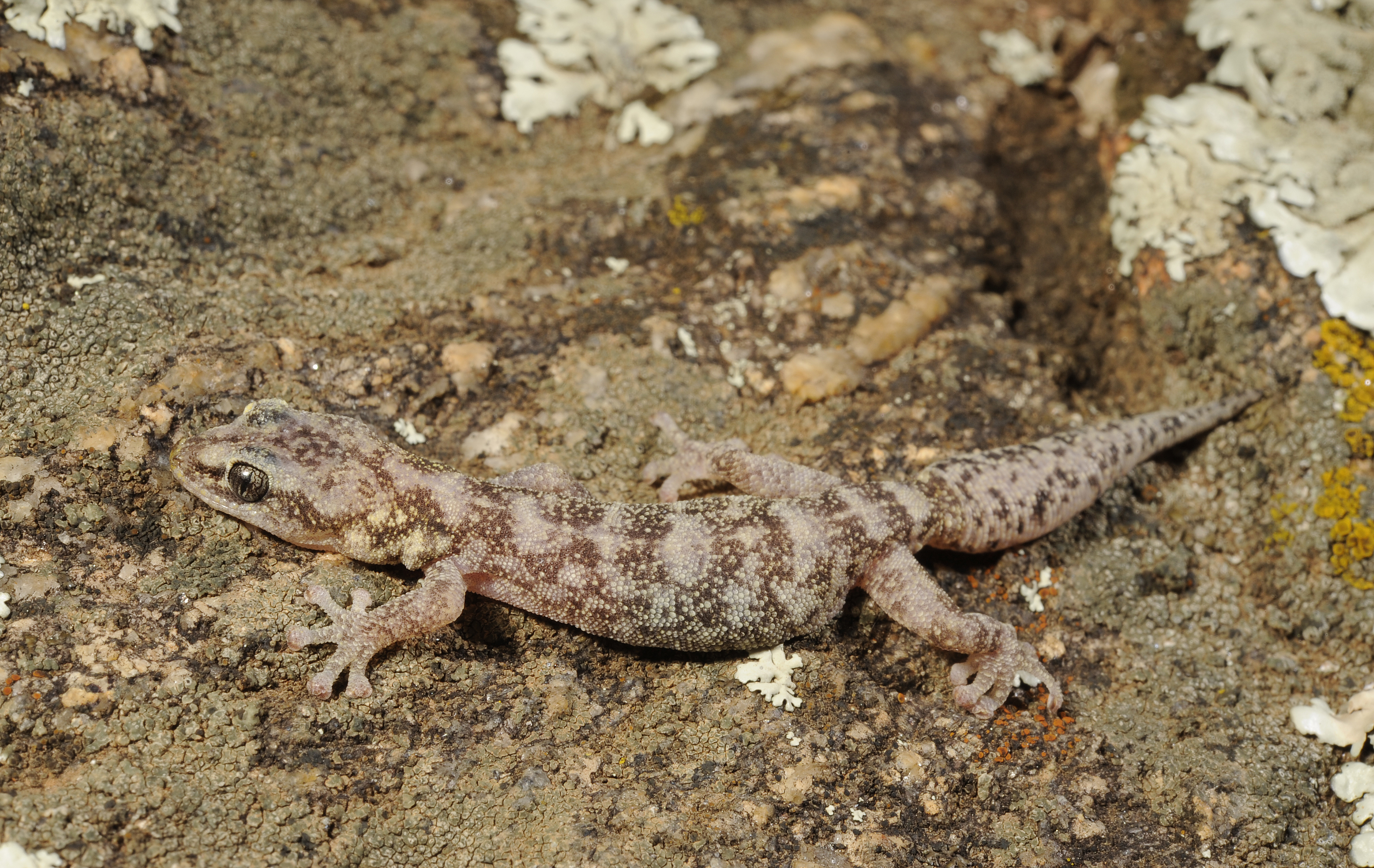
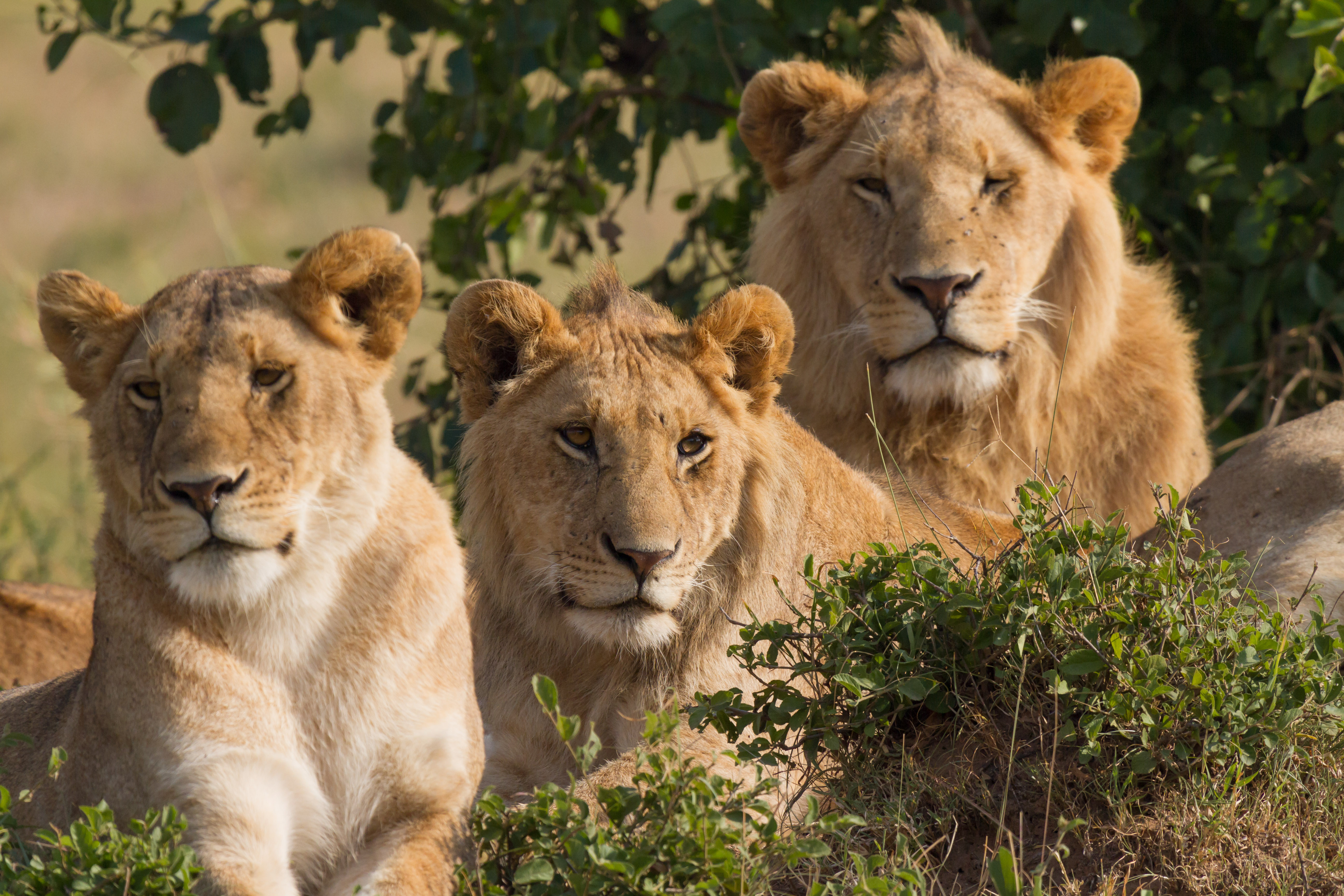
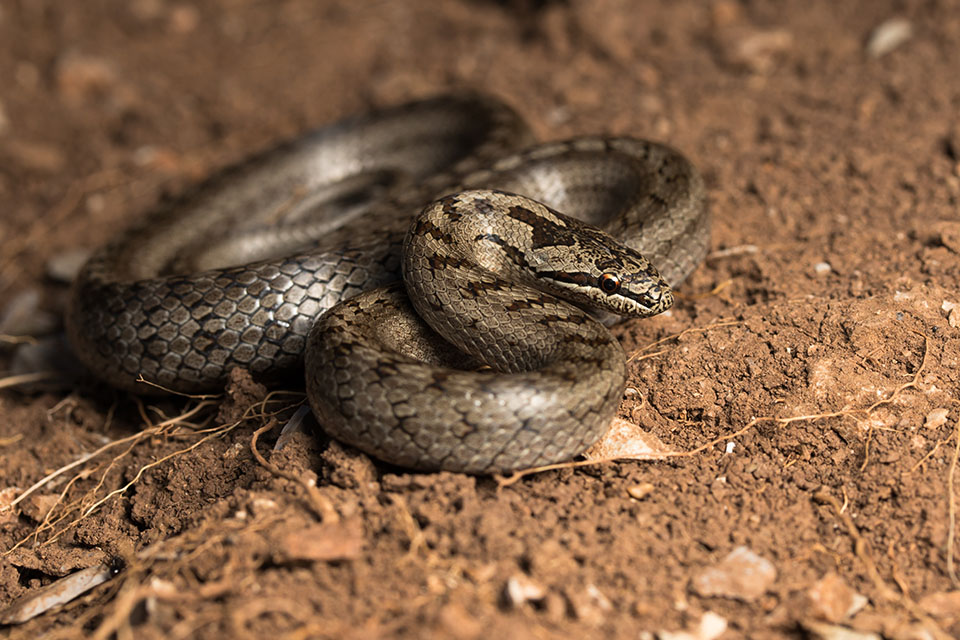
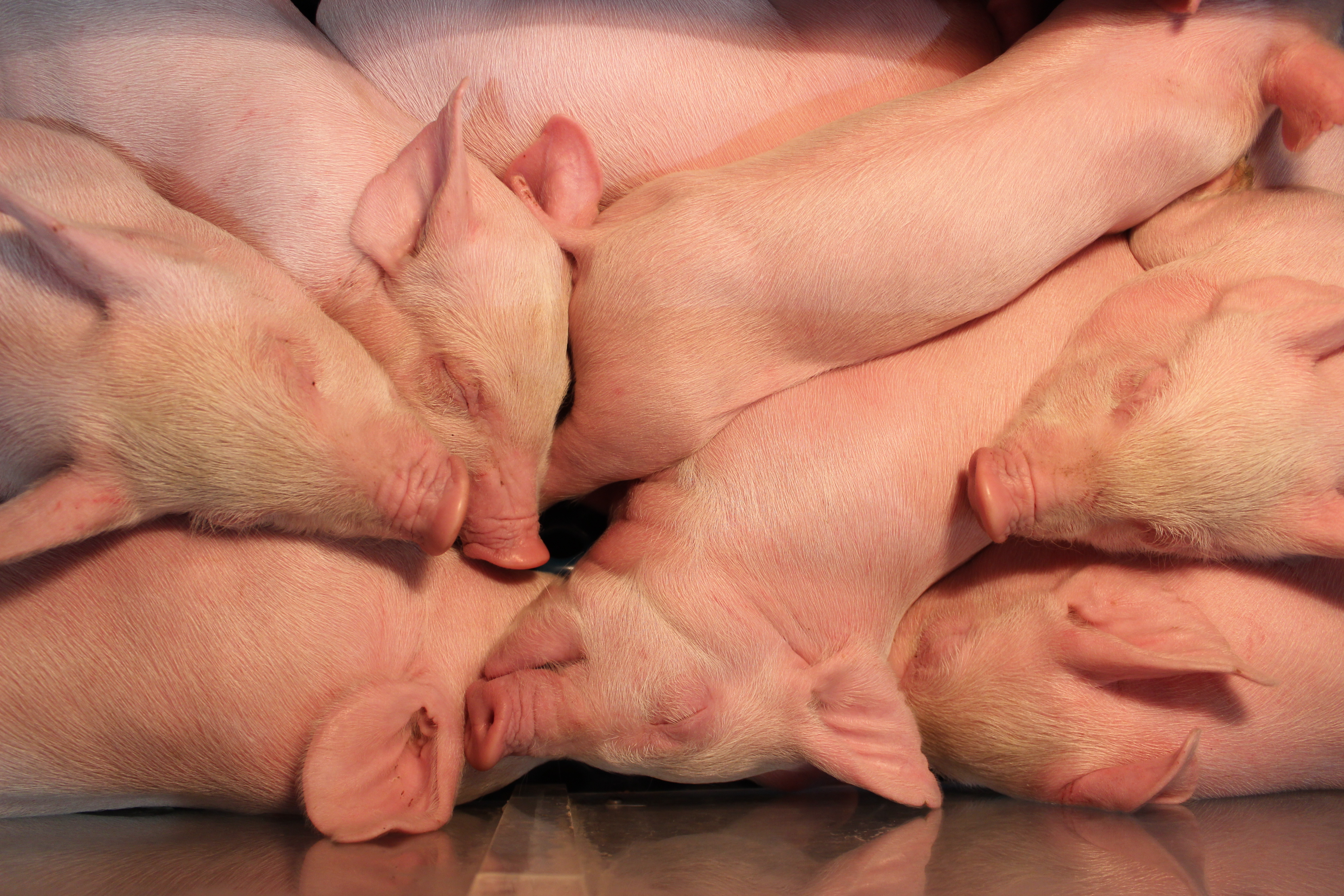
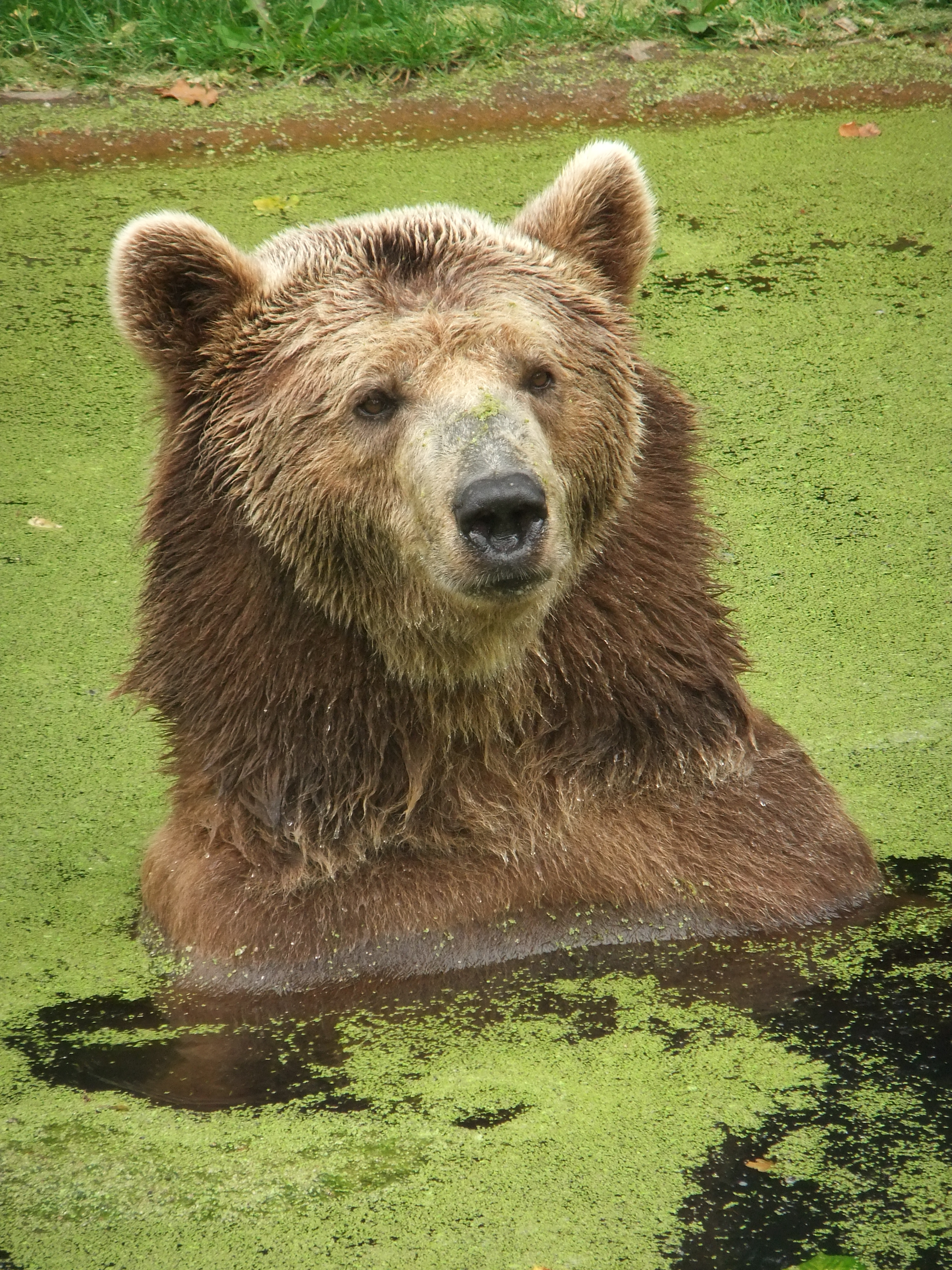
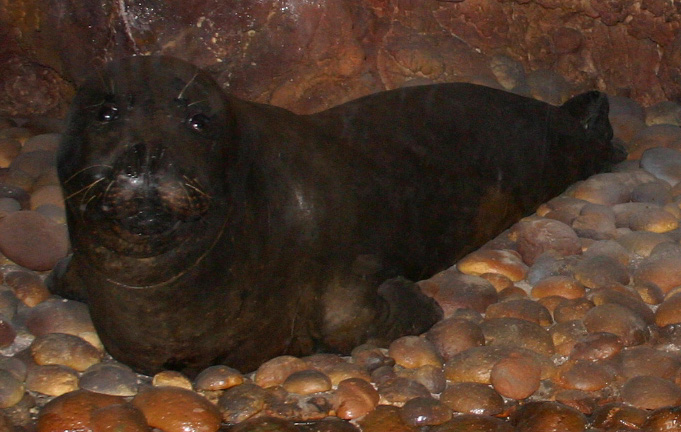
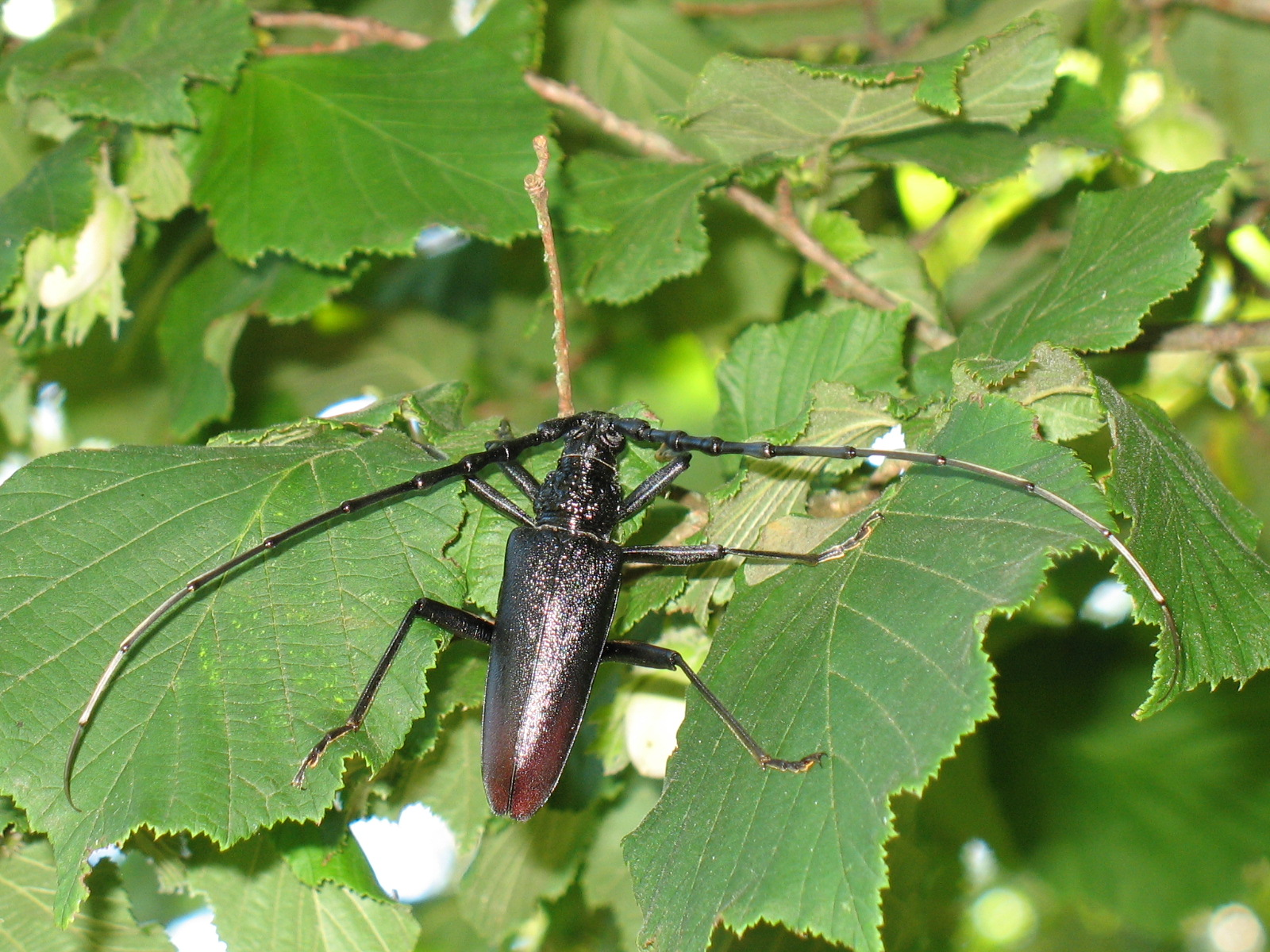
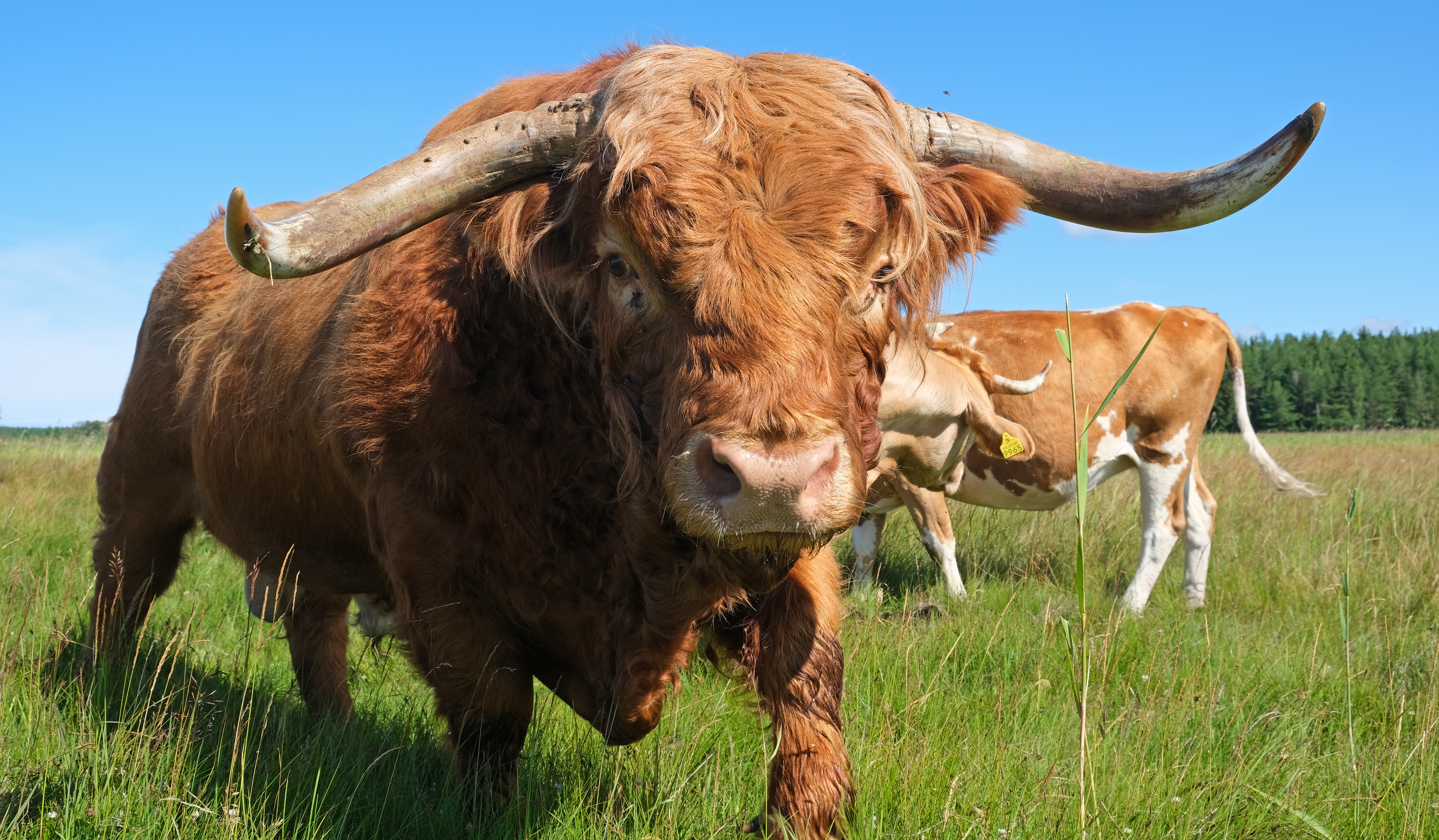
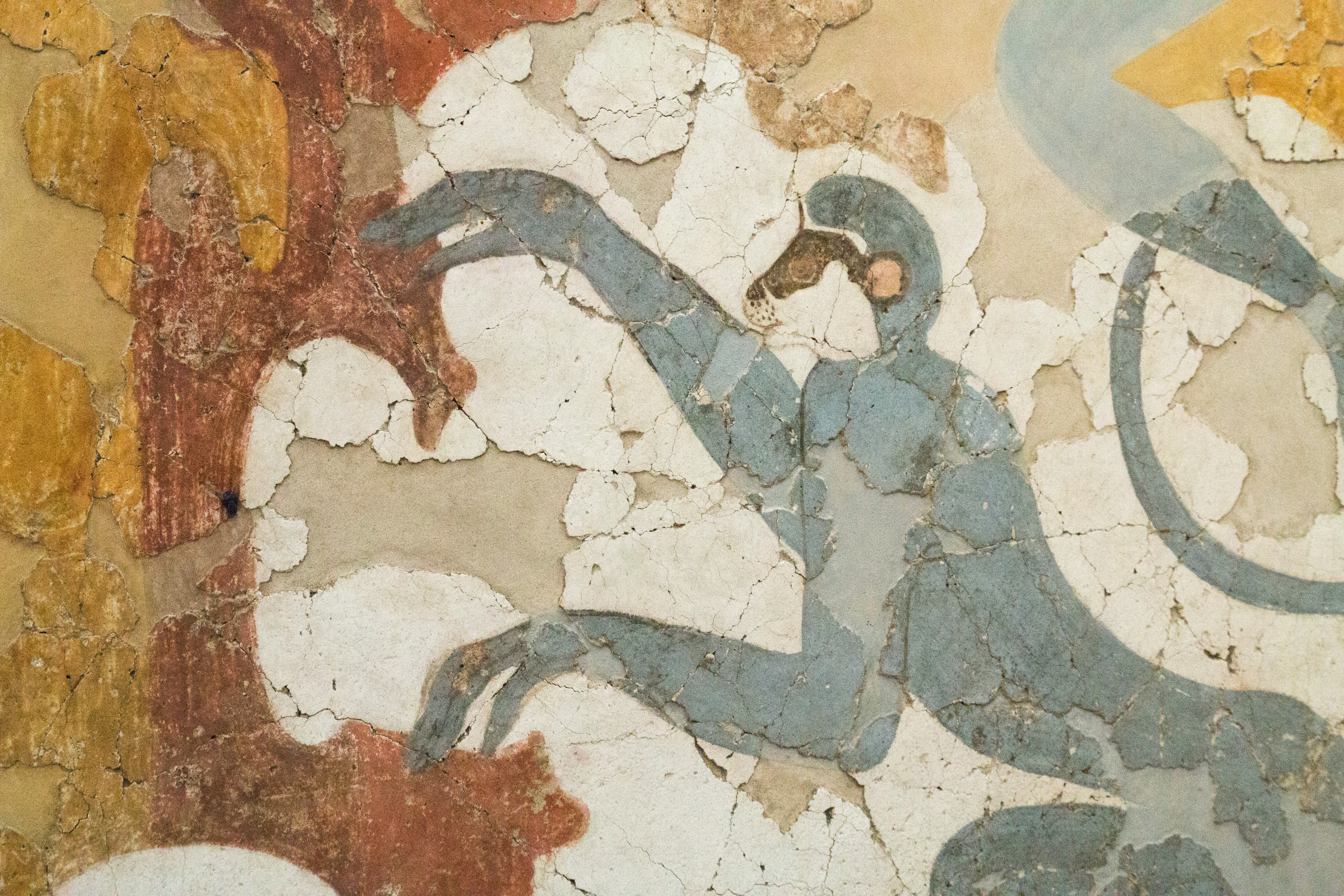
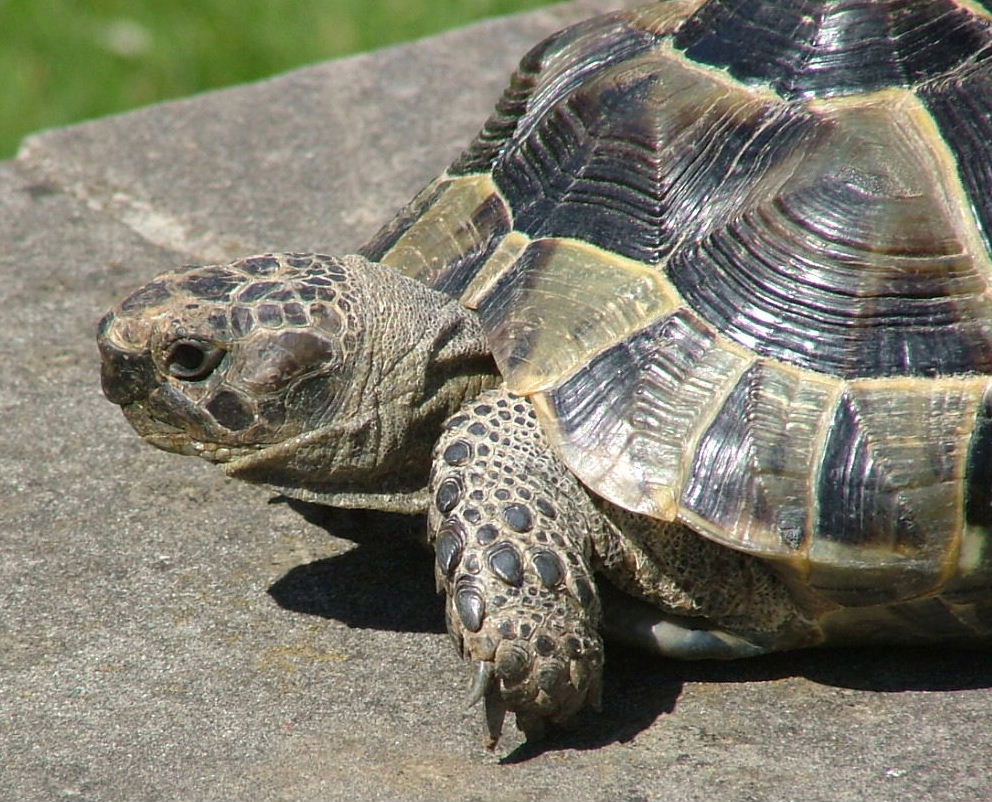
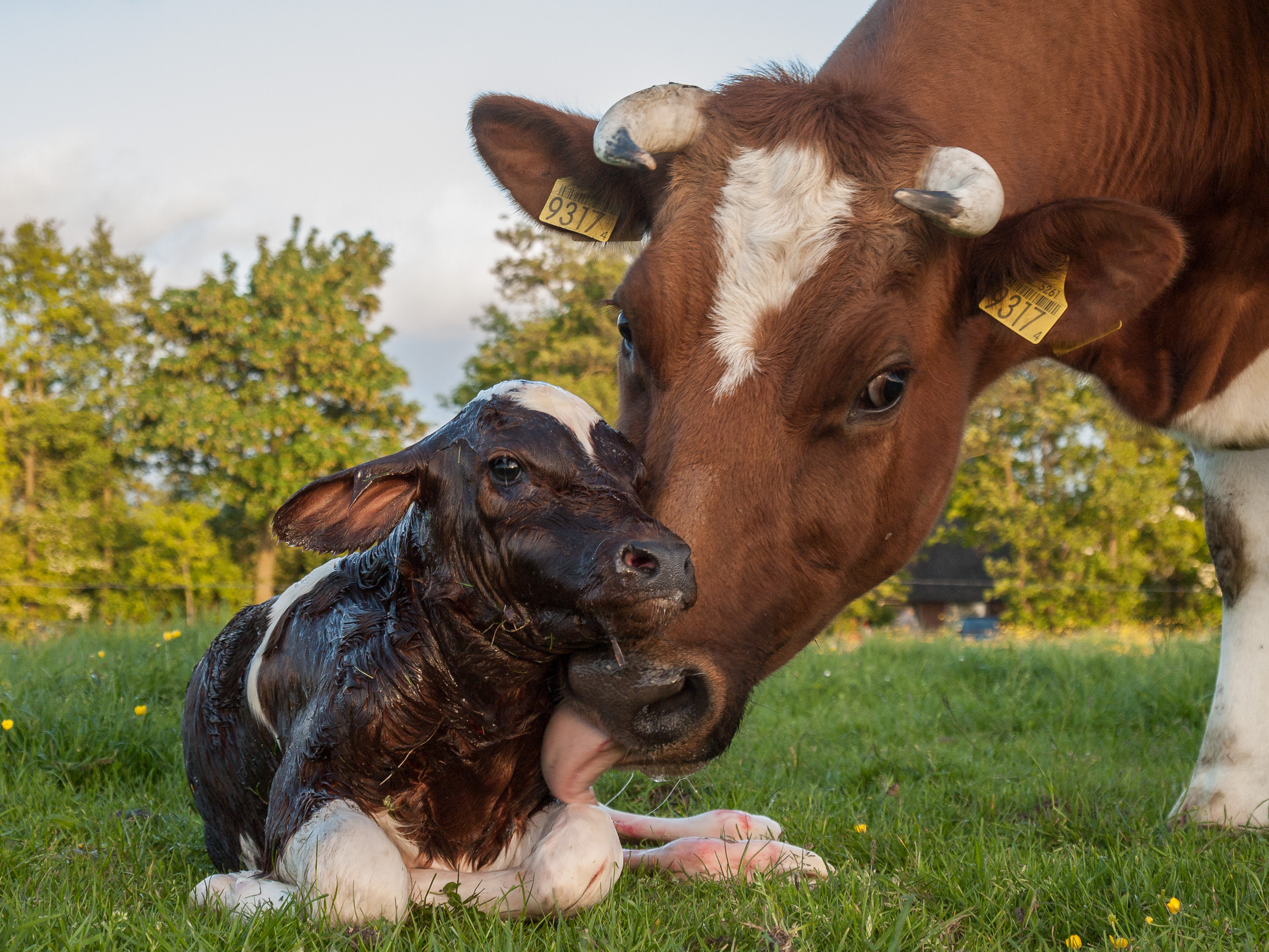
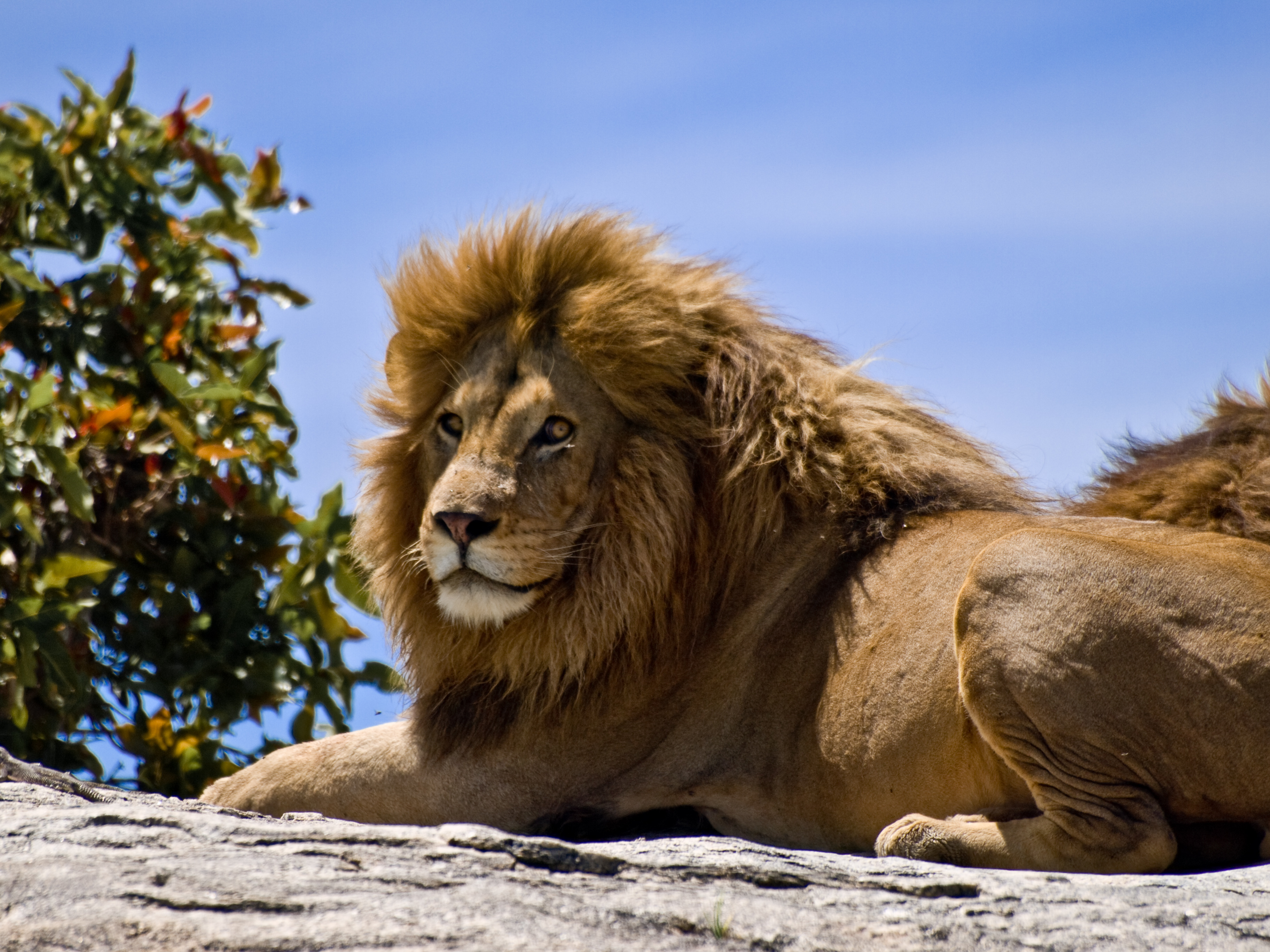
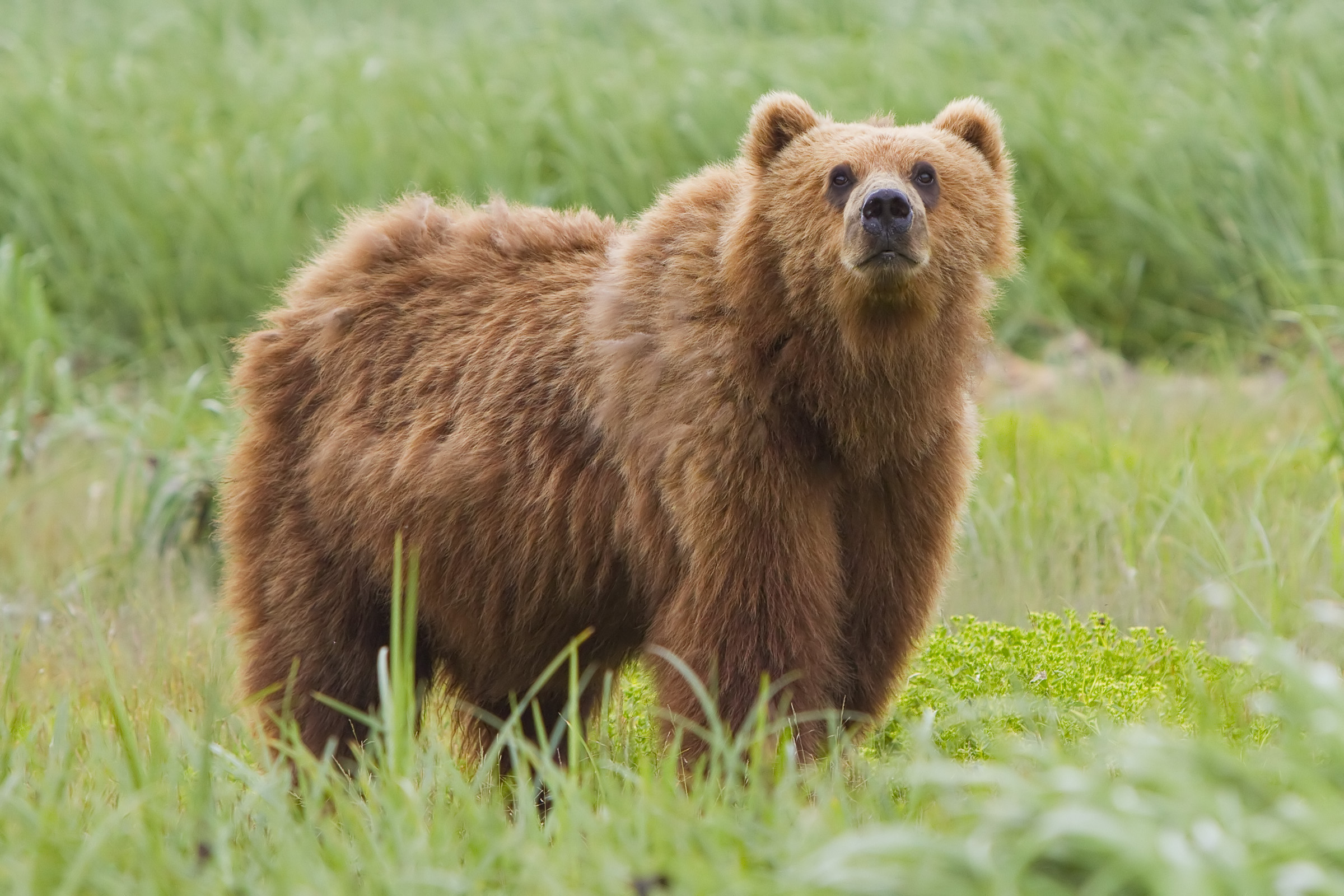
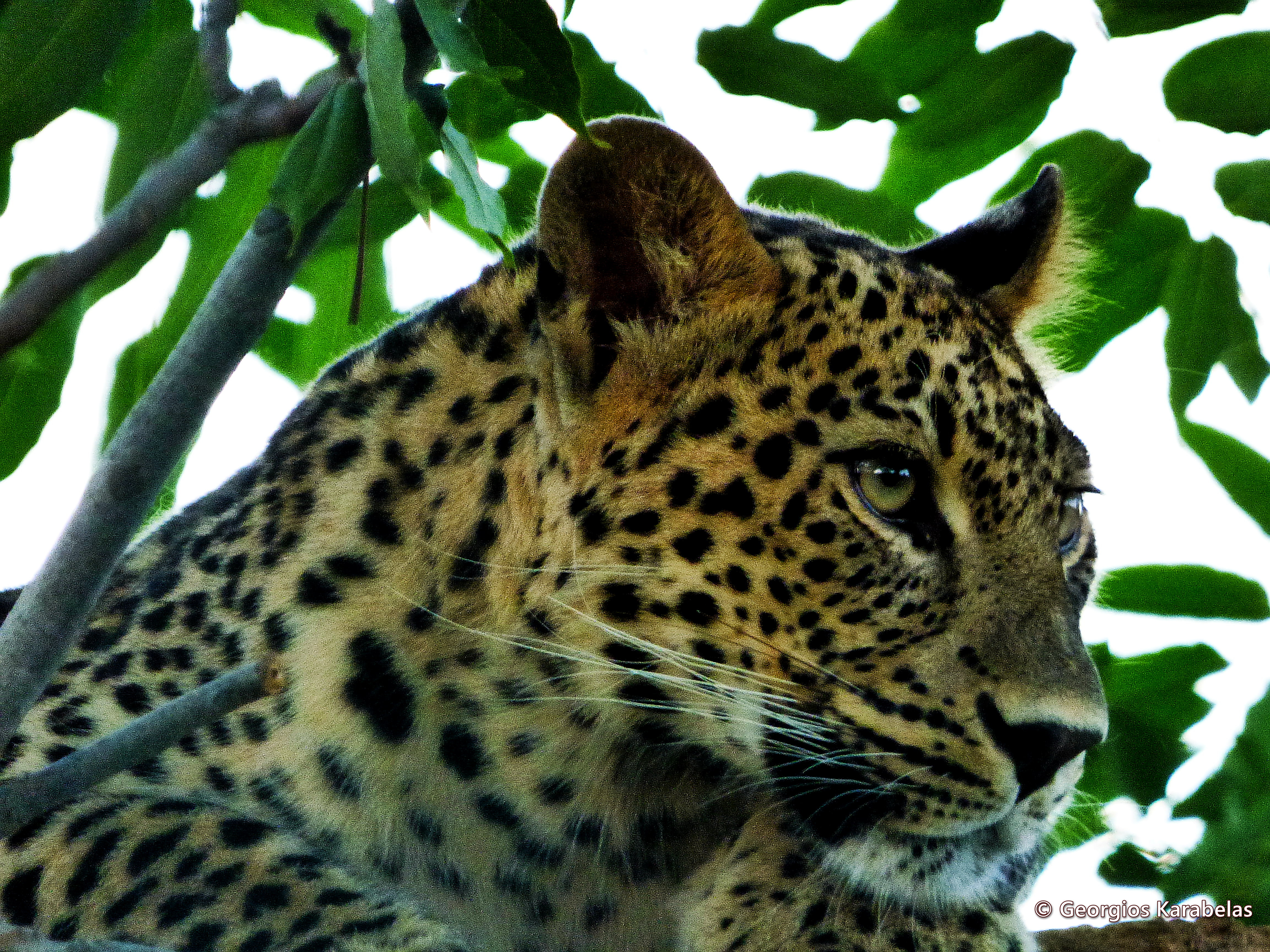
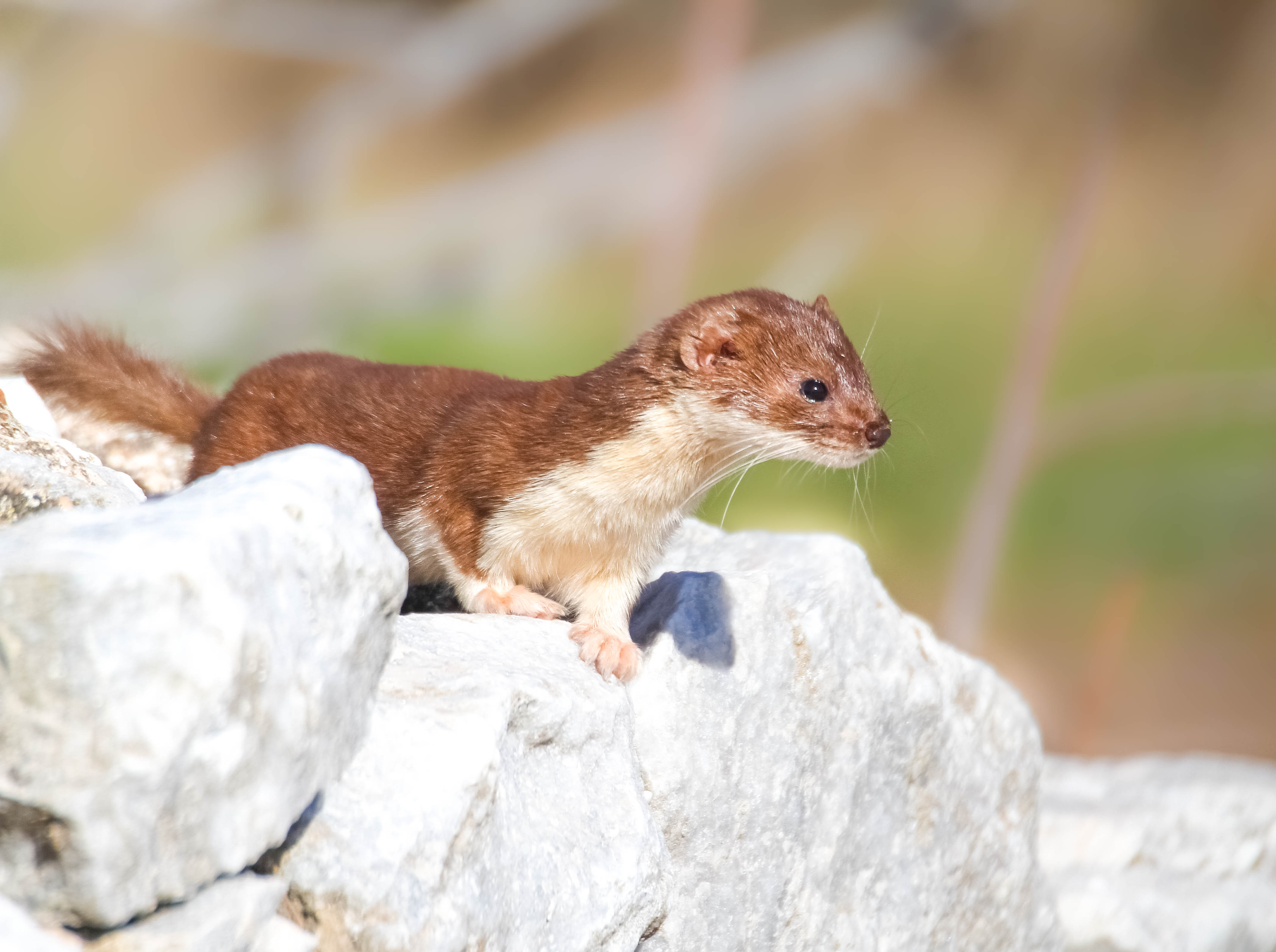
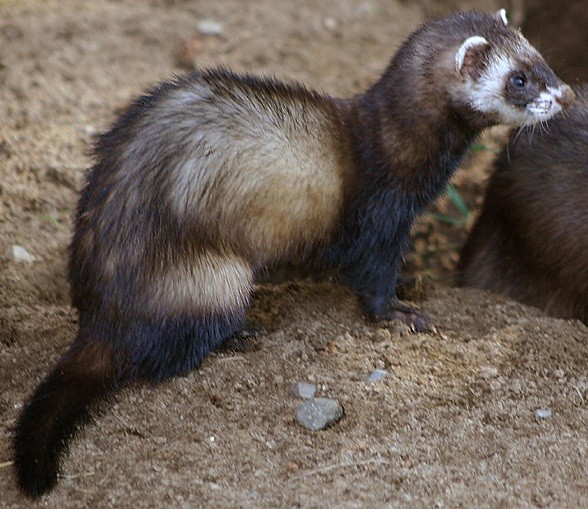
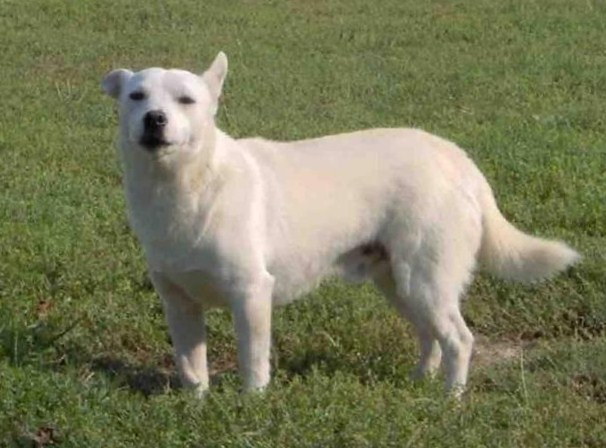
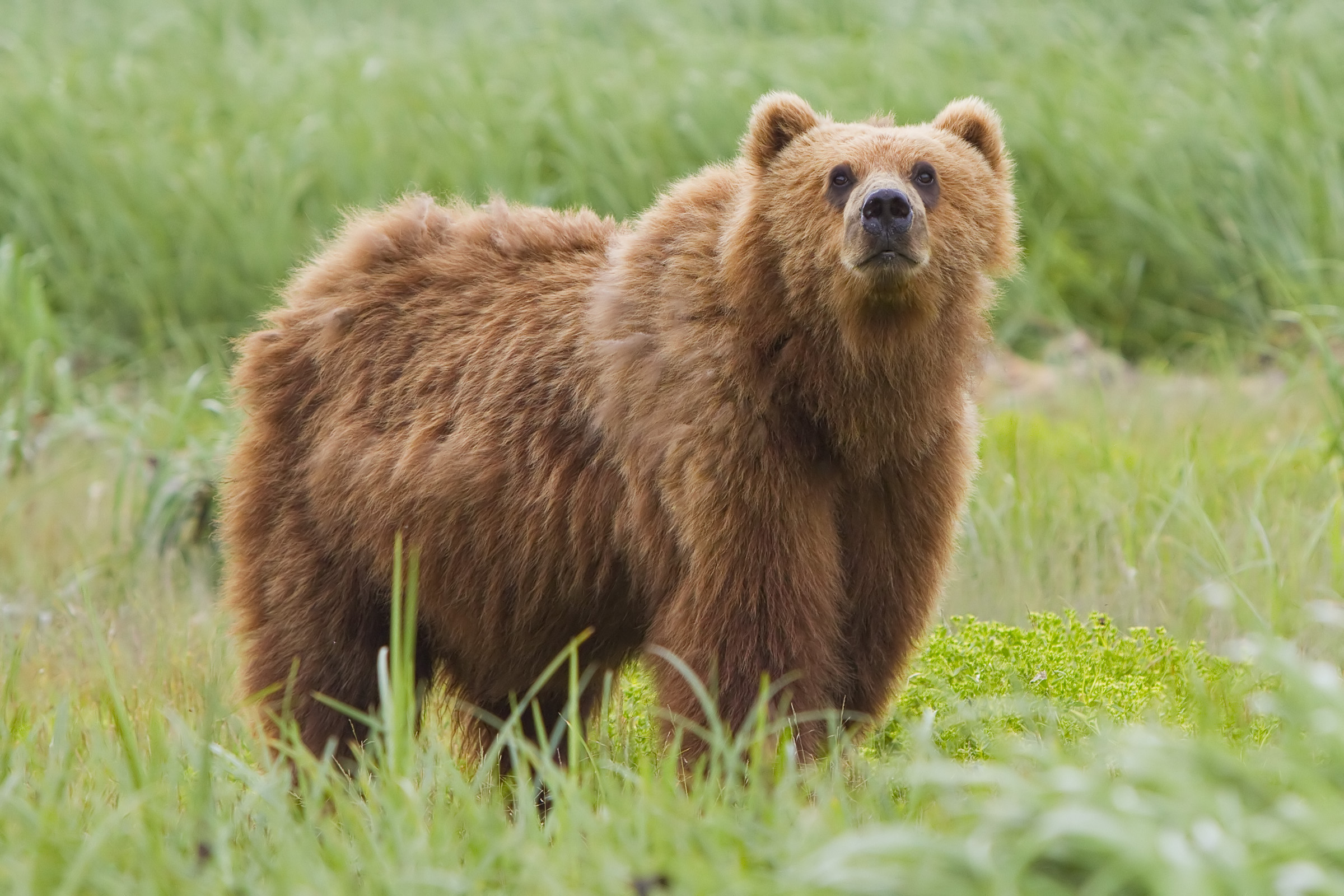
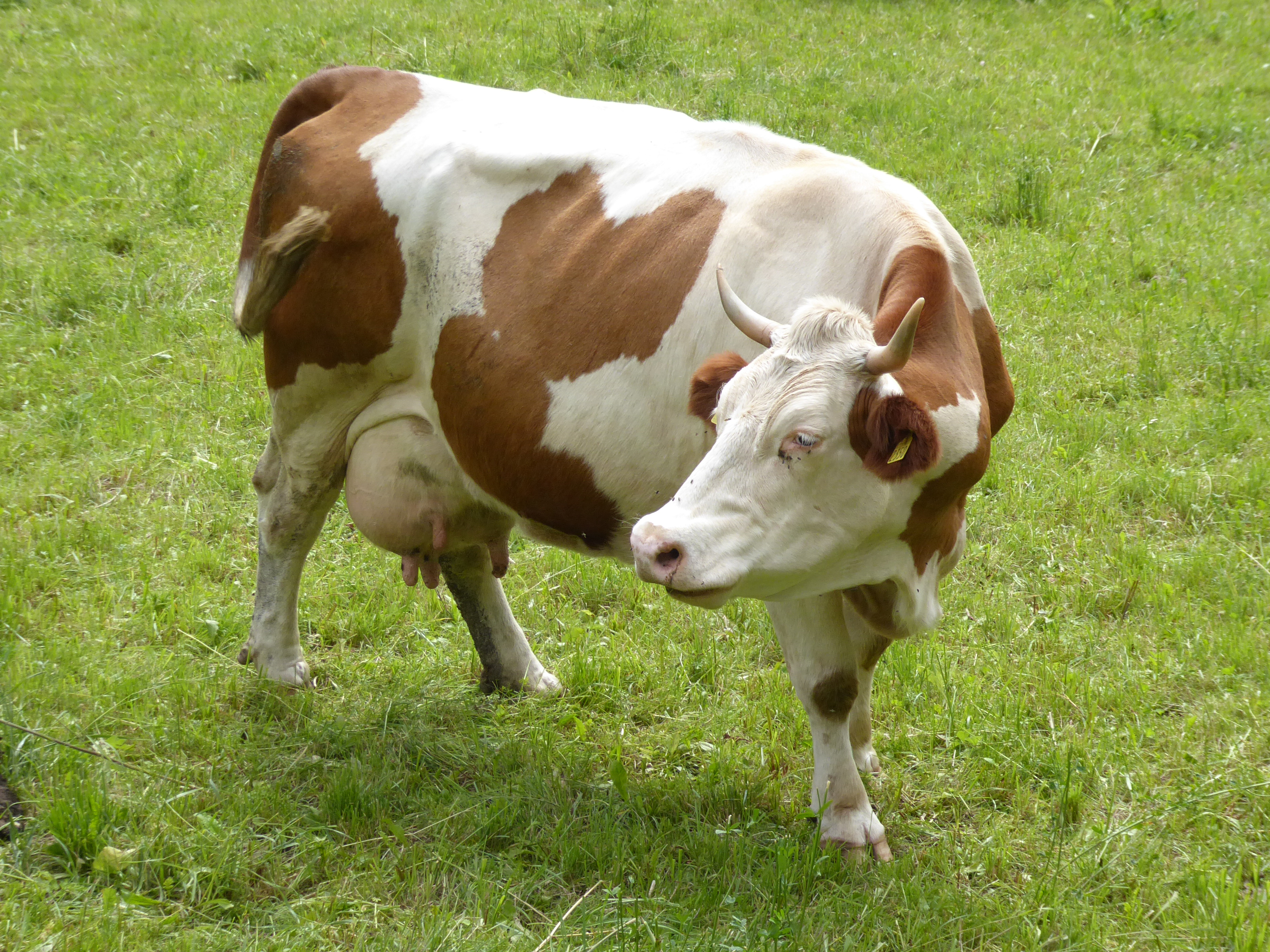
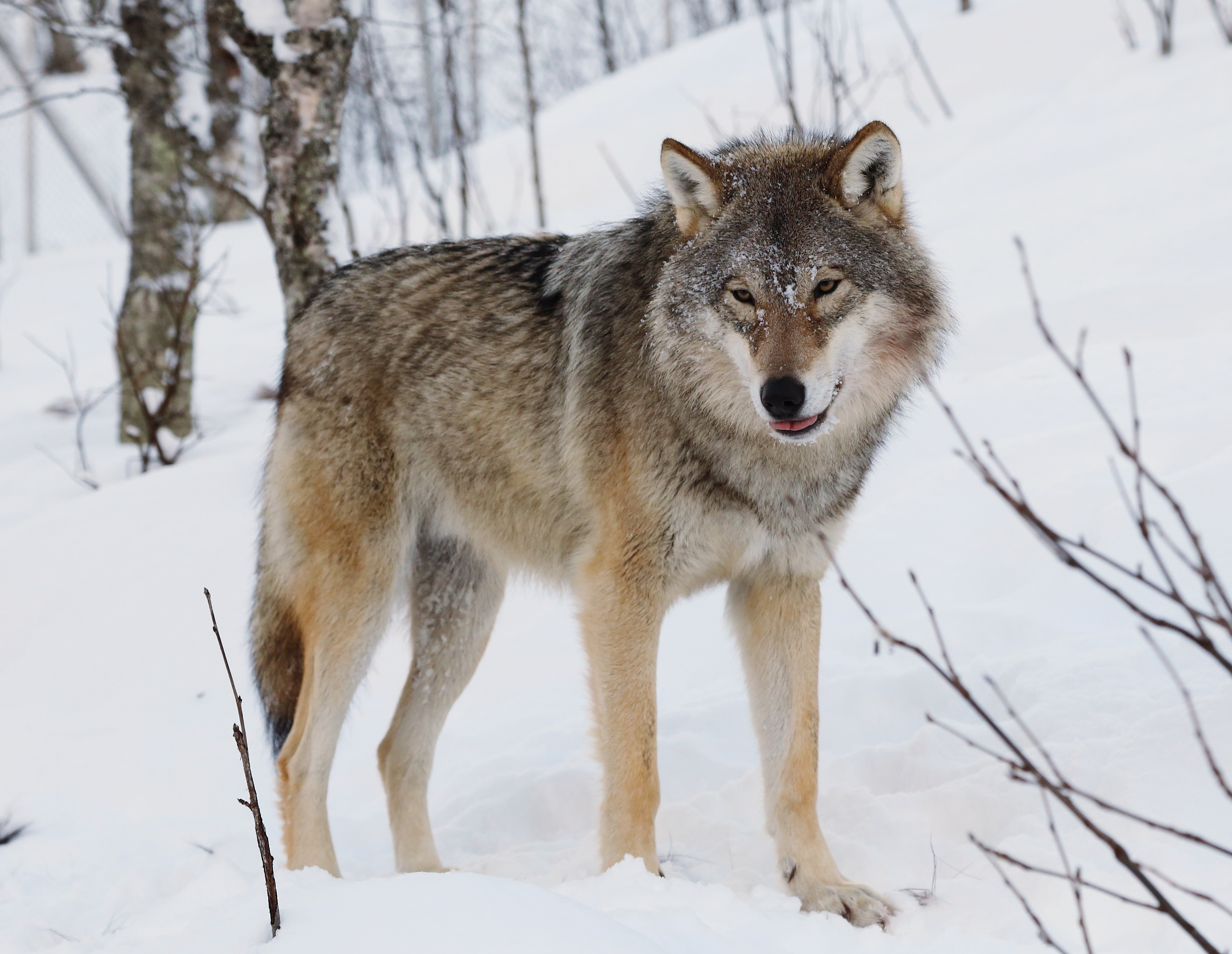
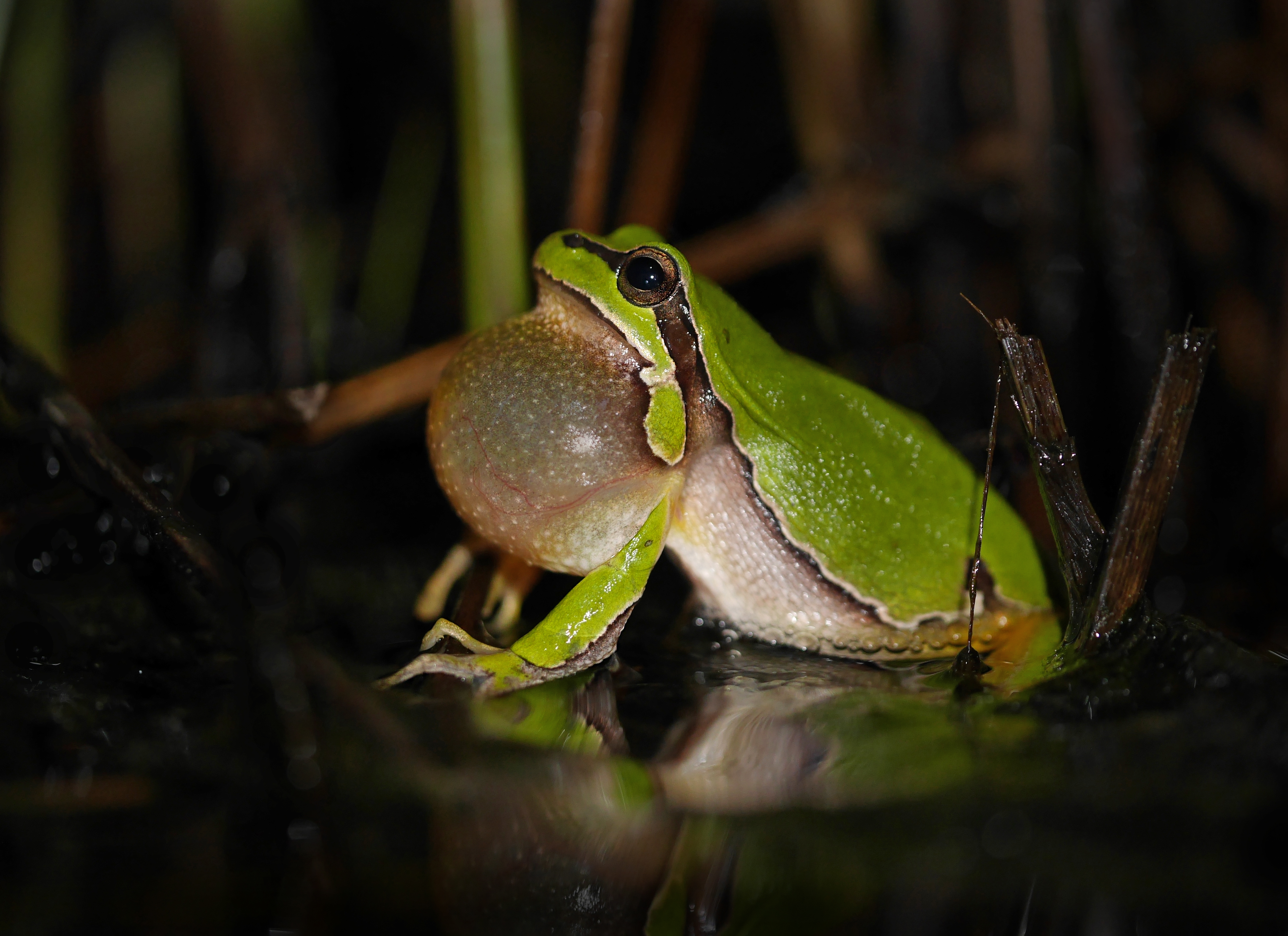
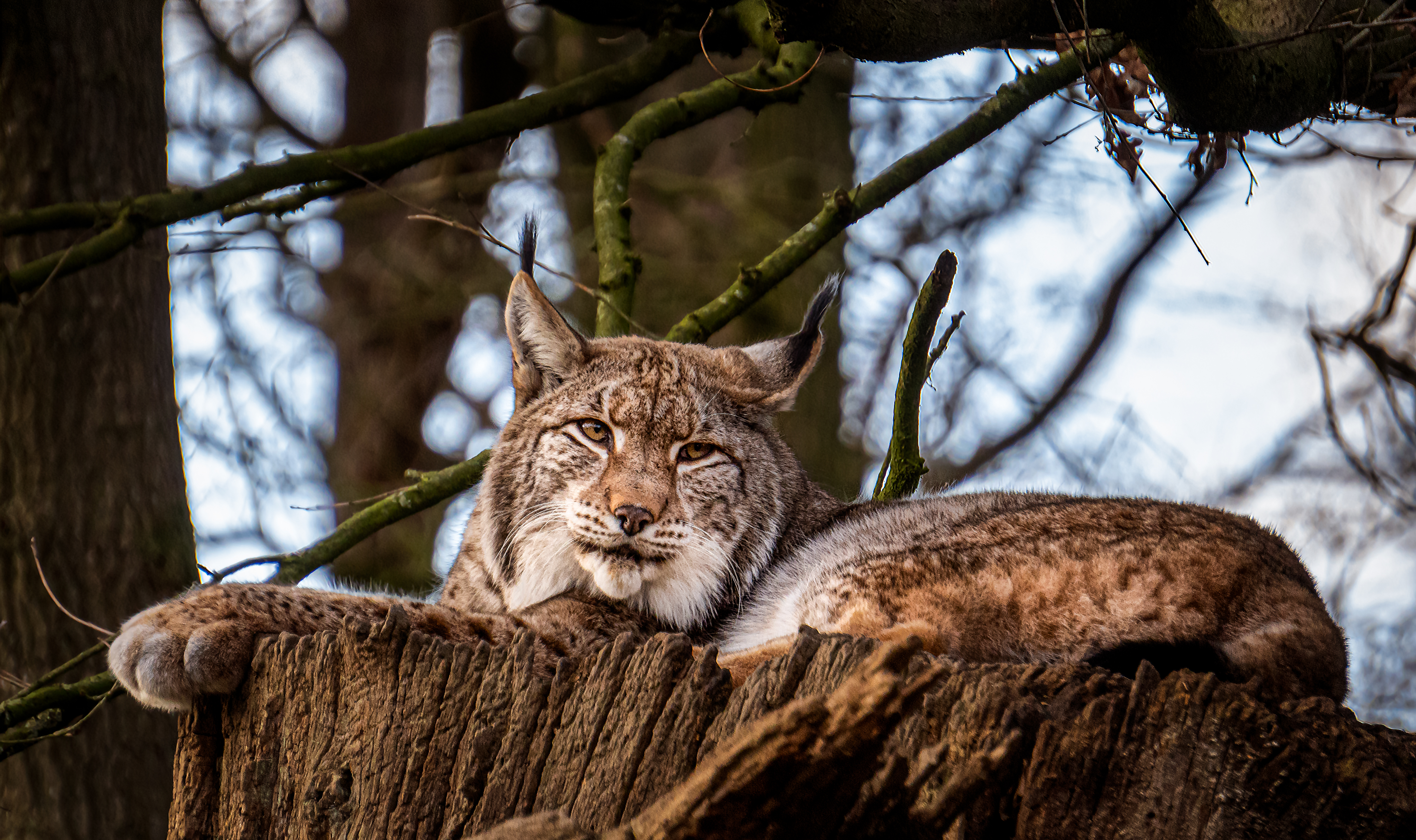
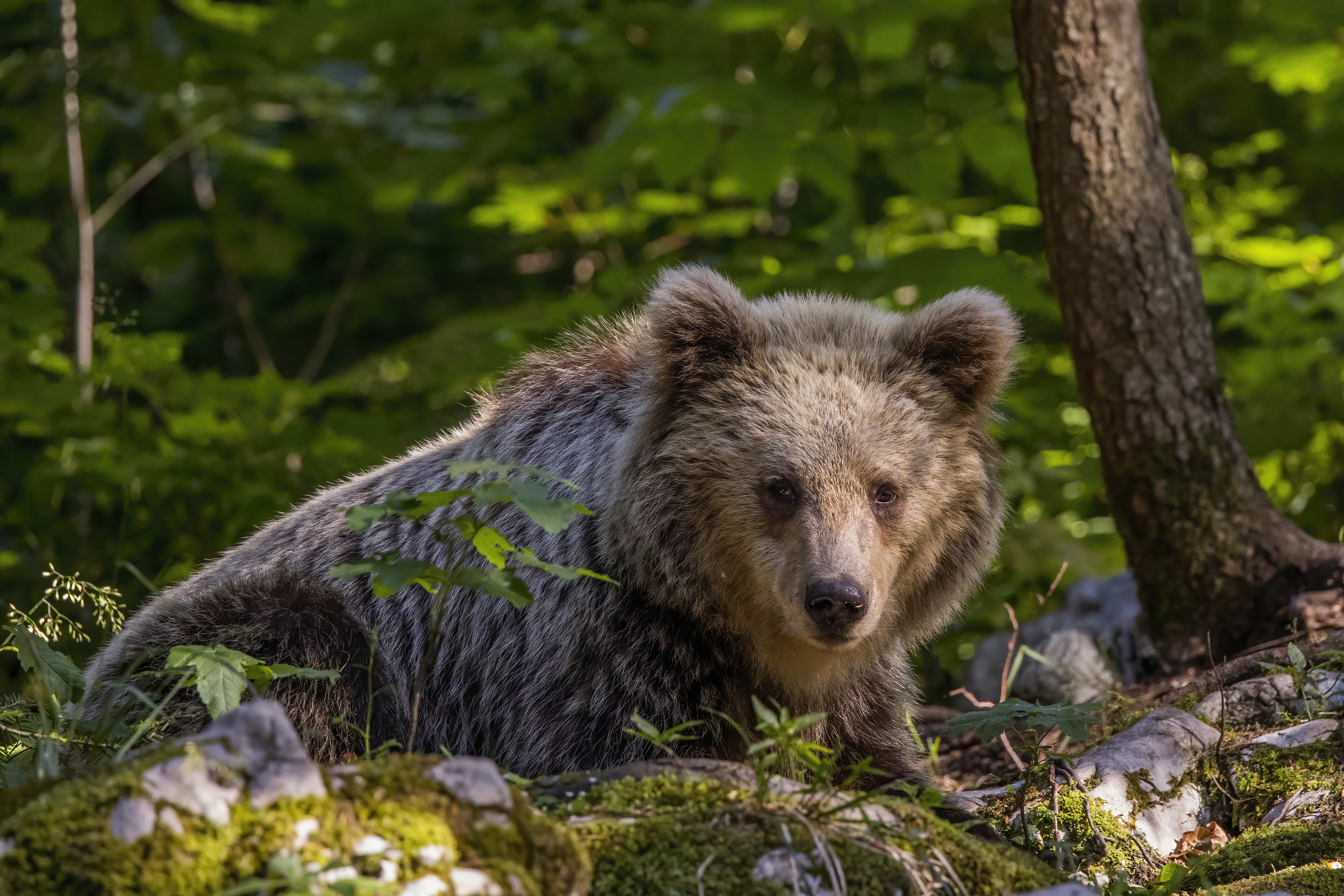
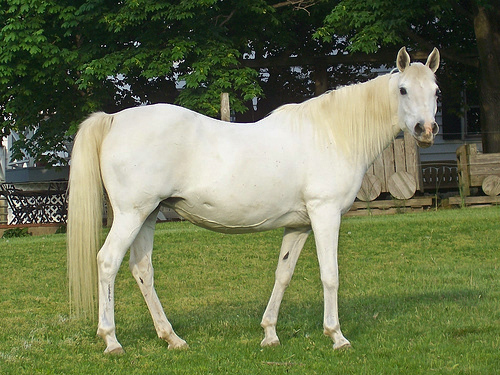
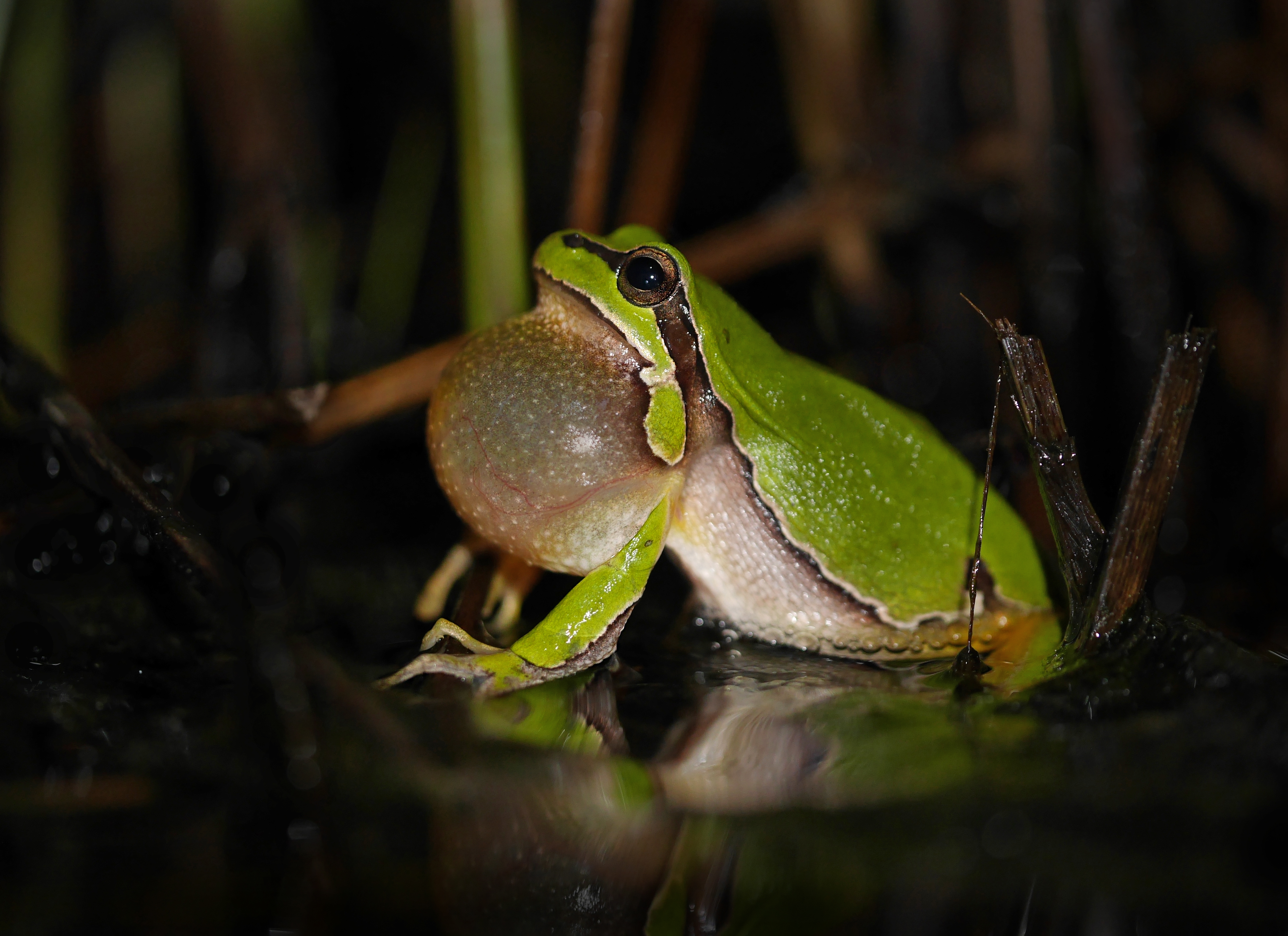
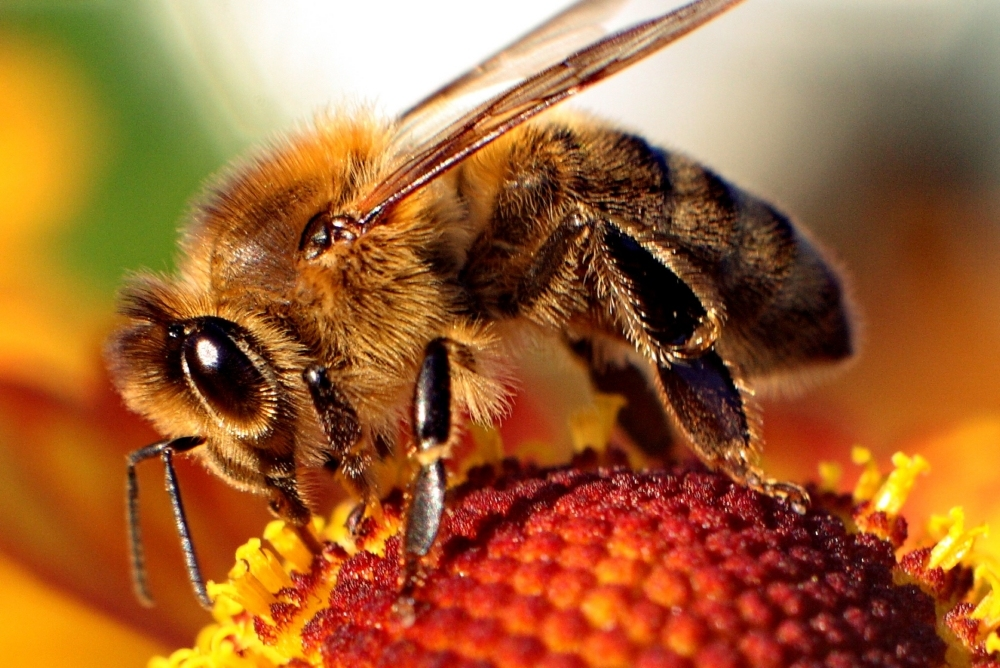
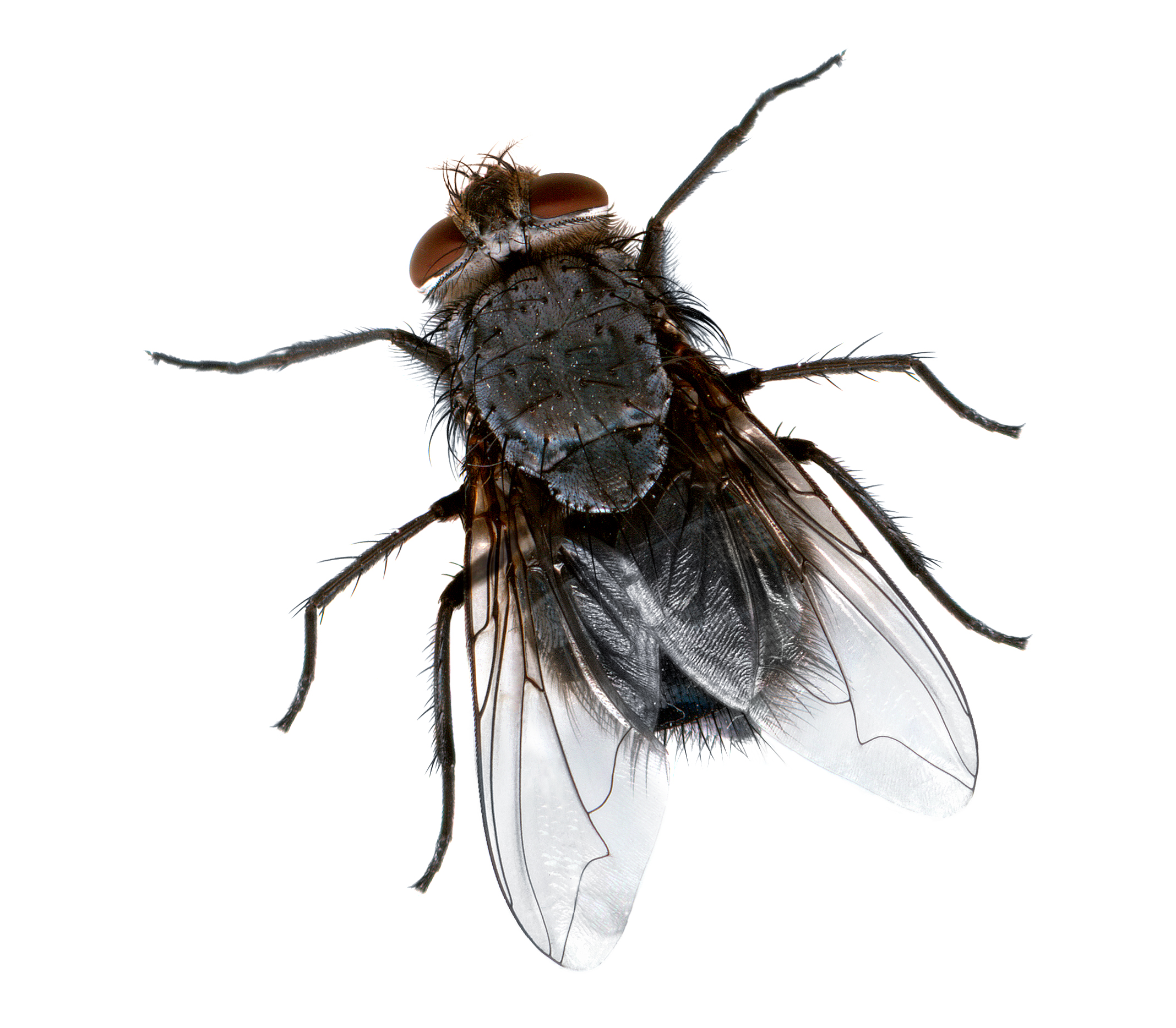
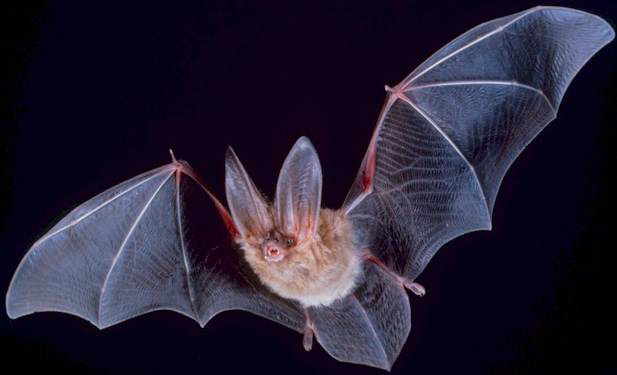
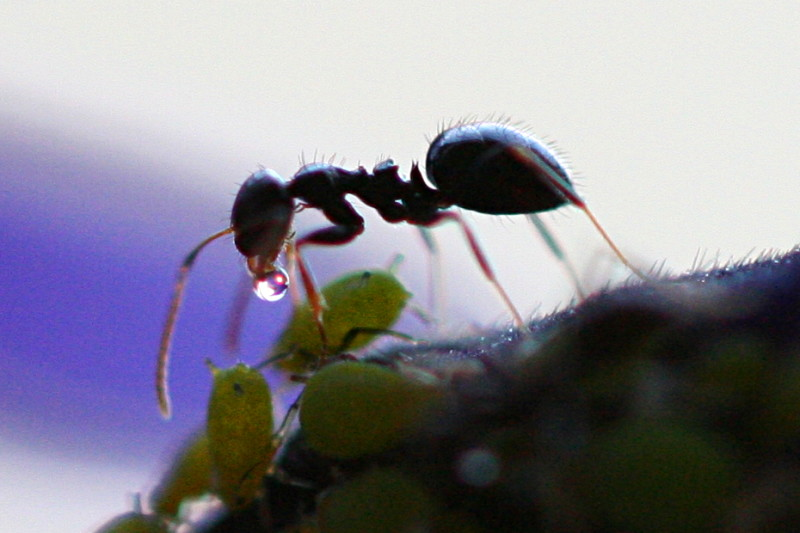
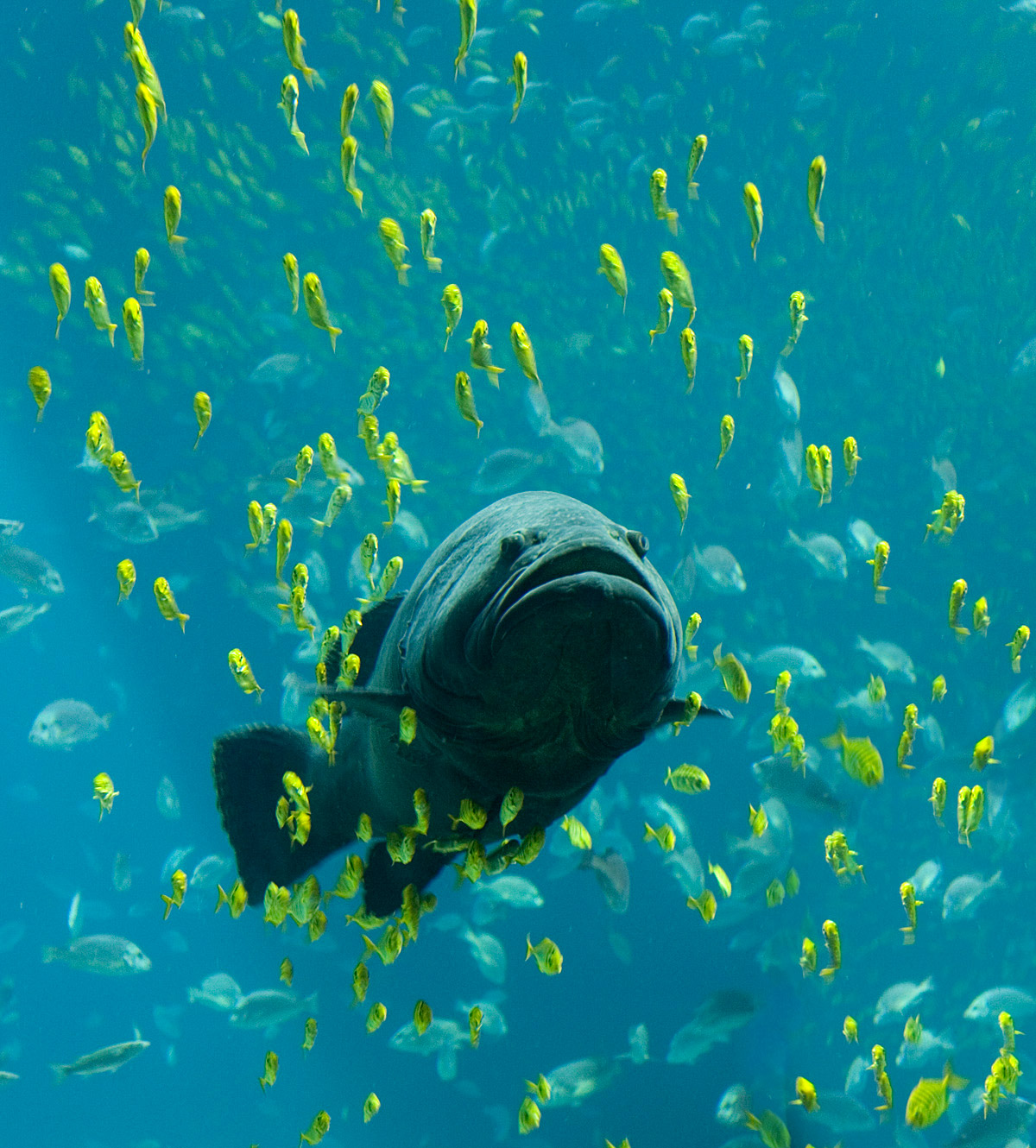
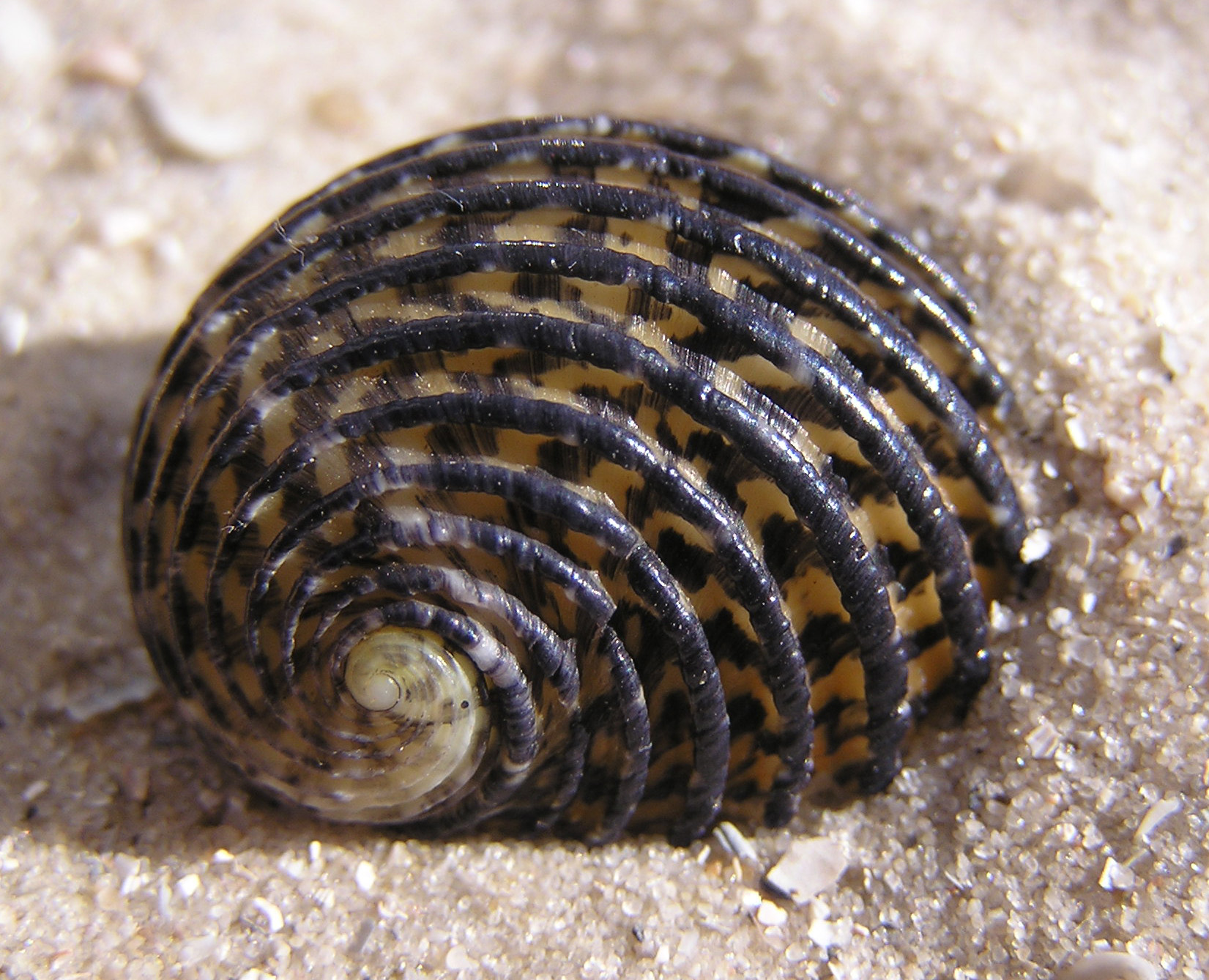
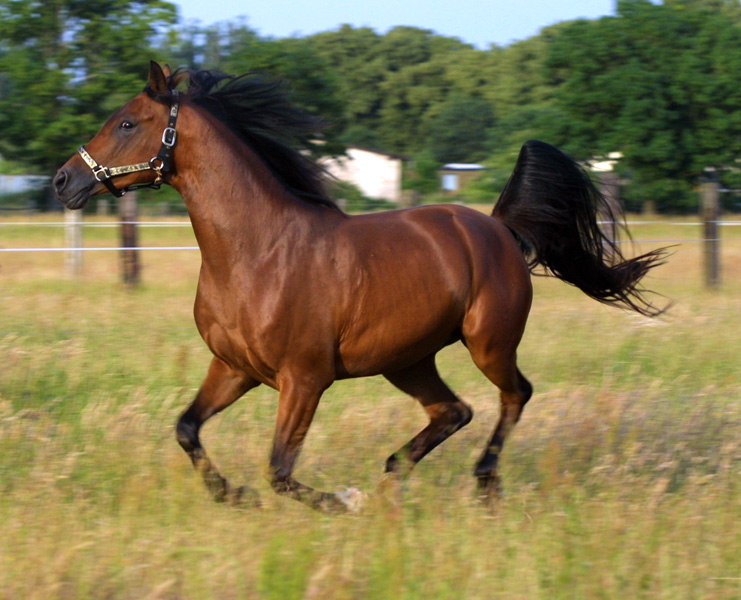
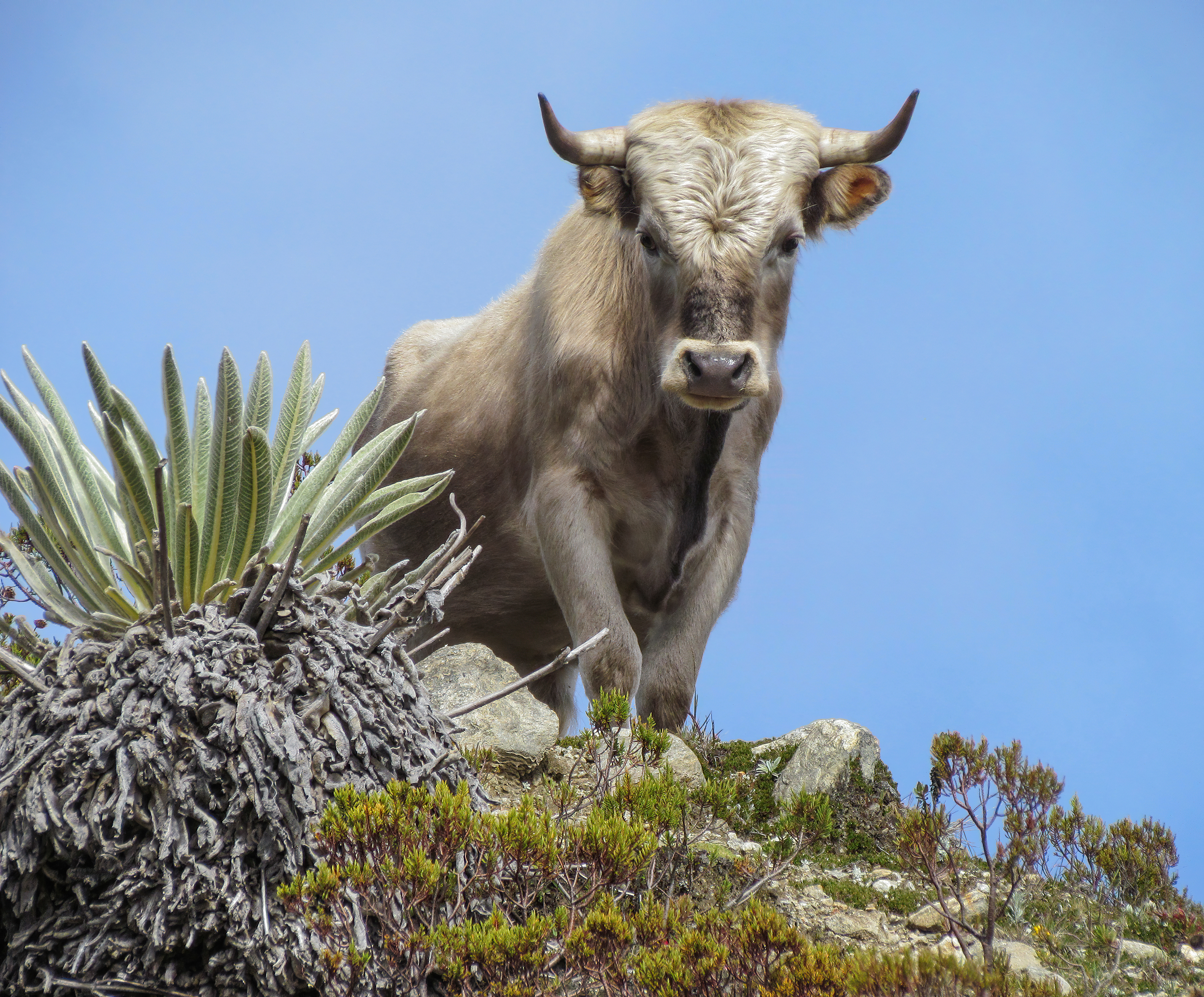
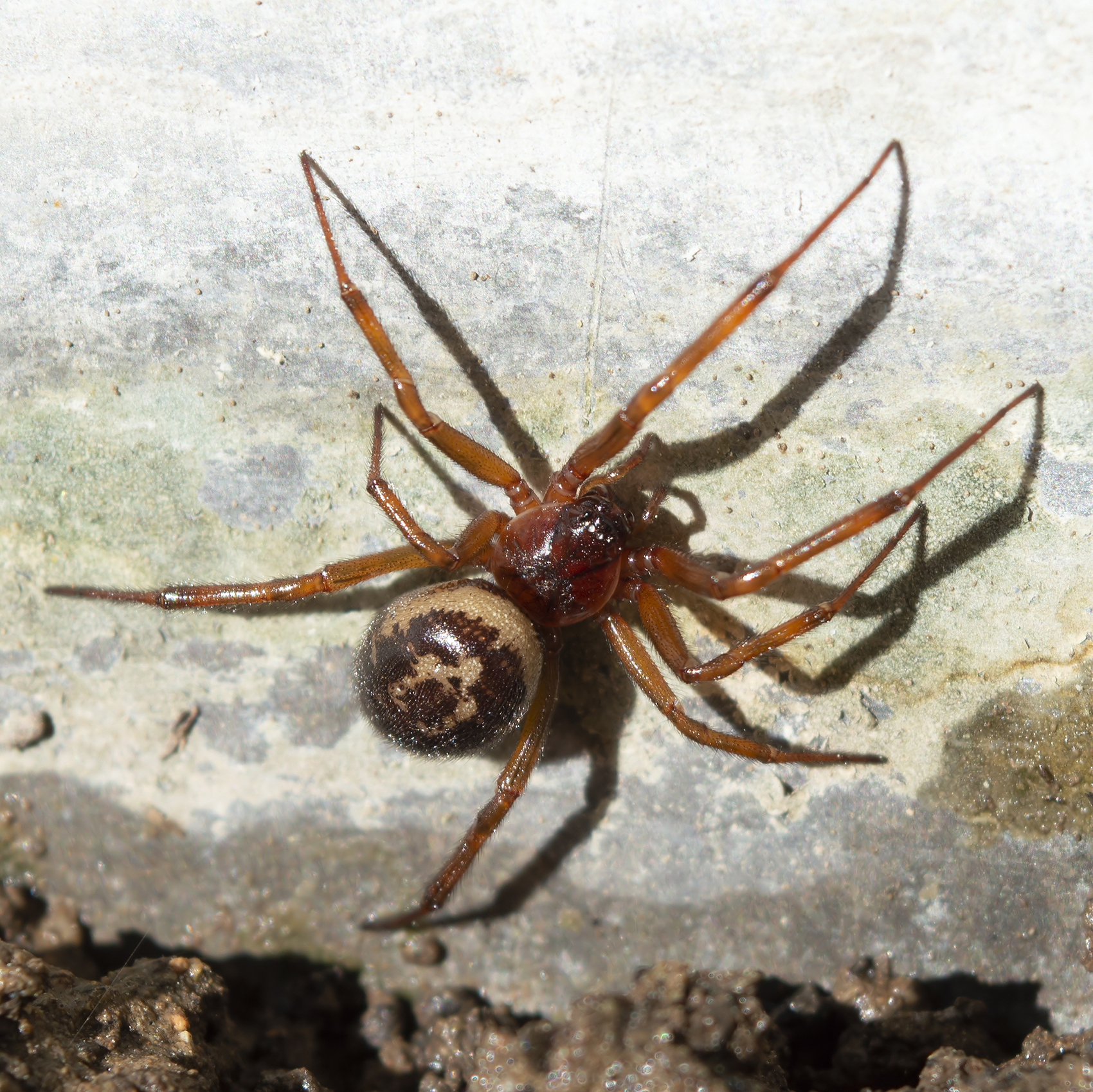
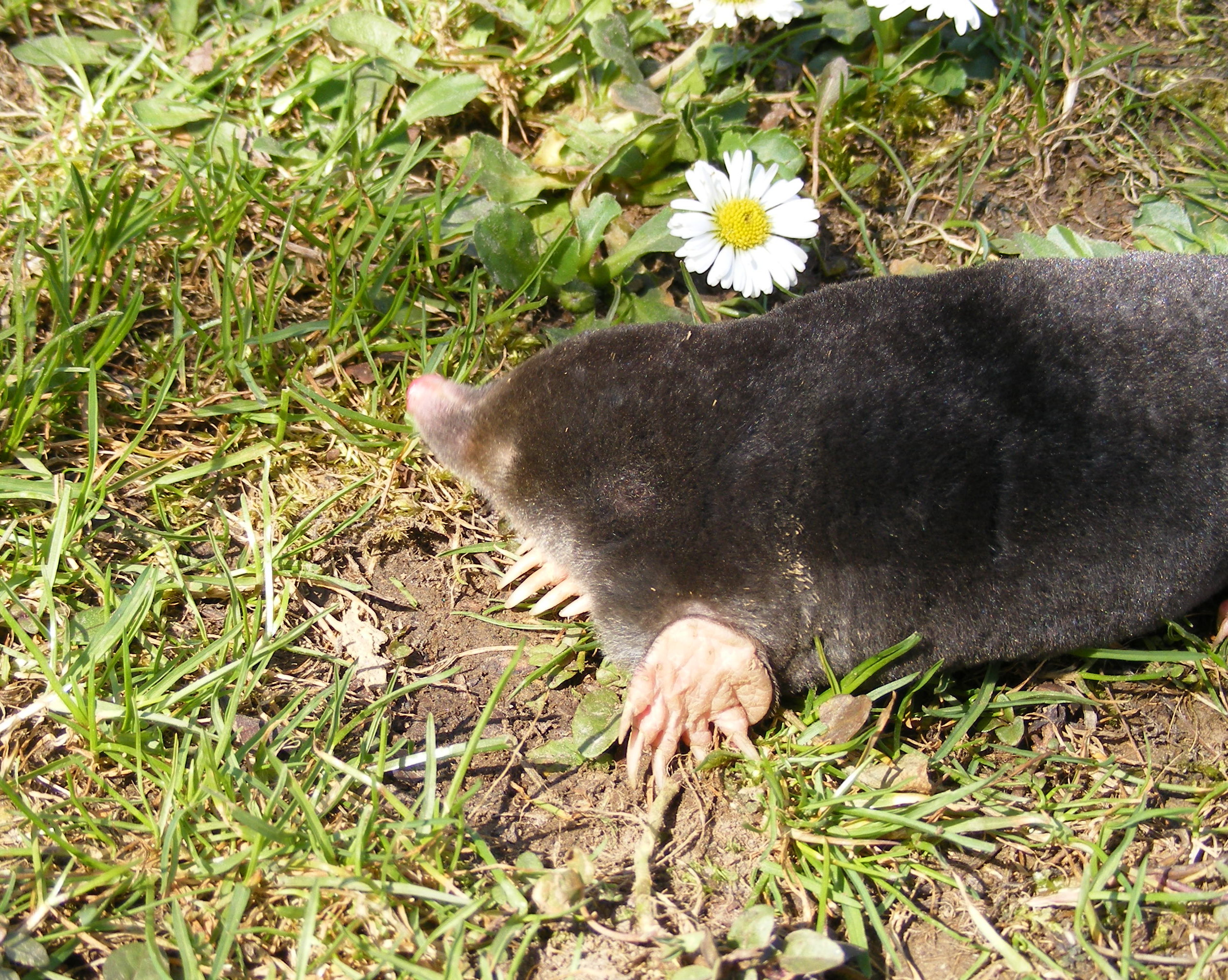
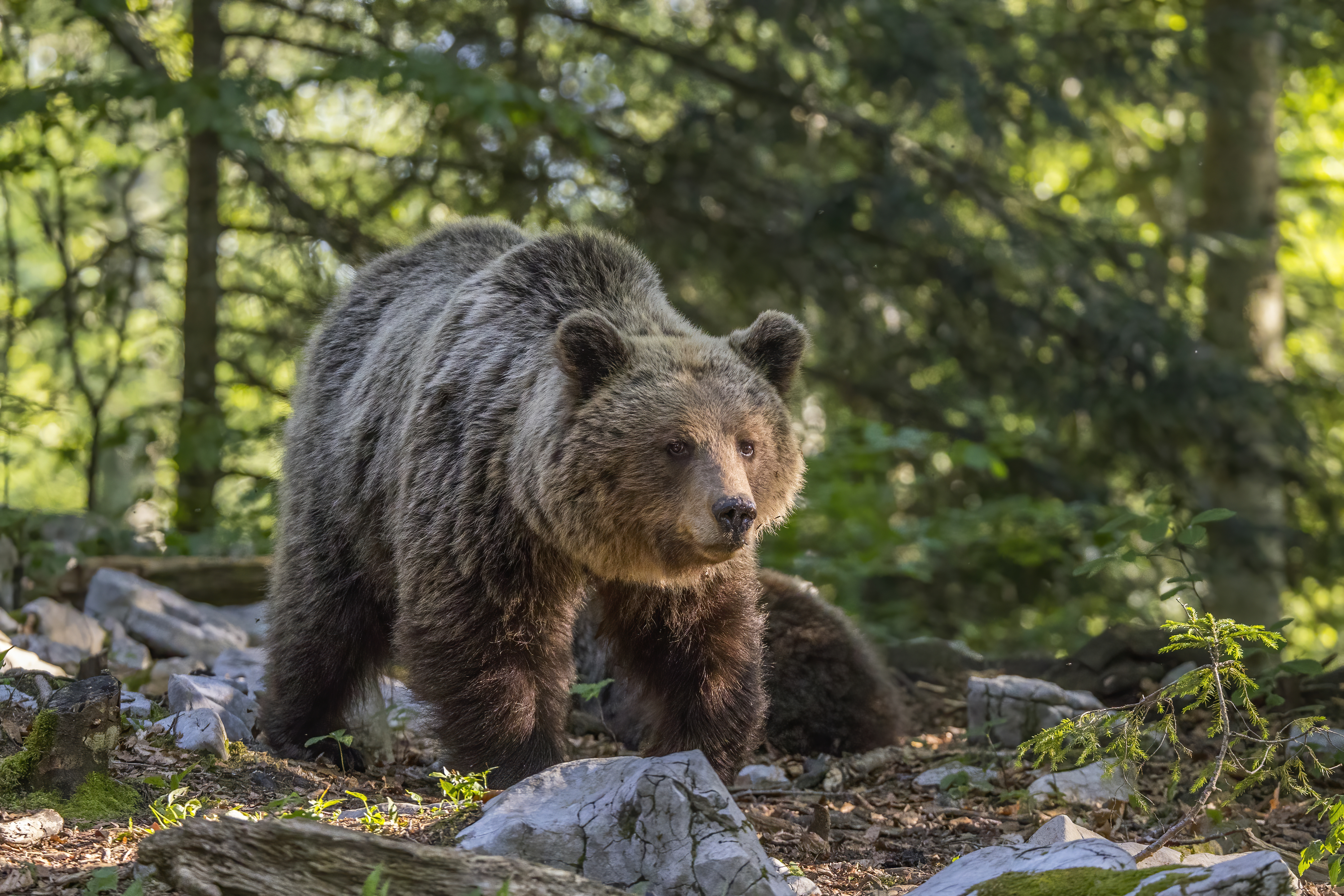
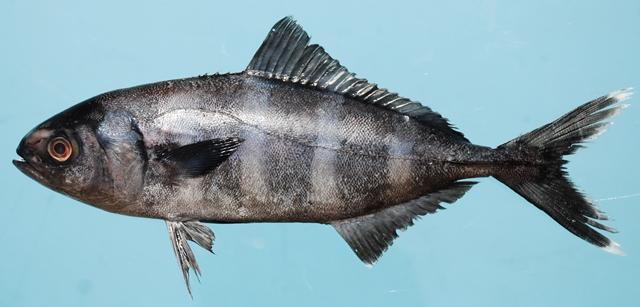
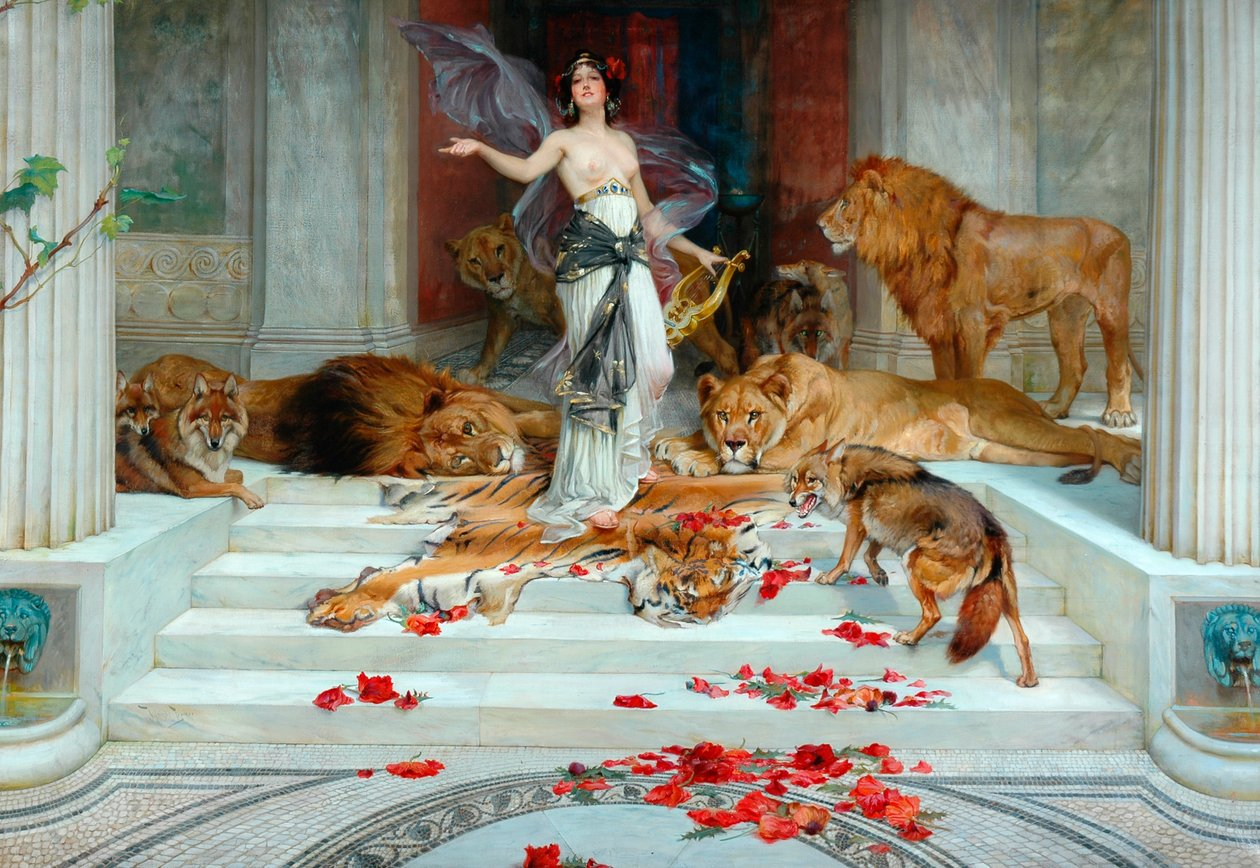
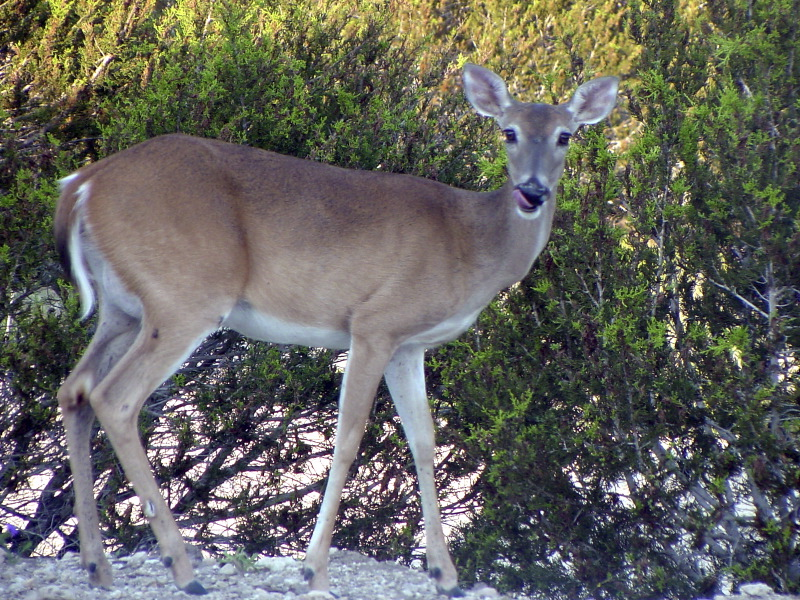
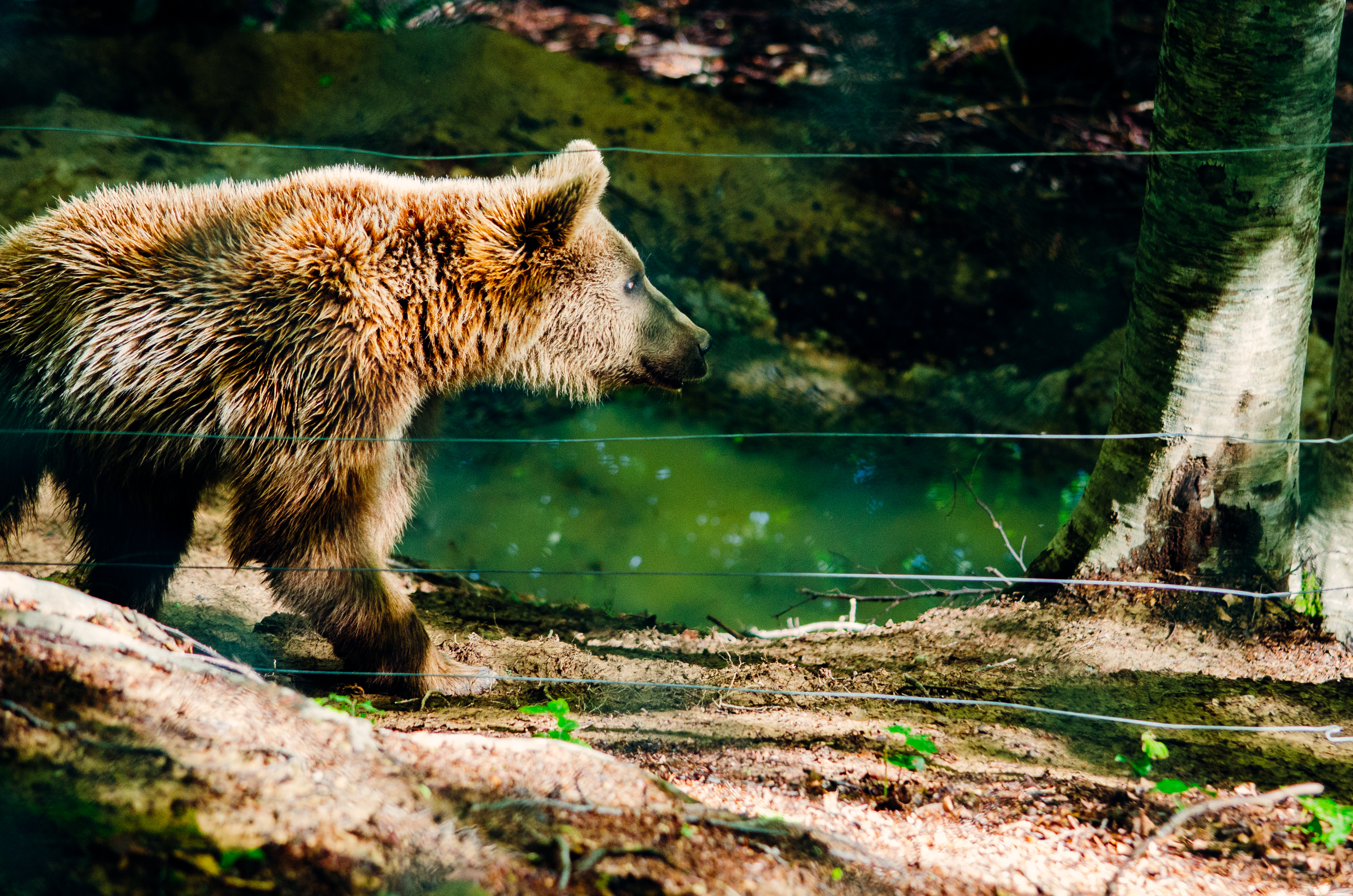
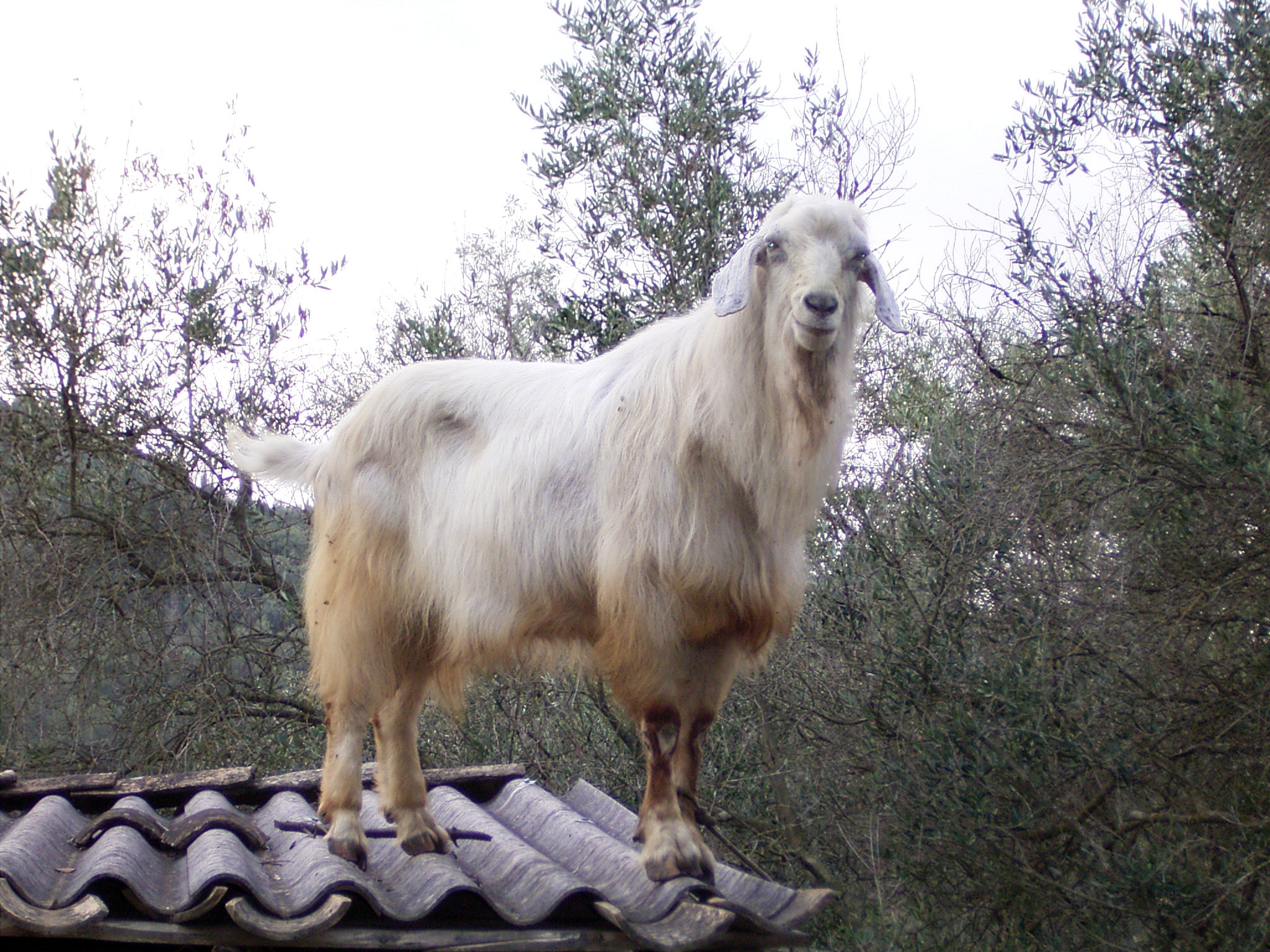
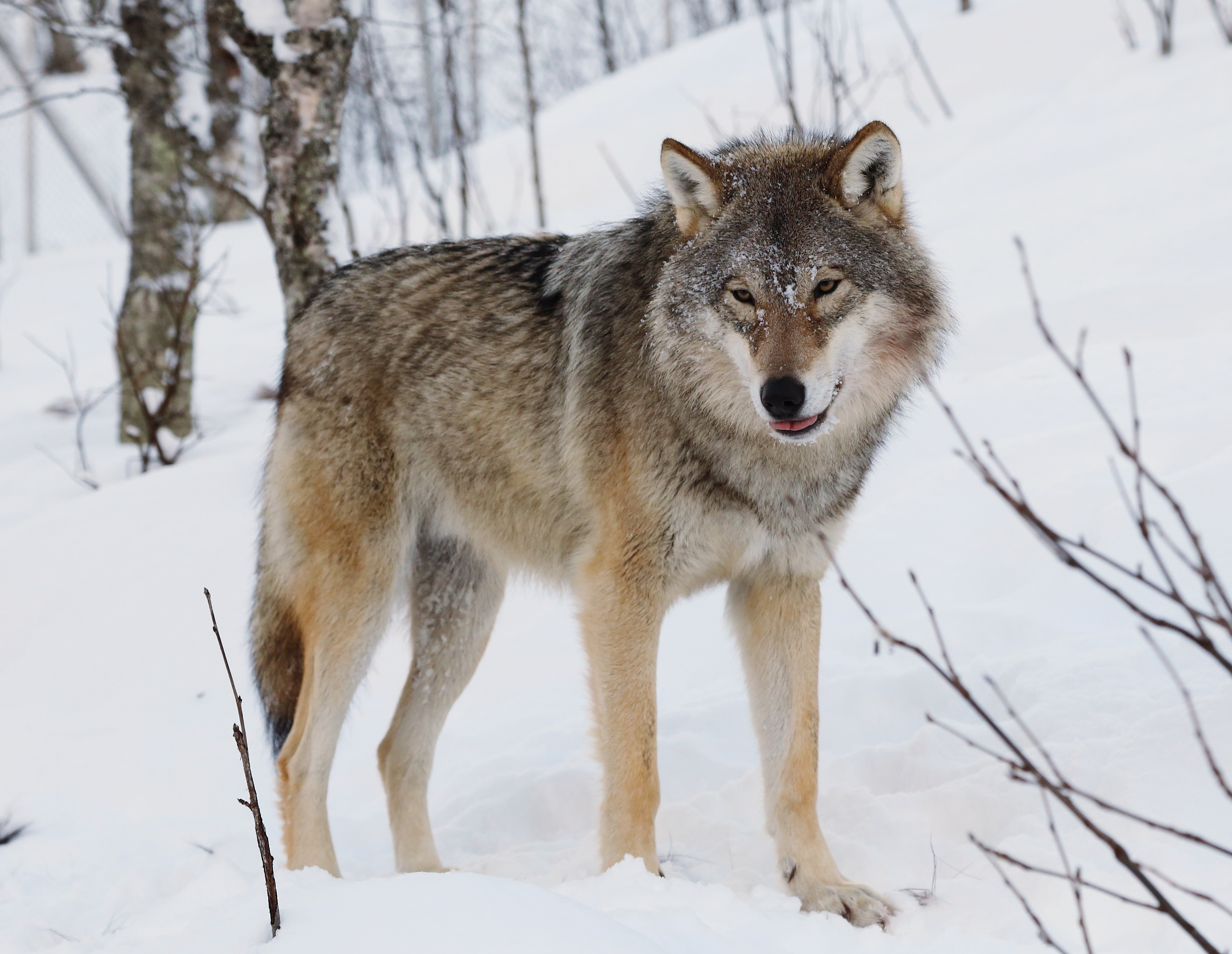
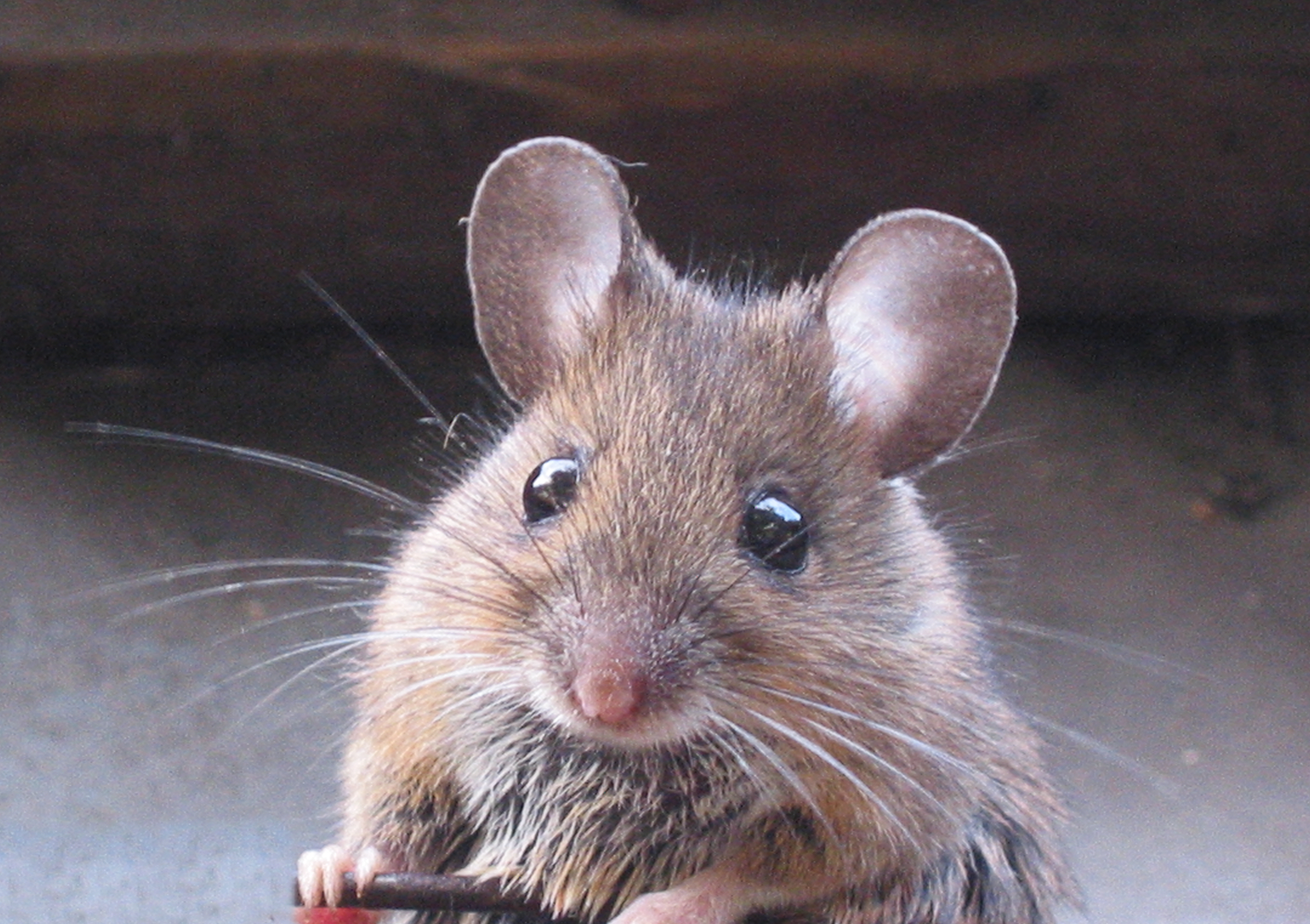
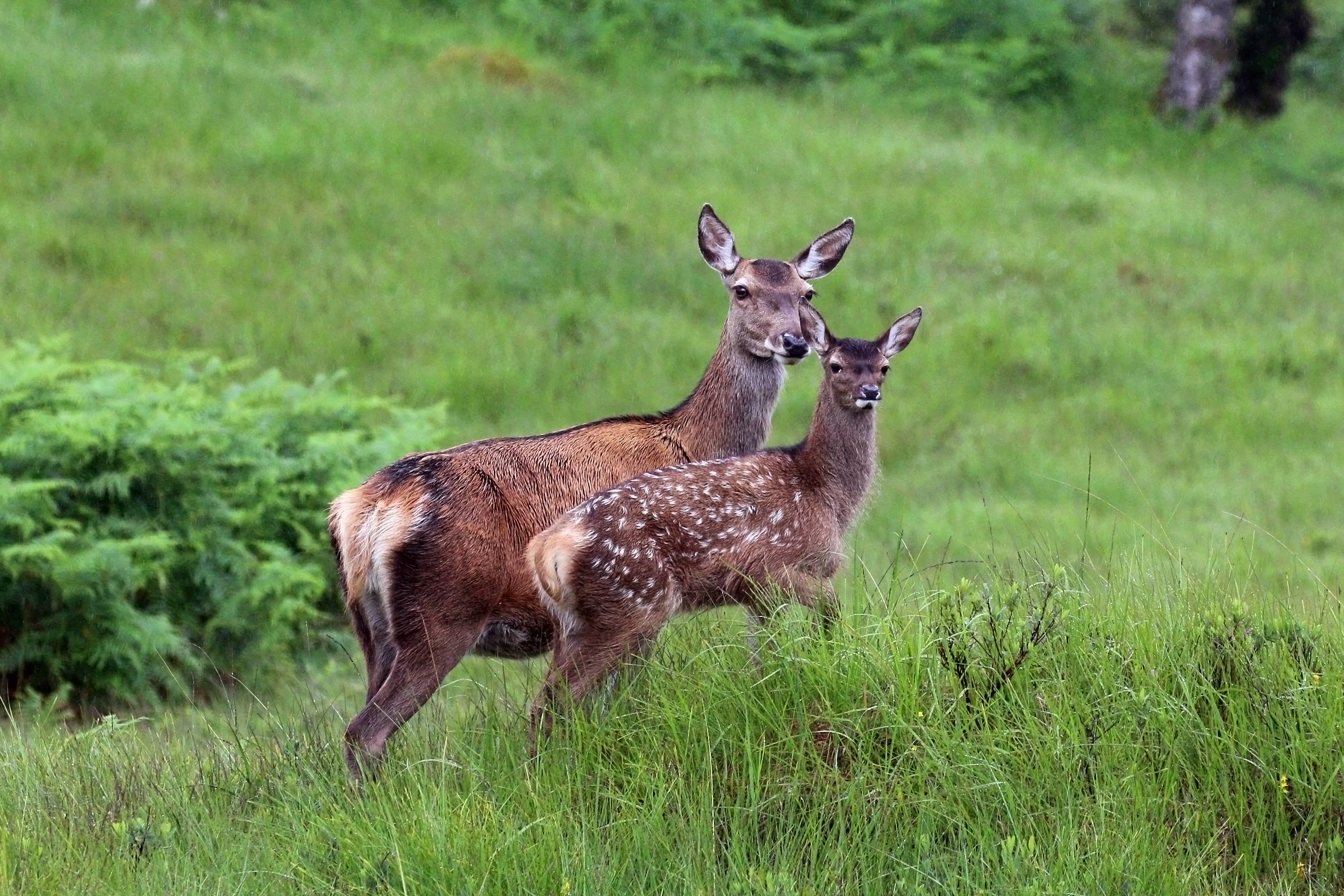
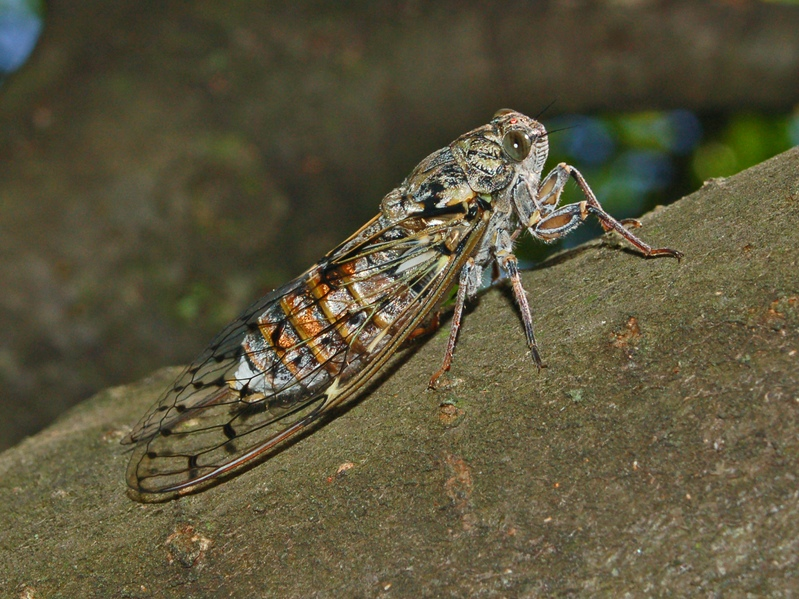
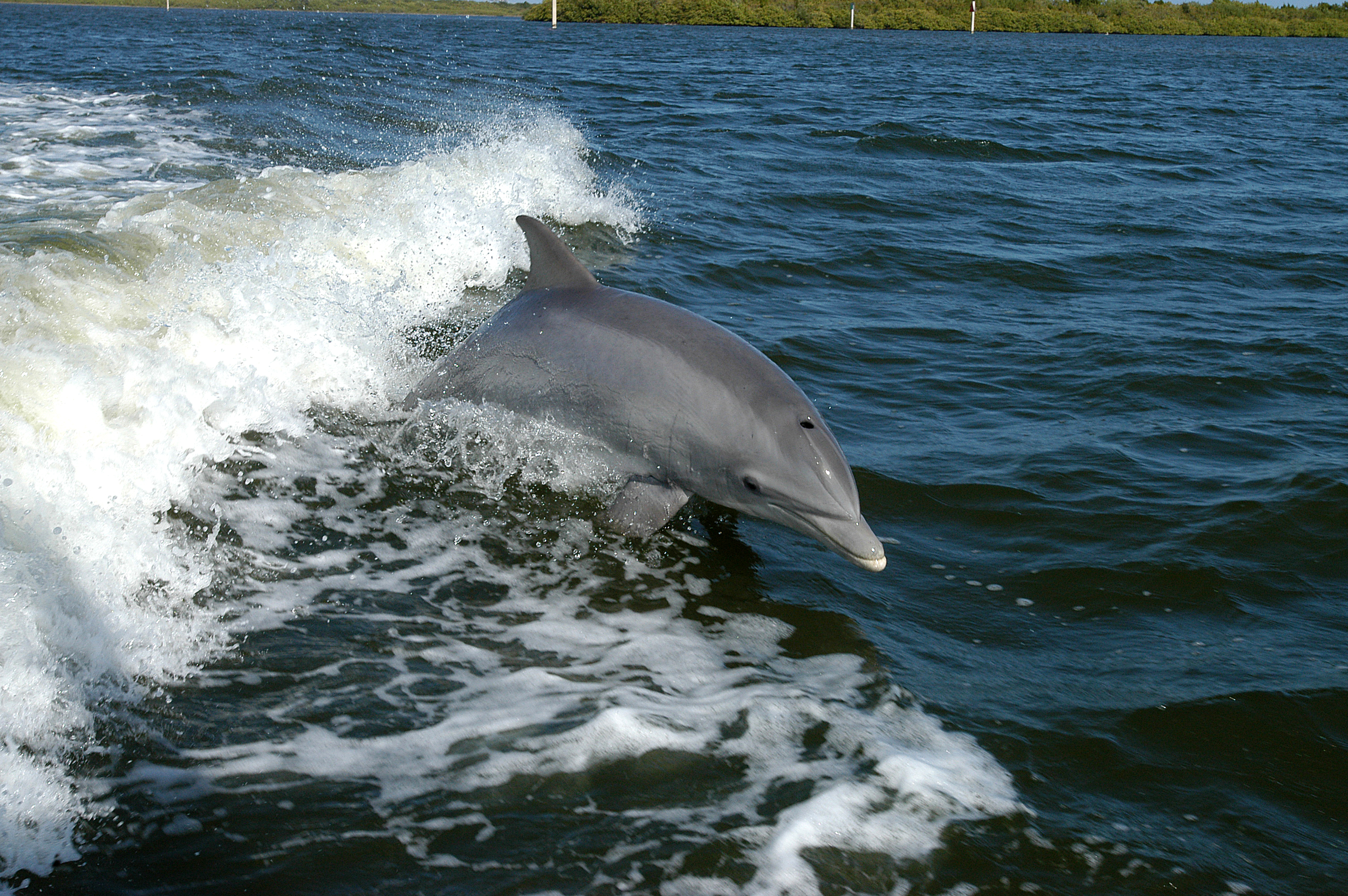
Who?	Into what?	By whom?	Notes	Image
Actaeon	Stag	Artemis	Actaeon was a hunter who walked into the hunt goddess Artemis bathing naked. Angered over the insolence, the goddess splashed water at him, immediately turning him into a stag (who was then devoured by his own hunting dogs as he tried to escape).
Arachne ("spider")	Spider	Athena	Arachne was a Lydian girl noted for her talent in weaving. When she bragged of being a better weaver than Athena herself, the goddess challenged her. In their contest, Arachne drew various instances of gods seducing mortal women, which enraged Athena, who then proceeded to beat Arachne. Arachne then tried to hang herself, but Athena turned her into a spider, sparing her life, and allowing her to continue to practice her passion, after a certain fashion.
Arcas	Bear	Zeus	Arcas was the son of Zeus and Callisto, who was transformed into a bear for laying with Zeus. In one version, Callisto's grown up son Arcas encountered his mother (now in bear form) in the woods, and, not recognizing her, was about to kill her. Zeus then transformed him into a bear as well, and in time transferred him into the stars as the constellation Ursa Minor.
Arge	Doe	Helios	Arge was a young huntress who, while hunting down a stag, remarked that although it was as fast as the sun, she would eventually catch up to him. Helios, offended, turned the girl into a doe.
Aristaeus	Dung beetle	Unclear (Gaia?)	Aristaeus was one of the Giants that attacked the gods during the Gigantomachy, and apparently was the only one among them that survived the battle. He was changed into a beetle in his homeland, Mount Aetna.
Ascalabus	Gecko	Demeter	While looking for Persephone, Demeter came into a town where she was offered a cup of water. Exhausted as she was, she drank clumsily, and a young man named Ascalabus made fun of her. So Demeter turned him into a gecko, and favours those who kill geckos. In another tradition, his name was Abas.
Atalanta and Melanion/Hippomenes	Lions	Rhea/Cybele or Zeus	Although Aphrodite assisted Melanion/Hippomenes into tricking Atalanta into marrying him, Melanion did not thank her properly. So, when the couple was near a temple of either Zeus or Rhea/Cybele, Aphrodite inspired great passion for each other in them, leading them to couple inside the holy temple. The offended deity, in fury, turned them both into lions.
Cadmus and Harmonia	Serpents	The gods	Cadmus, the mythological founder of Thebes and his wife, the goddess Harmonia, were both transformed into snakes near the end of Cadmus' life and then transferred to Elysium by the will of Zeus, where they lived together for all time.
Calchus	Pig then back a man	Circe	During the time that Circe was hosting Odysseus and his crew, a Daunian king named Calchus arrived in her island and fell in love with her. But Circe, who preferred Odysseus, turned him into a pig and only transformed him back and set him free once he promised to never return or bother her again.
Callisto	Bear	Artemis or Hera	Callisto was a princess of Arcadia, the daughter of Lycaon, who joined the goddess Artemis' retinue, and took a vow to remain a virgin forever, just like her patron goddess. Zeus however slept with her (in some versions, he deceived her by taking the form of Artemis herself, or perhaps Apollo) and left her pregnant. Artemis as well as Hera were enraged; depending on version, either of the two goddesses transformed Callisto into a bear. Eventually, Zeus transferred Callisto to the stars, as the constellation Ursa Major.
Cephissus's grandson	Seal	Apollo	Under unknown circumstances, Apollo transformed the unnamed grandson of the river-god Cephissus into a seal. Cephissus mourned greatly over that.
Cerambus	Cerambyx	Nymphs	Cerambus was a youth who survived Deucalion's flood, but had excessive pride. He would often insult the nymphs and spread outrageous tales about some gods, like Poseidon. The nymphs changed him into a wood-gnawing Cerambyx beetle.
Cerastae	Bulls	Aphrodite	The Cerastae were a people in Cyprus who offered to Zeus human sacrifice in the form of slaughtered guests. For breaking two taboos, the Cypriot goddess Aphrodite punished them by turning them all into bulls.
Cercopes	Monkeys	Zeus	The Cercopes were a pair of unlawful and uncivilized brothers who were turned into monkeys by Zeus. In another version, they challenged Heracles instead and were turned into stone.
Chelone ("tortoise")	Tortoise	Hermes	When Zeus and Hera were to be married, they invited everyone to their wedding, but one girl, Chelone, did not deign to appear, and mocked the wedding. Zeus and Hera sent Hermes to her, who changed her into the animal bearing her name.
Crumissa's citizens	Cattle	Poseidon	When Poseidon carried Theophane off, he transformed her into a ewe, himself a ram, and the people of Crumissa (the island he transferred Theophane to) into cattle.
Curetes	Lions	Cronus	The Cretan Curetes had been tasked by the goddess Rhea to guard her infant son Zeus while he was kept hidden from his father Cronus who intended to eat him. Cronus turned the Curetes into lions, but Rhea yoked them in her chariot as her sacred animals, and Zeus made the lion the king of all animals.
Cynosura	Bear	Zeus	Cynosura was one of the several nymphs that brought up the young Zeus during the years he was hiding from his father in Crete. One day that Cronus came to Crete looking for Zeus, Zeus transformed into a serpent, Cynosura and Helice into bears, so they could hide from him. Once he became king, he transferred Cynosura to the stars, as Ursa Minor.
Dionysus's nurses	Leopards	Dionysus	Dionysus transformed his nurses at their own request into leopards so they could tear apart Pentheus, the unjust king of Thebes who tried to outlaw the worship of Dionysus. (Note: This tale is from Oppian, who gave literal forms to the metaphors and delusions that were presented in The Bacchae by Euripides.)
Ephesus' wife	Dog	Artemis	When Ephesus hosted Artemis, his wife cast the goddess away. Artemis turned her into a dog, but in pity she gave her back her human form. The woman then hanged herself in shame. Artemis put her own ornament around her and renamed her to Hecate.
Galanthis	Weasel	Hera	When Alcmene's labour started, Hera sent the childbirth goddess Eileithyia to halt the process, preventing Alcmene from giving birth to Heracles and Iphicles, and causing her great pain and distress. Galanthis, a servant, noticing Eileithyia sitting with her legs crossed, announced that Alcmene had given birth. Eileithyia jumped in surprise, allowing the twins to be born. Enraged, Hera turned Galanthis into a weasel.
Gale ("weasel")	Polecat	Hecate	Gale was a powerful witch with great talent in spells and herbs, but she was inflicted with "abnormal sexual desires". The goddess of witchcraft Hecate, disgusted with her, turned her into a polecat.
Hecuba	Dog	Hecate	Hecuba, the queen of Troy and wife of King Priam, following the fall of Troy at the hands of the Greeks, was given as prize of war to Odysseus. In one version, as they had stationed in Thrace, Hecate took pity in the former queen and transformed her into a female dog, who then ran way and escaped.
Helice	Bear	Zeus	Helice was one of the several nymphs that brought up the young Zeus during the years he was hiding from his father in Crete. One day that Cronus came to Crete looking for Zeus, Zeus transformed into a serpent, Helice and Cynosura into bears, so they could hide from him. Once he became king, he transferred Helice to the stars, as the constellation Ursa Major.
Io	Cow, then back into woman	Zeus	Zeus fell in love with the Argive princess Io, but Hera was quick to notice her husband's infidelity, so Zeus transformed the girl into a cow to hide her from her. Hera sent a gadfly to torment Io through the entire Mediterranean; Io only turned back into a human after Zeus begged Hera to let her go.
Lycaon ("wolf")	Wolf	Zeus	A king of Arcadia, Lycaon, once invited Zeus over for dinner. Lycaon butchered and served Zeus one of his own sons, or alternatively Arcas, Zeus' own son by Lycaon's daughter Callisto. Zeus punished Lycaon by turning him into a wolf.
Lycian peasants	Frogs	Leto	Some peasants in Lycia prevented Leto and her newborn twins from drinking from a pond in Lycia, and meddled the water, stirring the mud in the bottom so it was undrinkable. Leto, in anger, turned them all into frogs, forever doomed to swim in the murky waters of ponds and rivers.
Lyncus	Lynx	Demeter	Demeter sent Triptolemus to spread the knowledge of agriculture and seeds all over the world. He came to the halls of King Lyncus, who welcomed him and offered him hospitality. But as Triptolemus lay in bed sleeping, Lyncus attacked him with a sword with the intent to kill him. Demeter intervened, saving Triptolemus' life and changing Lyncus into a lynx for his misdeeds.
Megisto	Bear	Unclear	Doublet of Callisto. The Arcadian princess Megisto suffered the same fate as Callisto and was transformed into a bear, which eventually rose to the sky as Ursa Major. In this version, the Kneeler represents her father who begs for Megisto to be returned to him.
Melanippe ("black horse")	Mare	Artemis	Melanippe, a daughter of Chiron, fell pregnant and fled to the mountains so that her father would not find out about her pregnancy. She prayed to Artemis, and Artemis transformed her into a mare. In other versions, the transformation was a punishment over some insult of Melanippe against Artemis. Melanippe's child, Arne, was born a foal as a result, but later in life acquired a human form. In the end Melanippe was transferred to the stars.
Melian nymphs	Frogs	Zeus	Zeus hated Euphorion, the winged son of Helen and Achilles, and with a blow he knocked him off the Isles of the Blessed onto Earth, whereupon he continued to pursue him. When the nymphs of Melos gave a burial to Euphorion, Zeus changed them all into frogs.
Melissa ("honey bee")	Honey bee	Zeus	Melissa was a nymph who reared the infant Zeus while he hid from his father. Under unknown circumstances, she was turned into a honey bee by Zeus.
Myia ("fly")	Fly	Selene	Myia was, according to satirical writer Lucian of Samosata, a young chatty girl who fell in love with Endymion and kept waking him up with her endless chatter, wishing to sway his affections toward her. This annoyed Endymion, and enraged Selene, the moon goddess and Endymion's lover, who then transformed Myia into a fly, which to this day annoys sleepers.
Minyades	Bats	Dionysus	Once the worship of Dionysus was introduced and established in Boeotia, and while the other women of the region were reveling and ranging over the mountains in honour of the god, the Minyades alone remained at home, devoting themselves to their usual occupations, and criticizing the other women. Dionysus punished them by changing all three of them into bats.
Myrmex ("ant")	Ant	Athena	Myrmex was a girl favoured by the goddess Athena. When she claimed to have come up with the plough, that Athena had actually invented, the goddess turned her into an ant.
Naïs and her lovers	Fishes	Herself	Naïs was a clever nymph who used all sorts of herbs to transform her suitors and lovers into various fishes, until eventually she too suffered the same fate and was metamorphosed into fish.
Nerites	Sea snail	Aphrodite or Helios	The only son of the sea gods Nereus and Doris who was turned into a shellfish. In one version, it was Aphrodite who changed him, because Nerites refused to follow her out of the sea, and in another it was Helios for unclear reasons (perhaps he too was rejected by Nerites).
Ocyrhoe	Horse	The gods (Zeus)	Ocyrhoe, the daughter of Chiron, foretold her father's exact fate to him, thereupon she was transformed into a mare right as she finished her prophecy.
Odysseus	Horse	Athena	In one version about the ending of Odysseus's tale, he is changed into a horse by his own patron-goddess Athena.
Pentheus	Bull	Dionysus	Dionysus transformed Pentheus the king of Thebes into a bull at the request of his nurses, who then, now transformed into leopards by the god, to attack him and tear him apart.
Phalanx ("spider")	Spider	Athena	In some versions, Phalanx is the brother of Arachne. The two siblings were favoured by Athena until they slept with each other, enraging the goddess. She turned them both into spiders.
Phineus	Mole	Helios	Multiple accounts of Phineus' tale exist; in one of them, Helios was enraged over an unspecified insult against him, and blinded the prophet, sending the Harpies to torment him. After the Argonauts killed the Harpies, Helios proceeded to turn Phineus into a blind creature, the mole.
Phoenice	Bear	Artemis	In a variation of Callisto's myth, Phoenice was a dear companion of Artemis who was seduced by Zeus and turned by Artemis into a bear. Later she became the constellation Ursa Minor.
Pompilus ("pilot fish")	Pilot fish	Apollo	Pompilus helped the nymph Ocyrhoe flee the ravenous advances of Apollo, who had fallen in love with her, by letting her board his ship and transferring her to the nearby island of Samos. But Apollo seized Ocyrhoe anyway, and as punishment, turned Pompilus into a pilot fish.
Several people	Various animals	Circe	They were transformed into various animals in Aeaea by the sorceress-goddess Circe, including Odysseus' crewmen, who were transformed into pigs. Although Odysseus freed his own crewmen, the other people-turned-animals in Circe's island were not as lucky and were not ever changed back. Odysseus' crew: Polites, Elpenor
Taygete	Doe	Artemis	Taygete, a Pleiad, was being pursued by the god Zeus, whom she did not desire to mate with. Artemis, feeling sorry for the nymph, allowed her to escape Zeus's advances by turning her into a doe.
Themisto	Bear	Hera	Doublet of both Callisto and Megisto; mother of Arcas by Zeus who was transformed into a bear by Hera in punishment.
Theophane	Sheep	Poseidon	Theophane was a beautiful maiden whom Poseidon took away from all the other potential suitors and rivals in love. He transformed her into a sheep, and himself into a ram, and together they became the parents of the golden-haired ram who carried Phrixus to Colchis and whose fleece Jason was sent to take.
Theophane's suitors	Wolves	Poseidon	After Poseidon took Theophane for his own, her ardent suitors followed them, so Poseidon changed himself and Theophane into sheep, and the inhabitants of Crinissa into animals. The suitors began to slaughter the animals, so Poseidon turned them into wolves.
Tiresias	Mouse	Aphrodite	In one version of the prophet Tiresias's sex-change story which includes a cycle of seven transformations alternating between male and female, in the end Aphrodite, who finally changes him into a woman, gets annoyed at Tiresias over some insult and transforms them into a mouse.
Titanis	Doe	Artemis	One of the goddess Artemis's mortal followers, Titanis was expelled from the group and changed by Artemis into a doe for her beauty.
Tithonus	Cicada	Eos	When Eos wished for her mortal lover Tithonus to become immortal, her wish was granted, but she forgot to wish for eternal youth as well. As a result, Tithonus kept aging, but never dying, until he became a shrivelled, helpless old man. In the end, Eos transformed him into a cicada.
Tyrrhenian pirates	Dolphins	Dionysus	Dionysus was once captured by pirates, who meant to debauch him and sell him into slavery. He himself turned into a lion, and let a savage bear loose on the ship. Some of the pirates jumped into the sea to save themselves, and were turned into dolphins. (Their names Aethalides, Alcimedon, Dictys, Epopeus, Libys, Lycabas, Melas, Medon, Opheltes, Simon.)

=== Metamorphoses into birds ===
Metamorphoses into birds
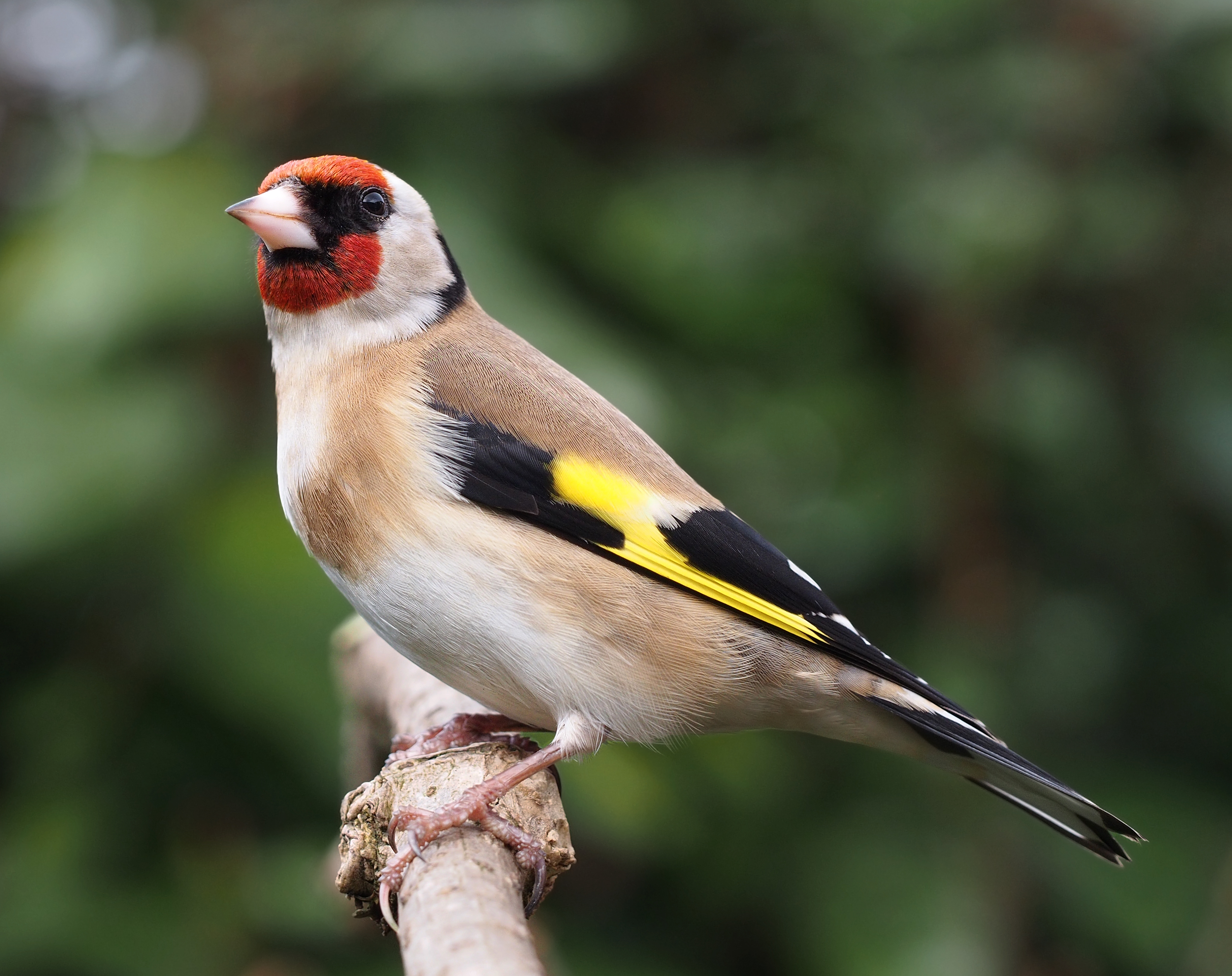
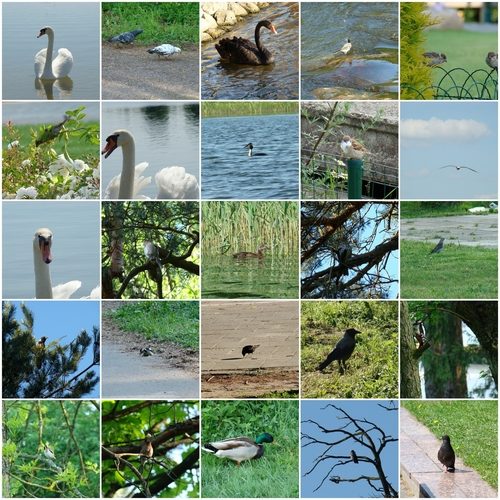
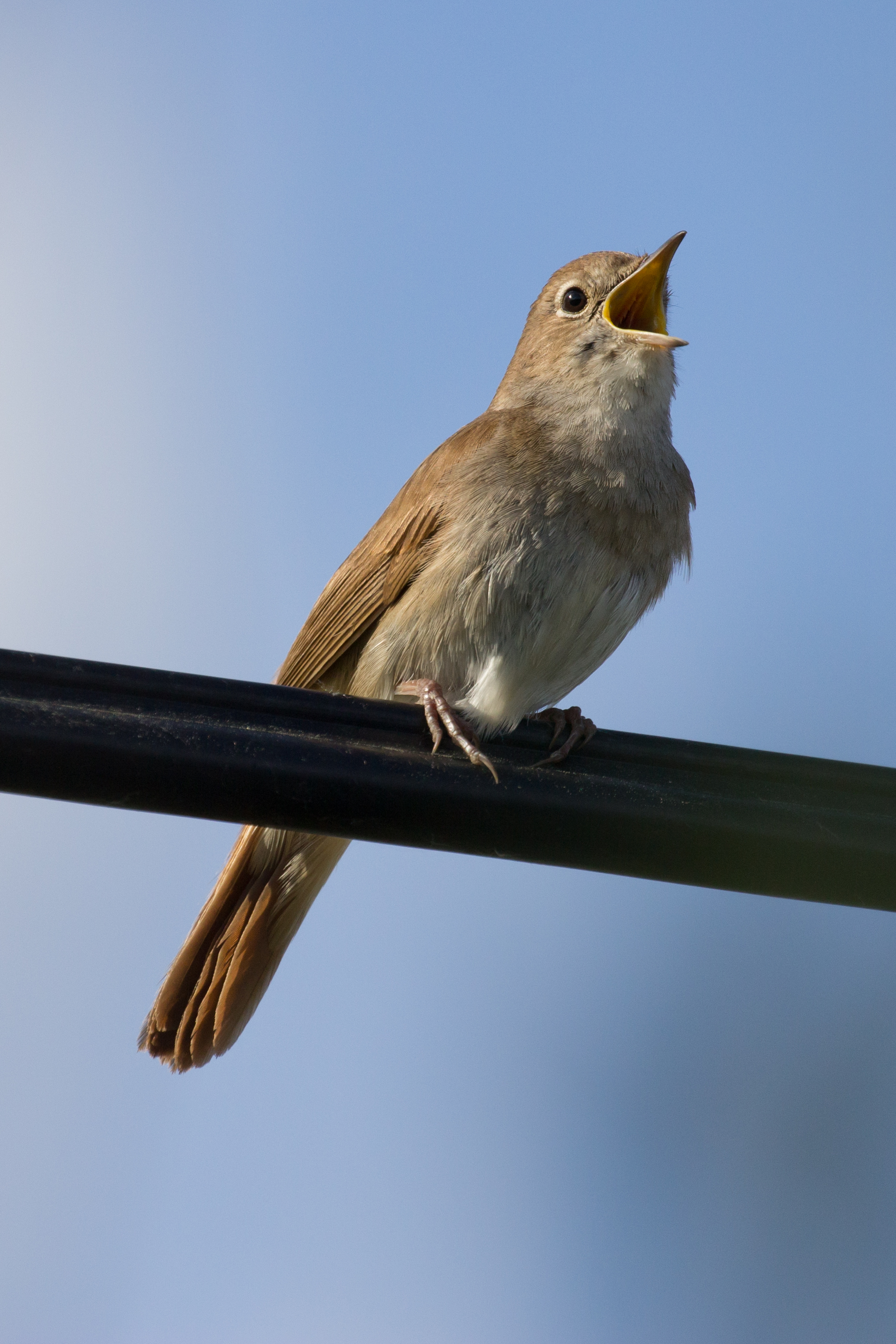
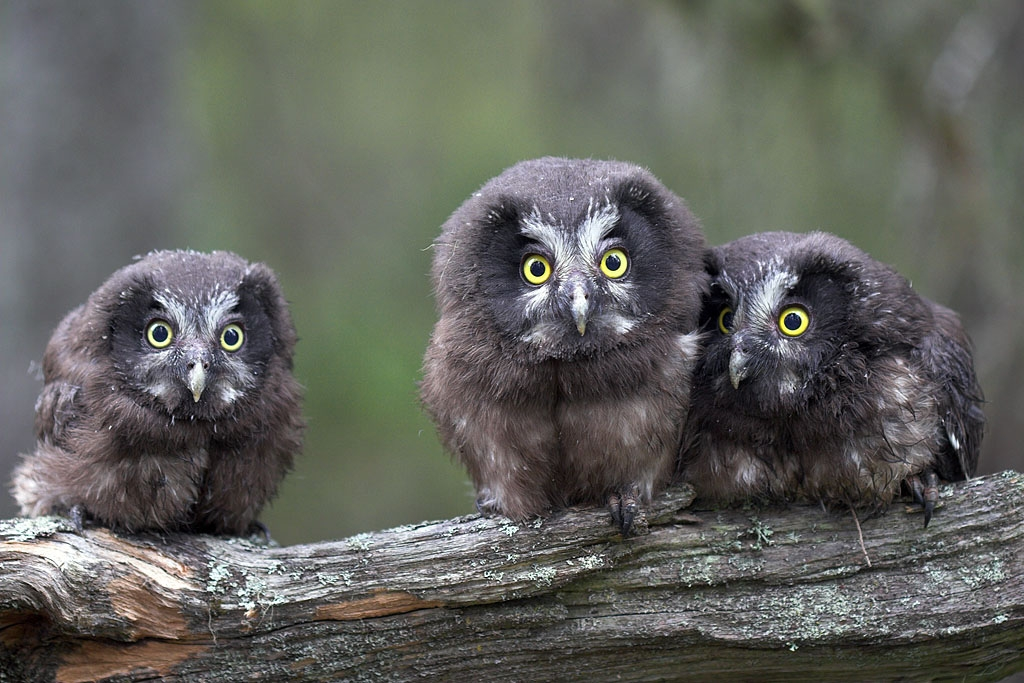
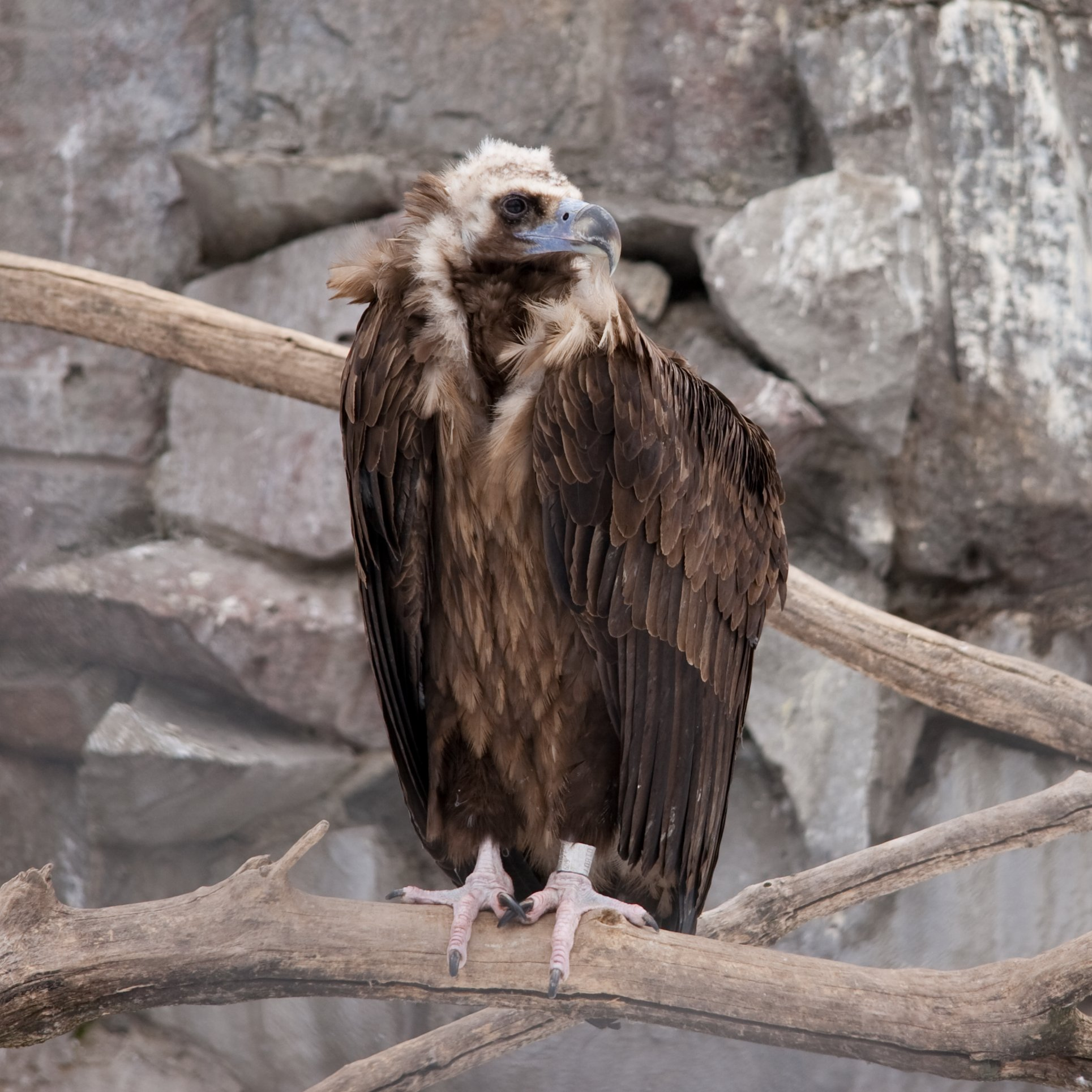
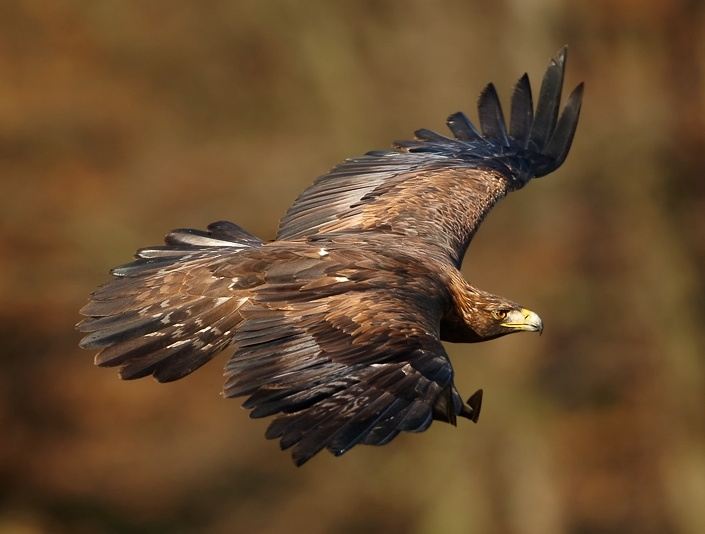
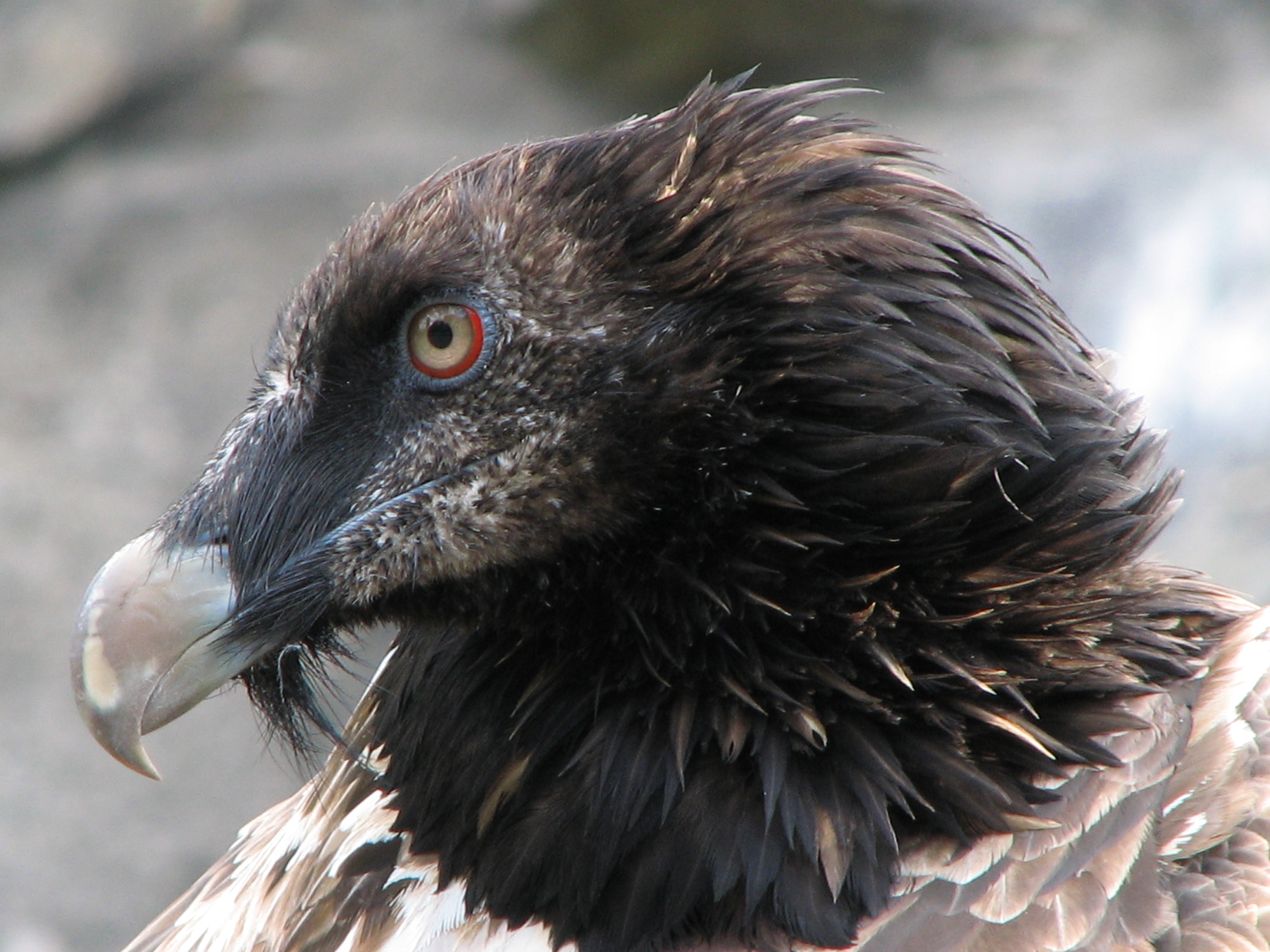
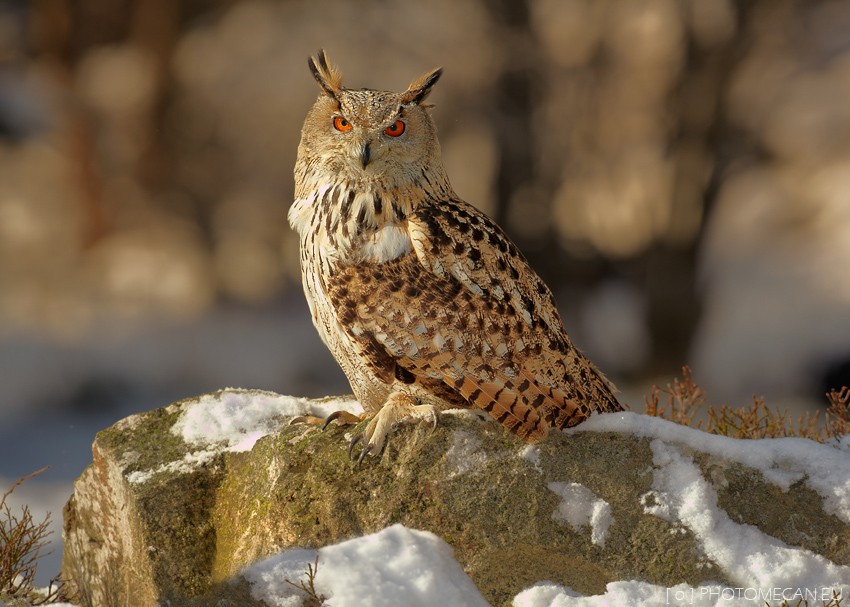
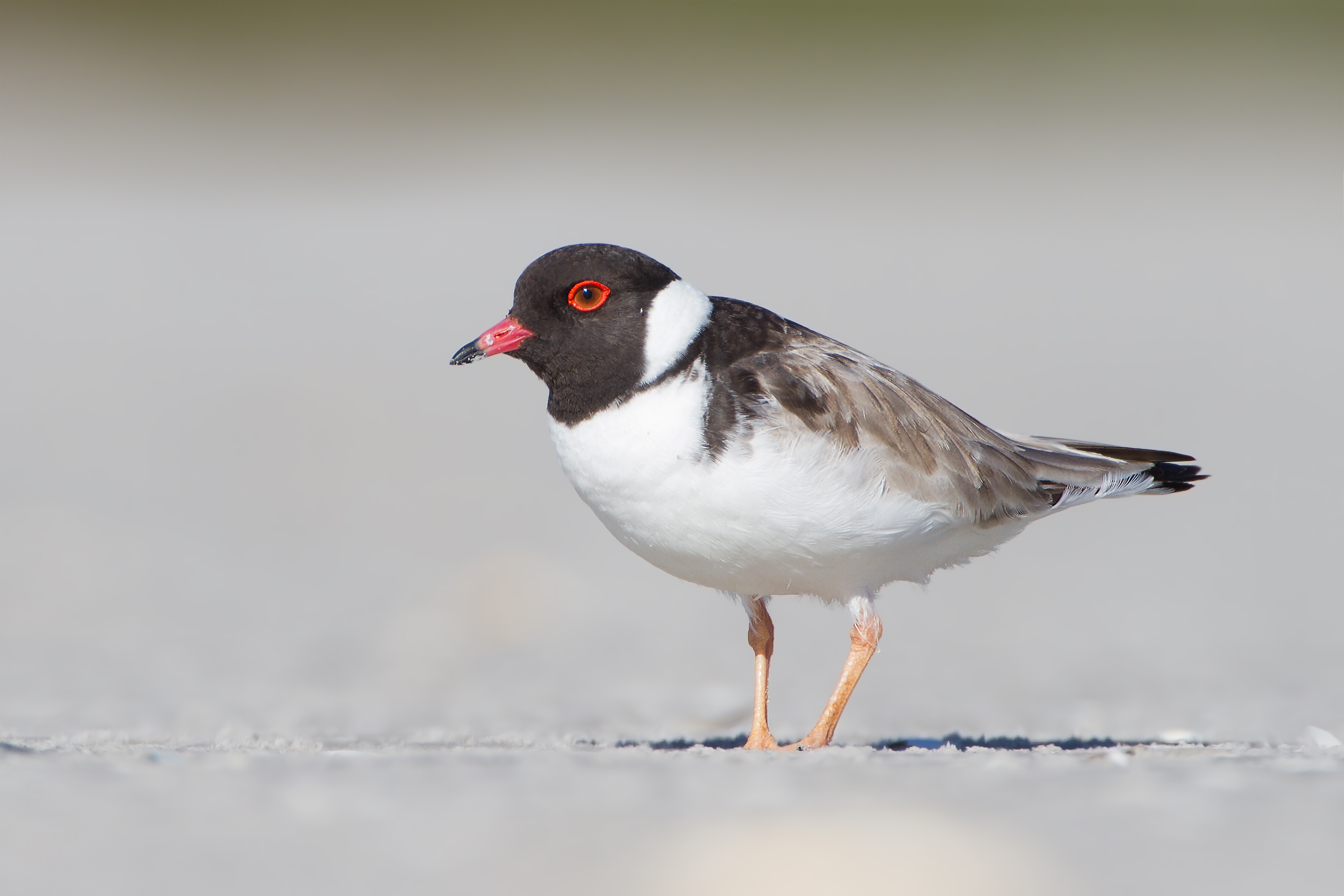
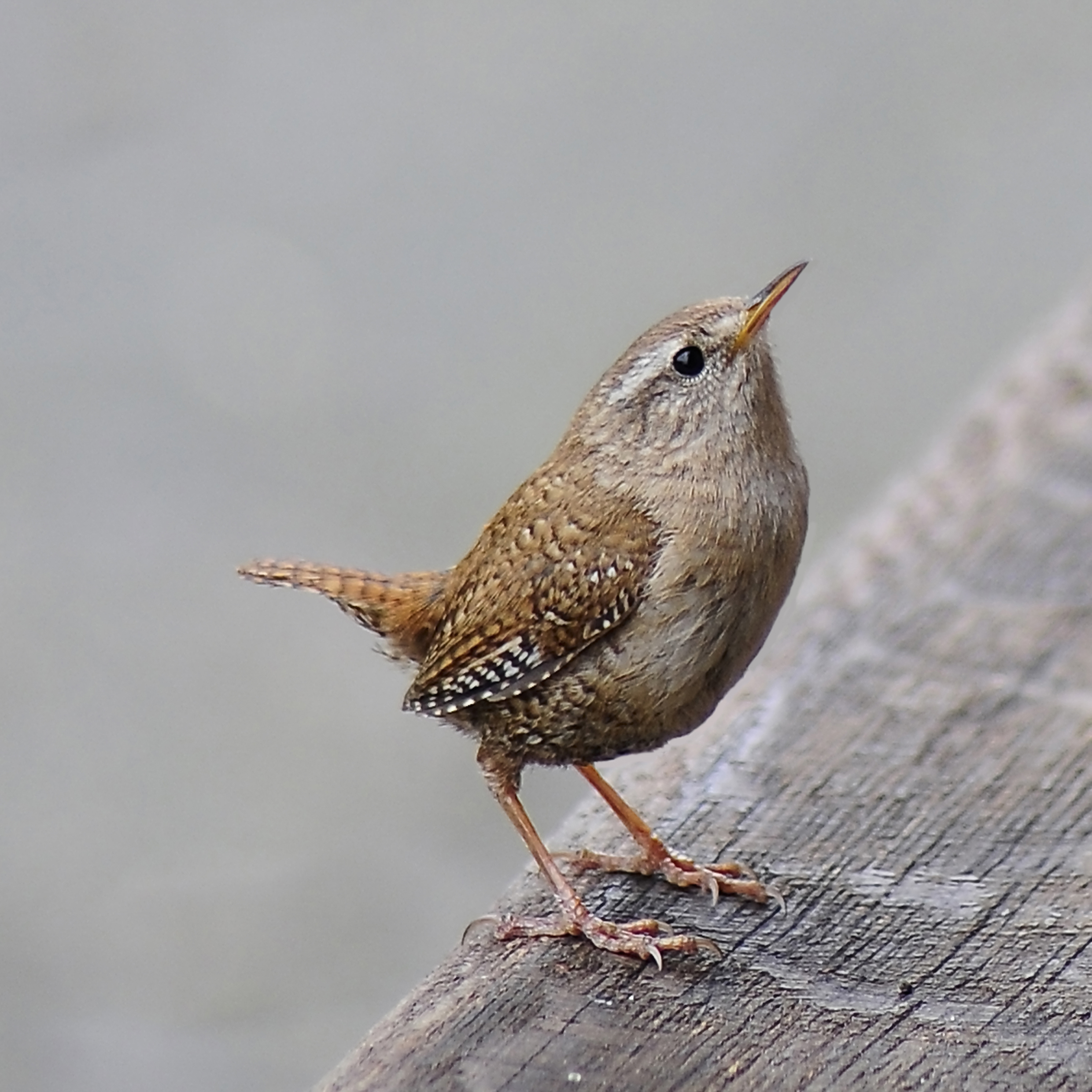
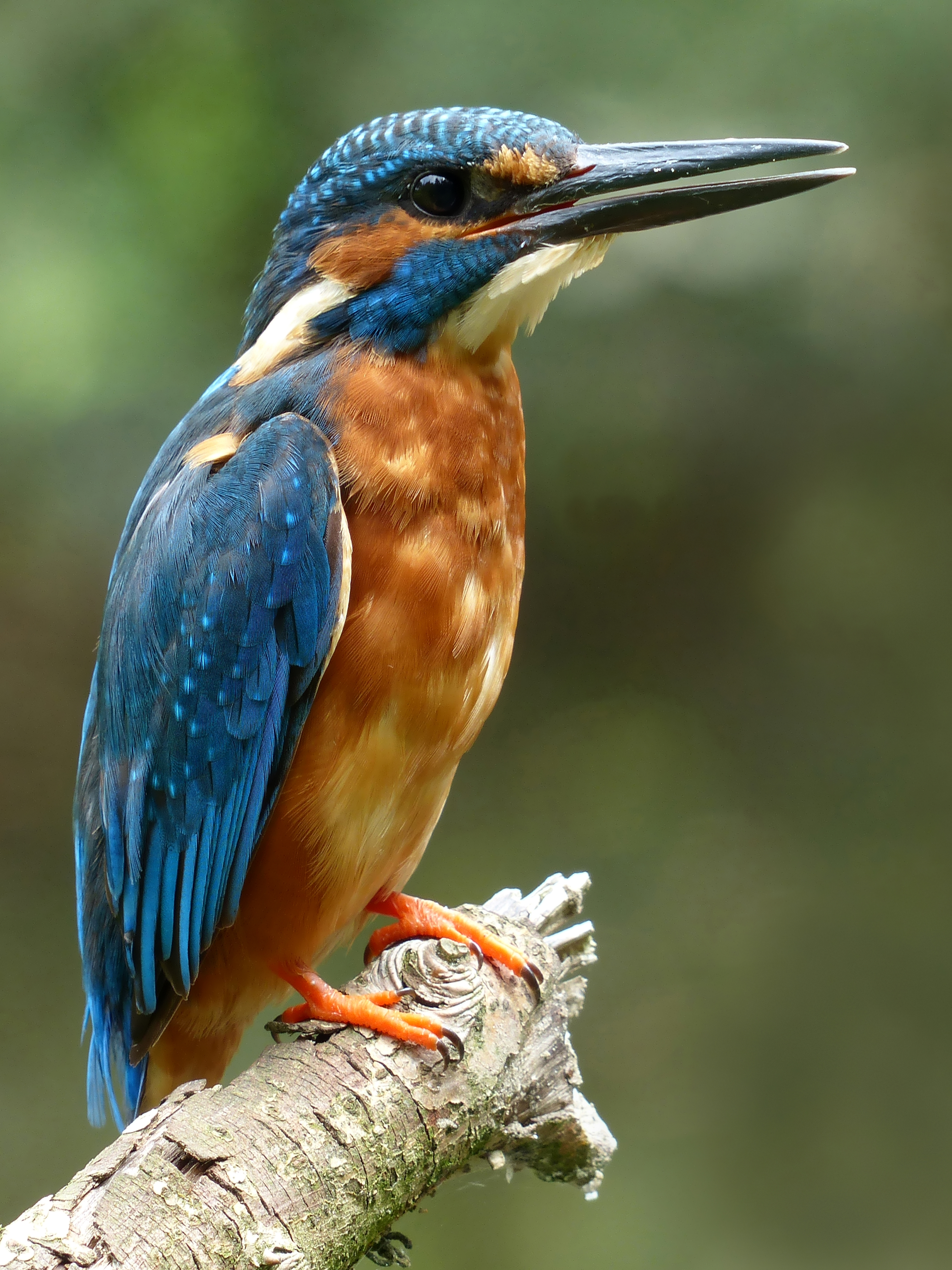
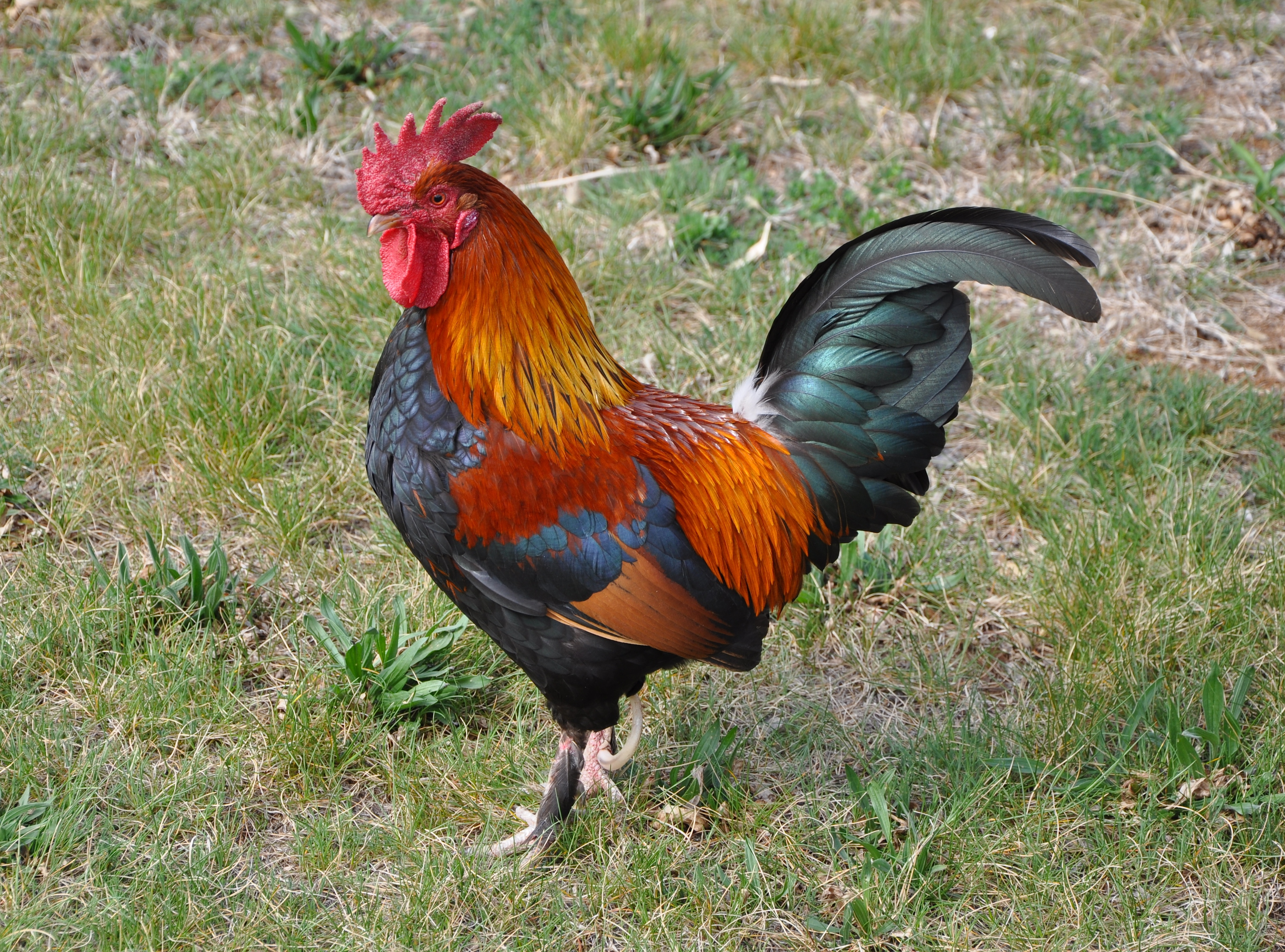
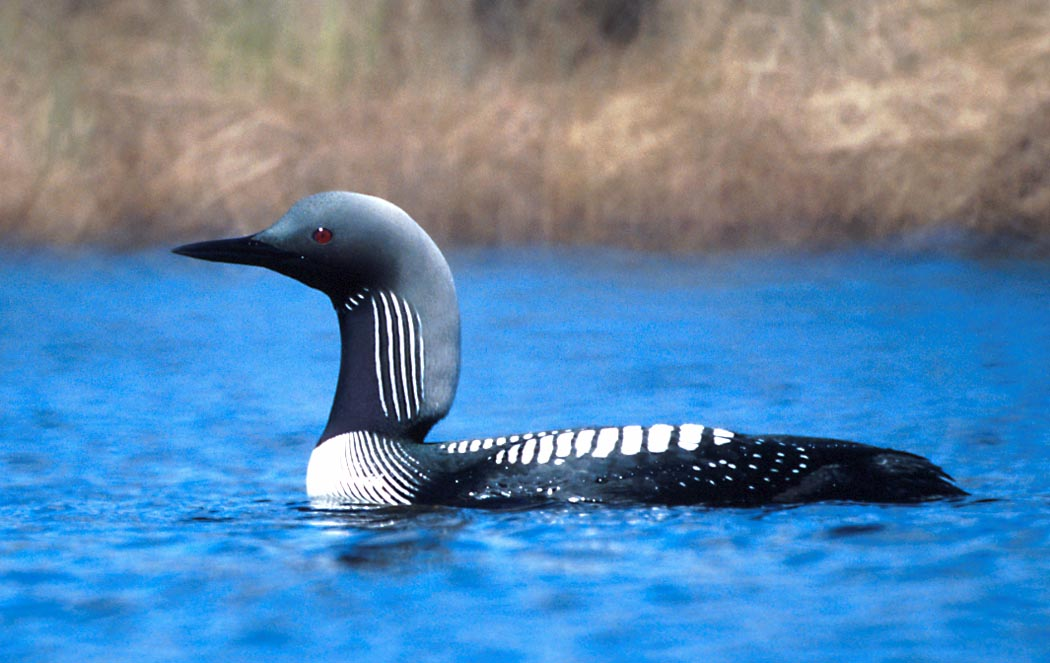
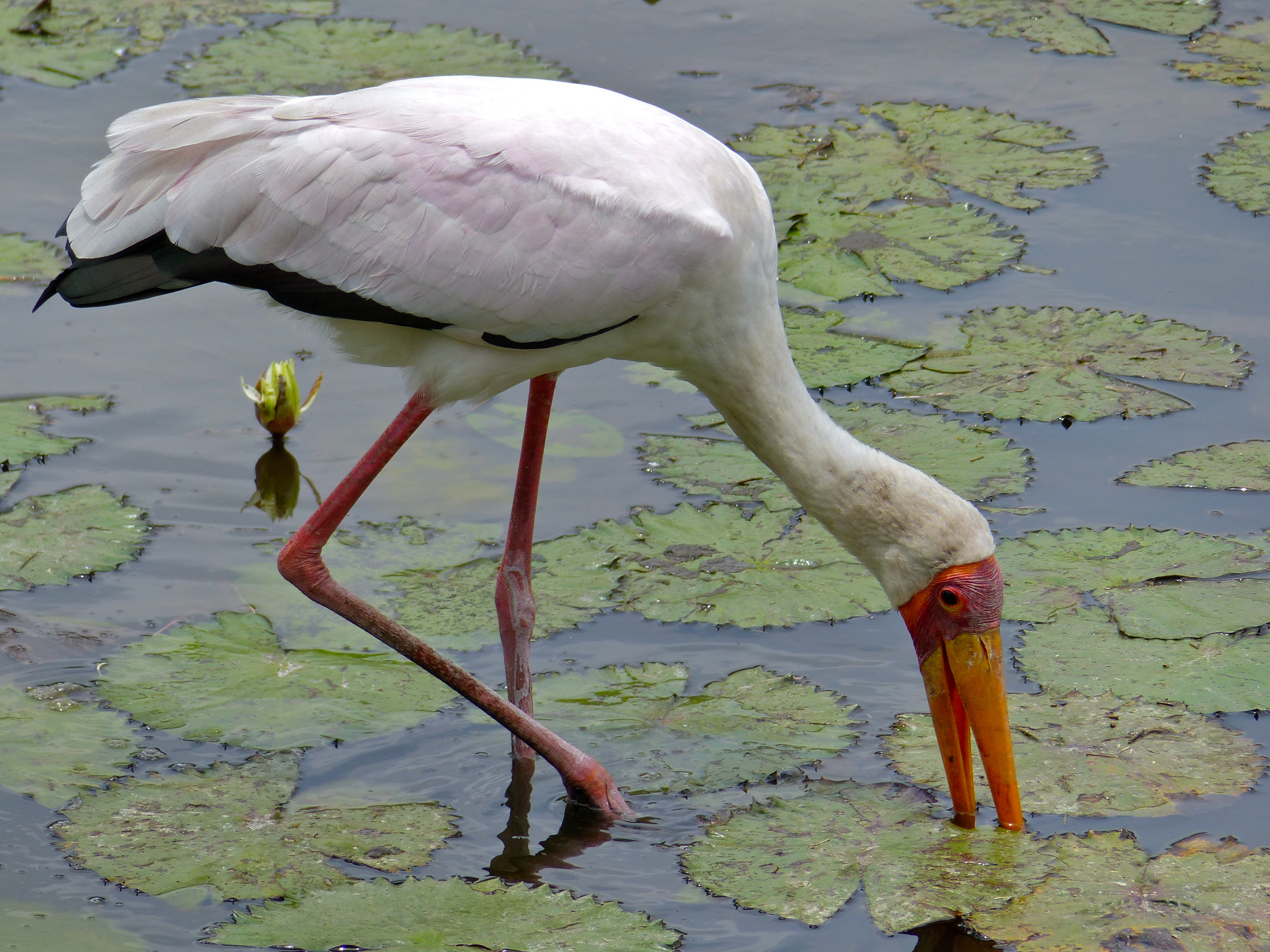
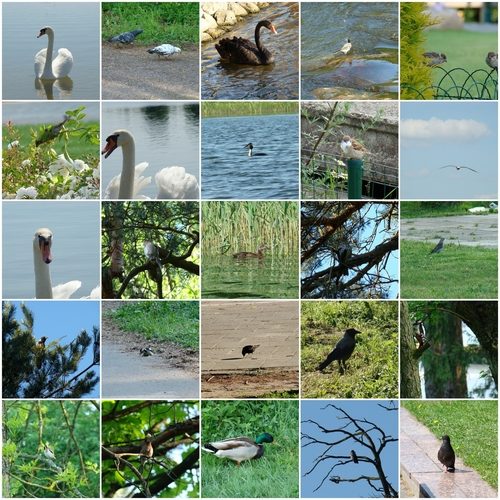
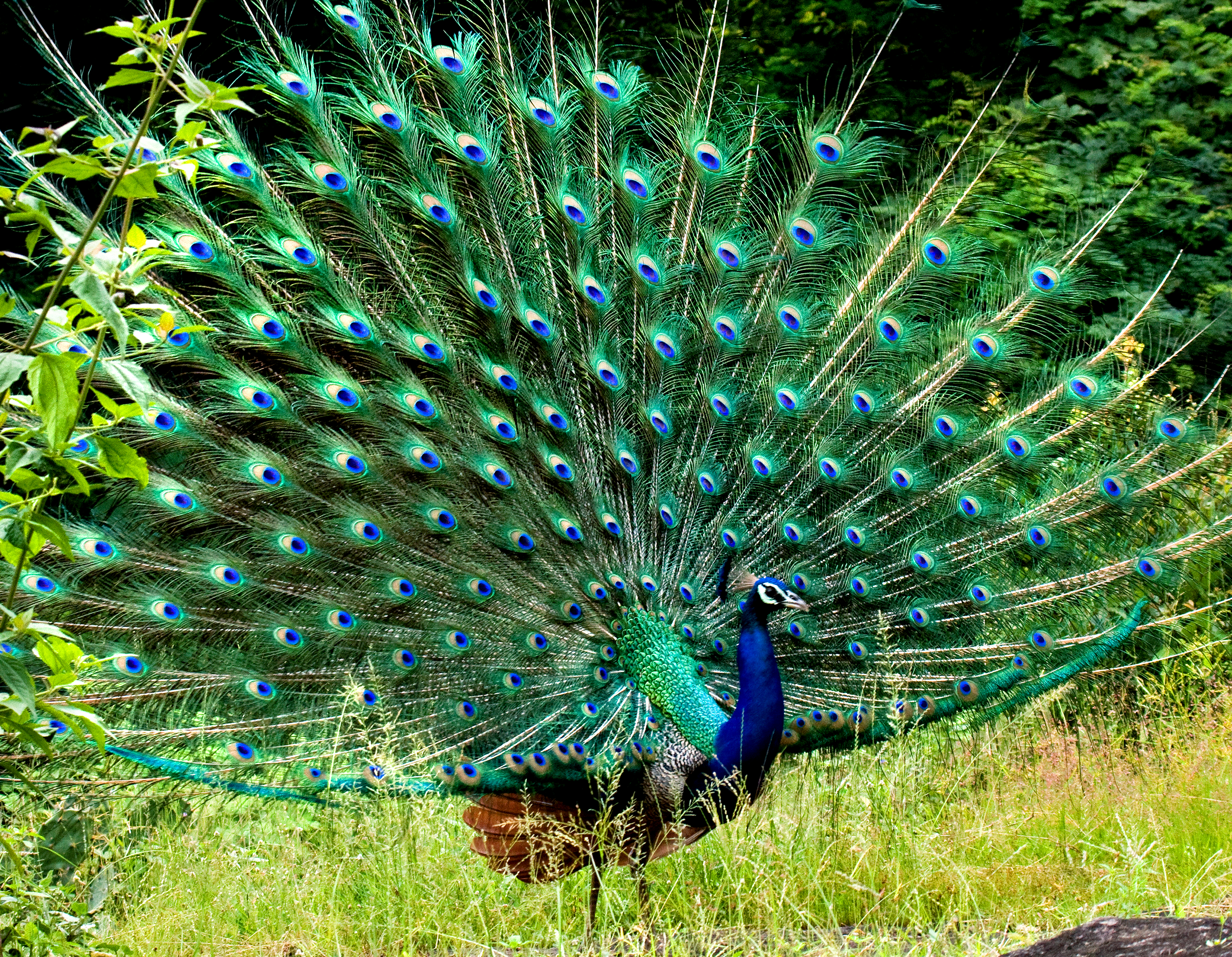
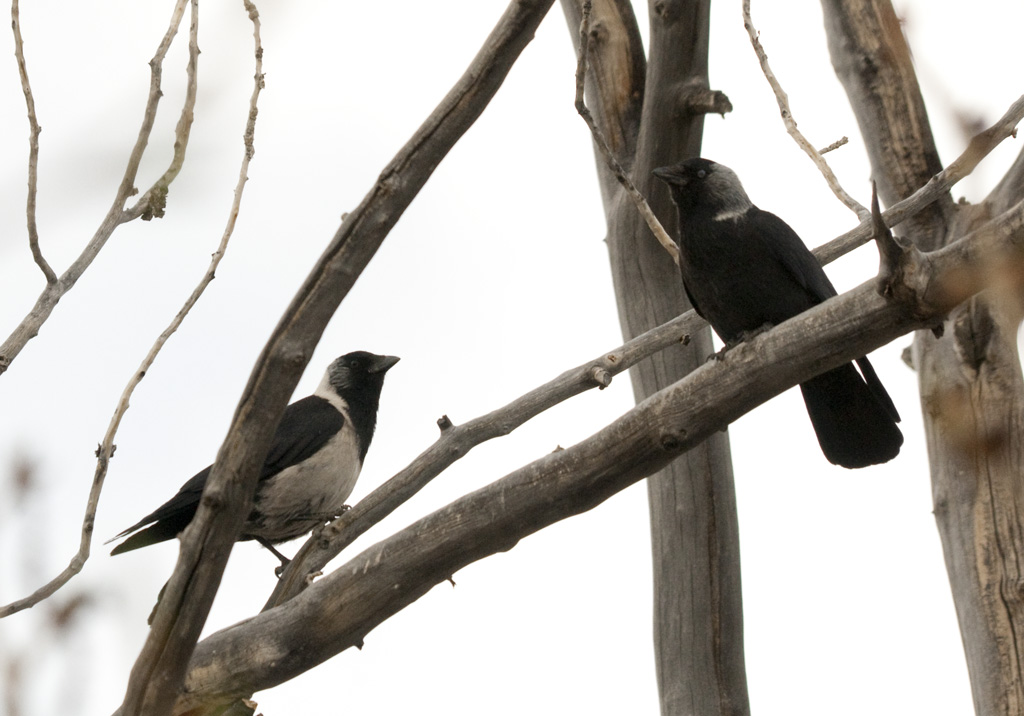
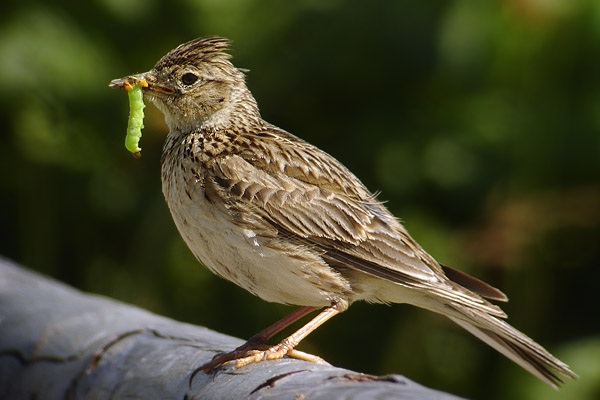
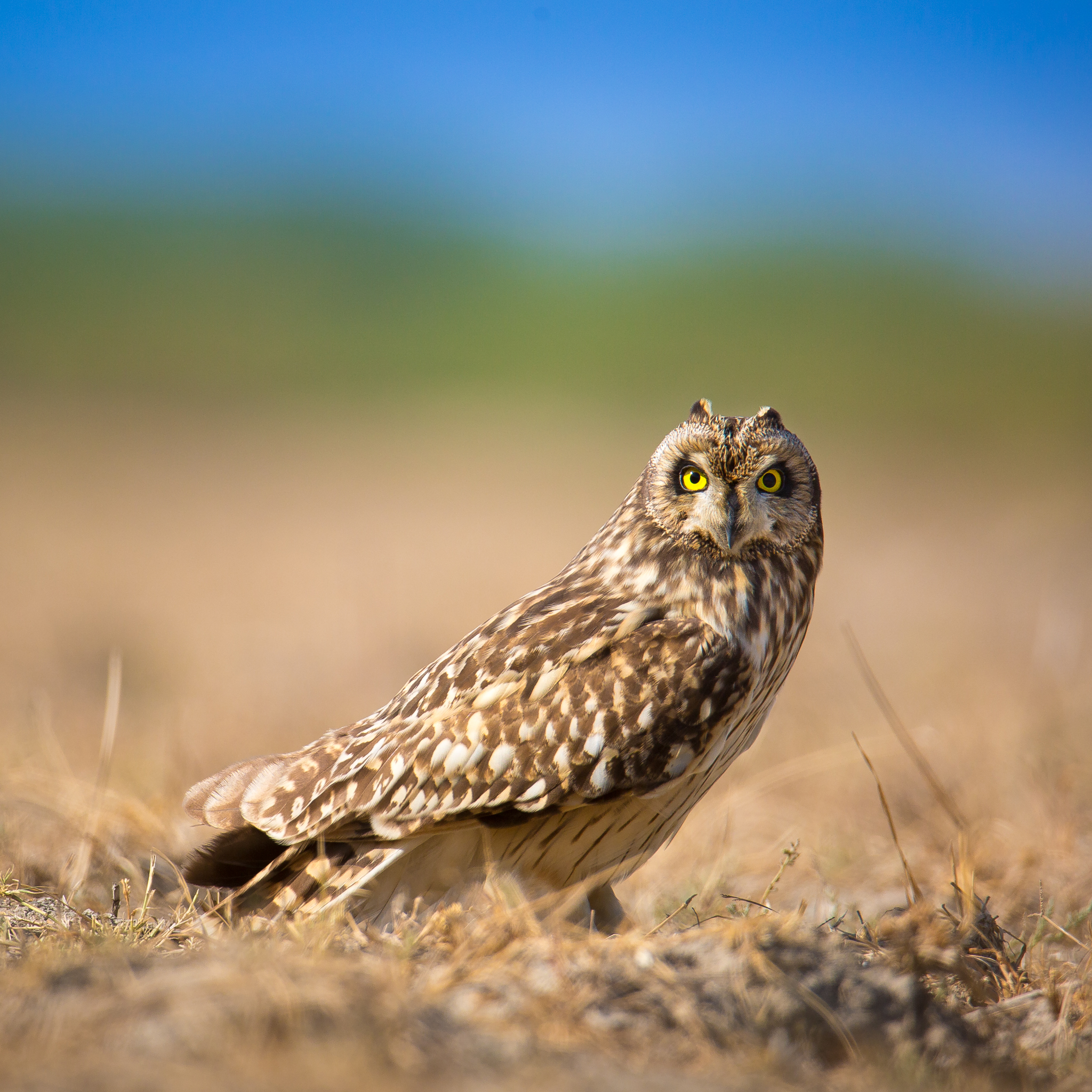
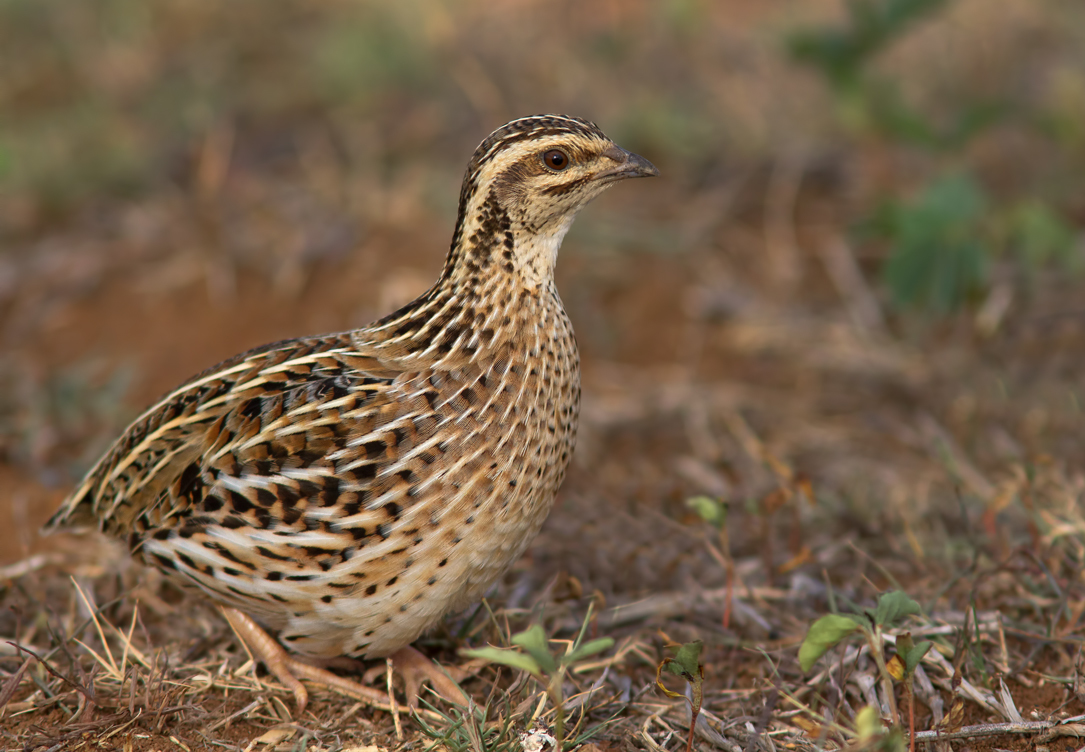
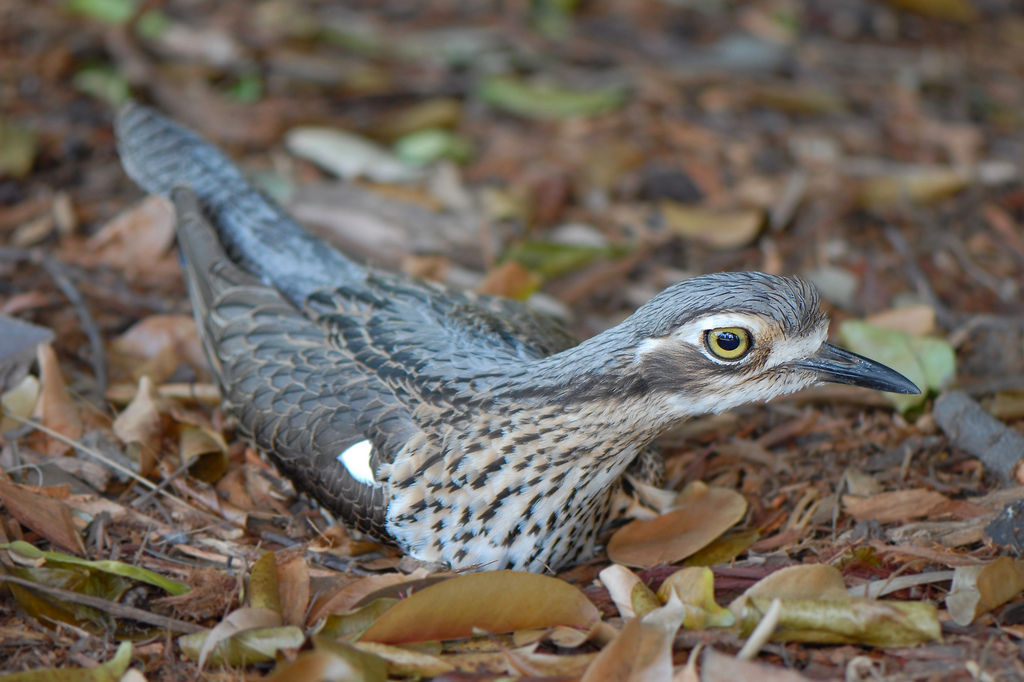
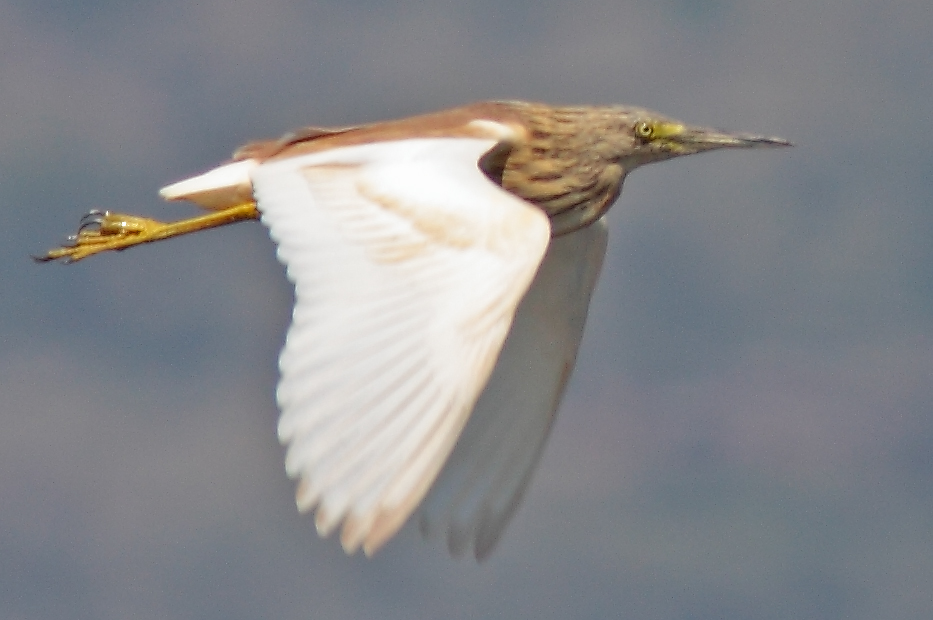
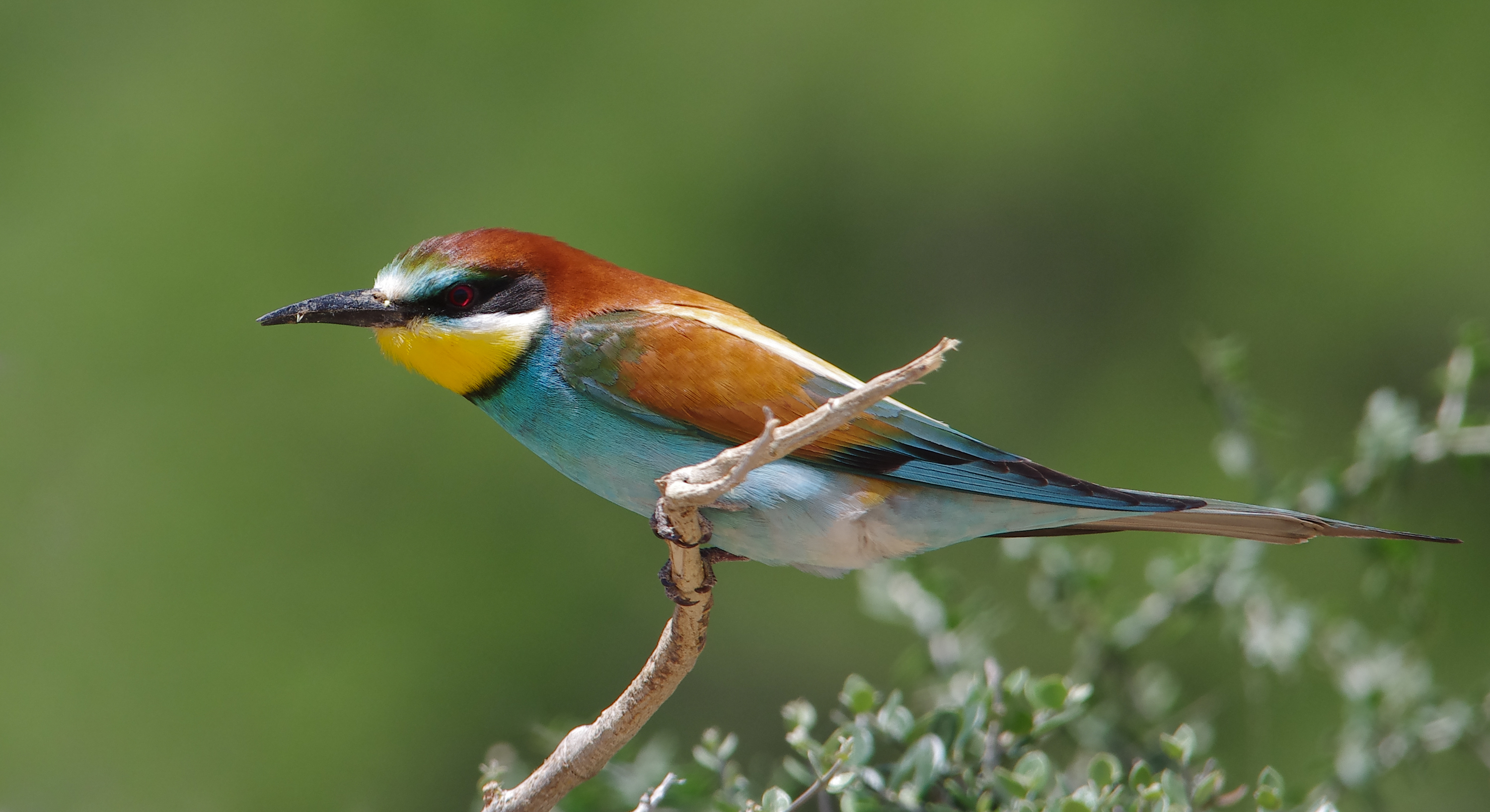
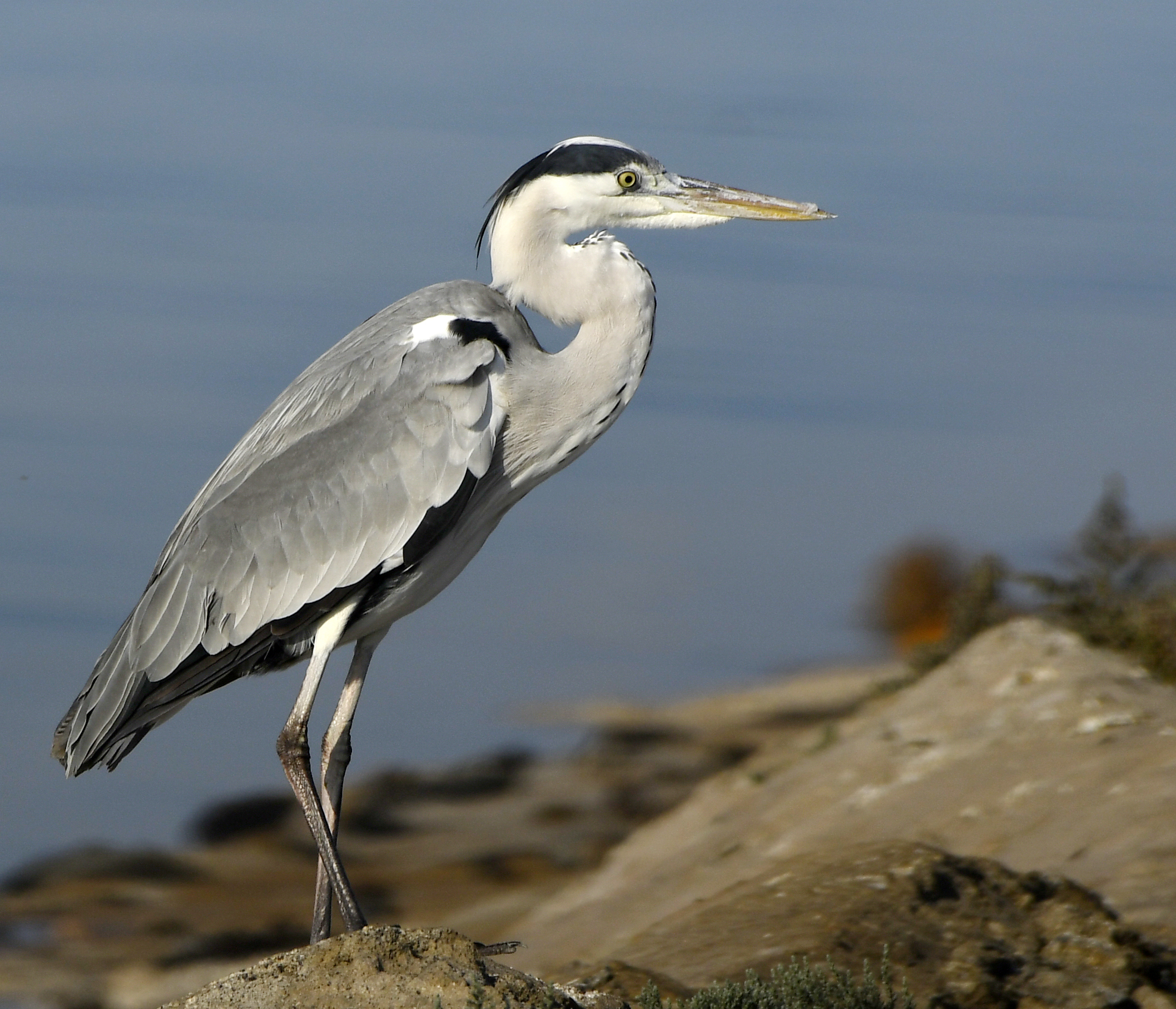
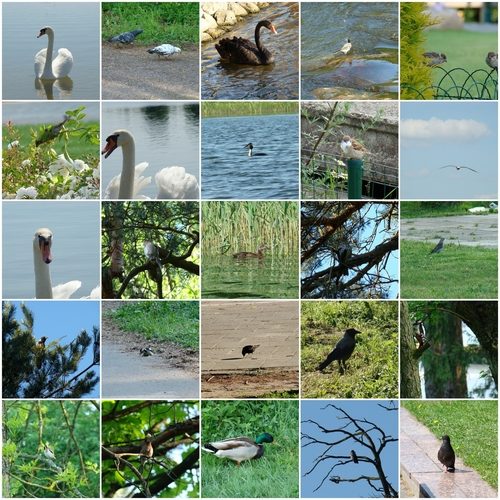
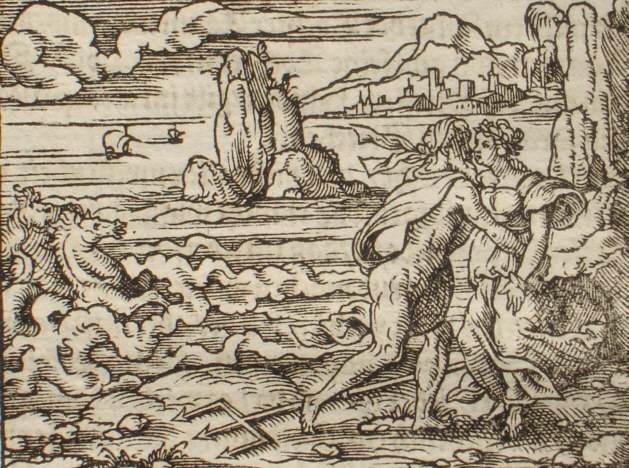
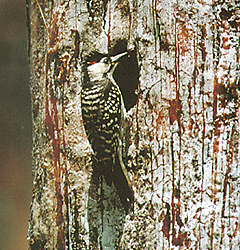
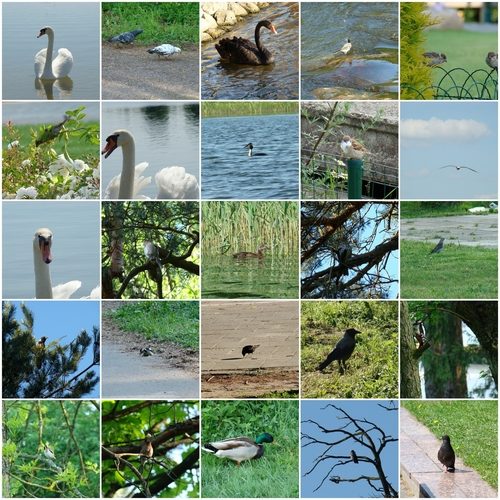
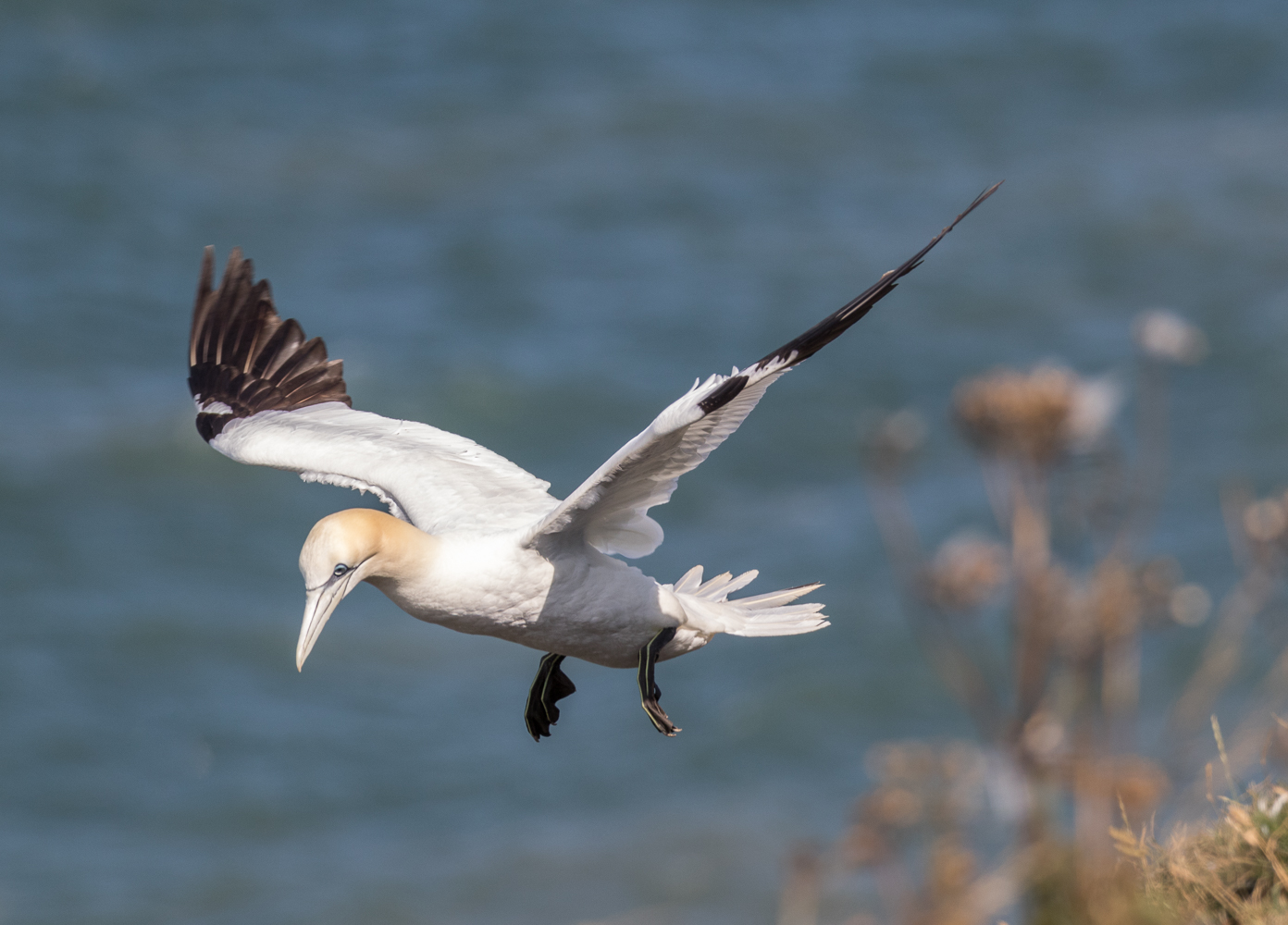
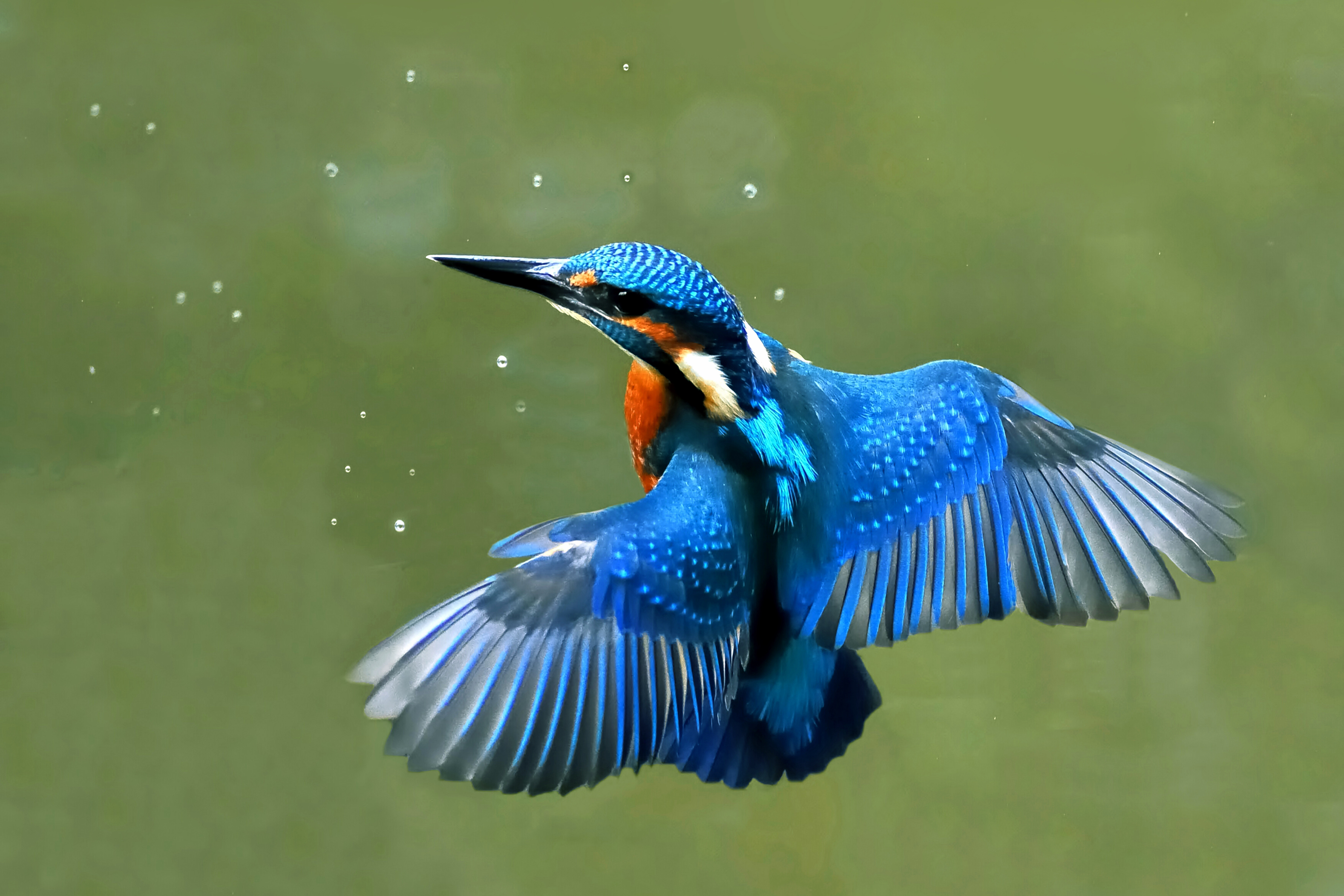
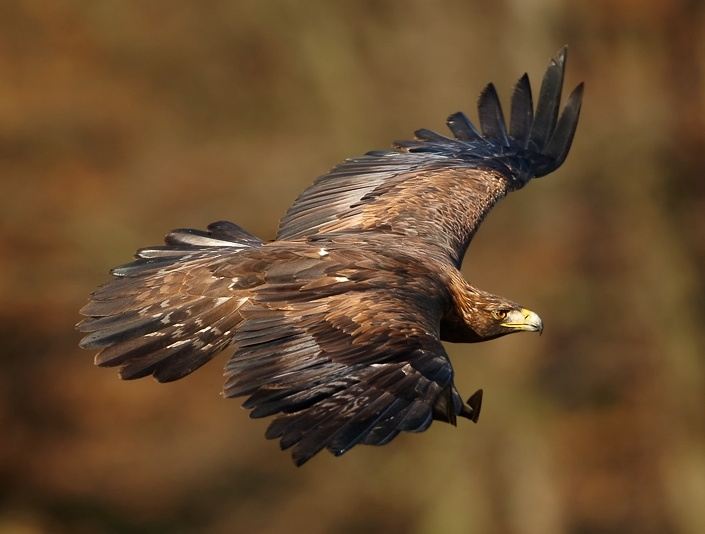
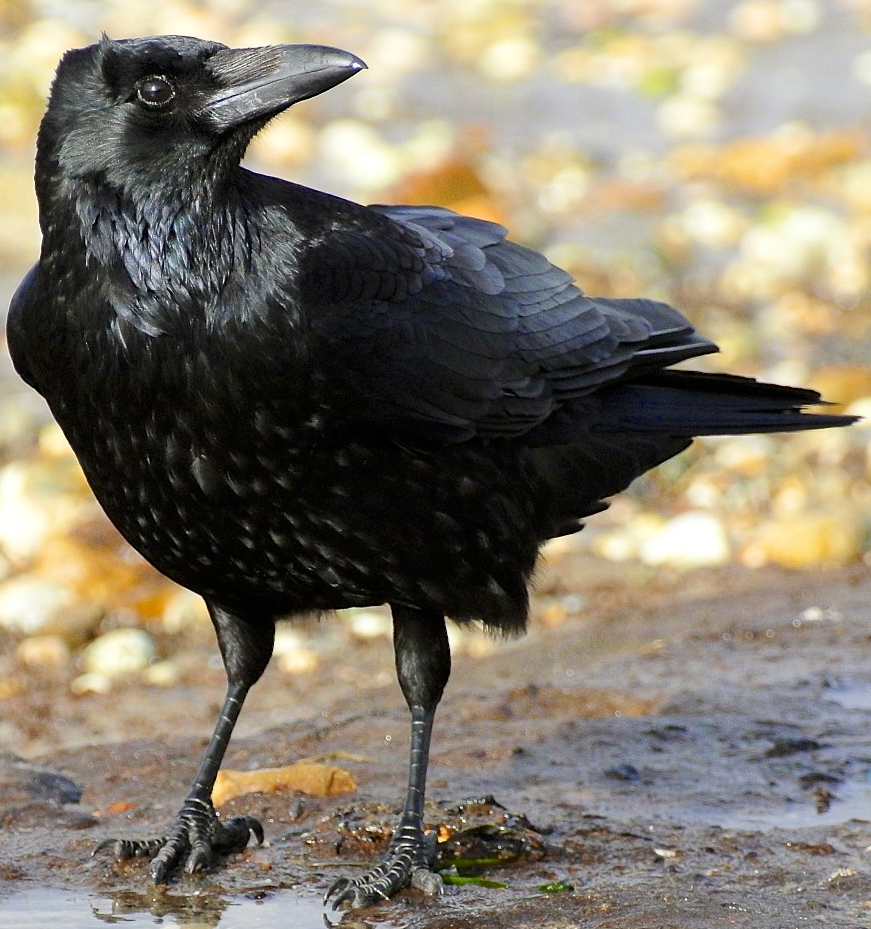
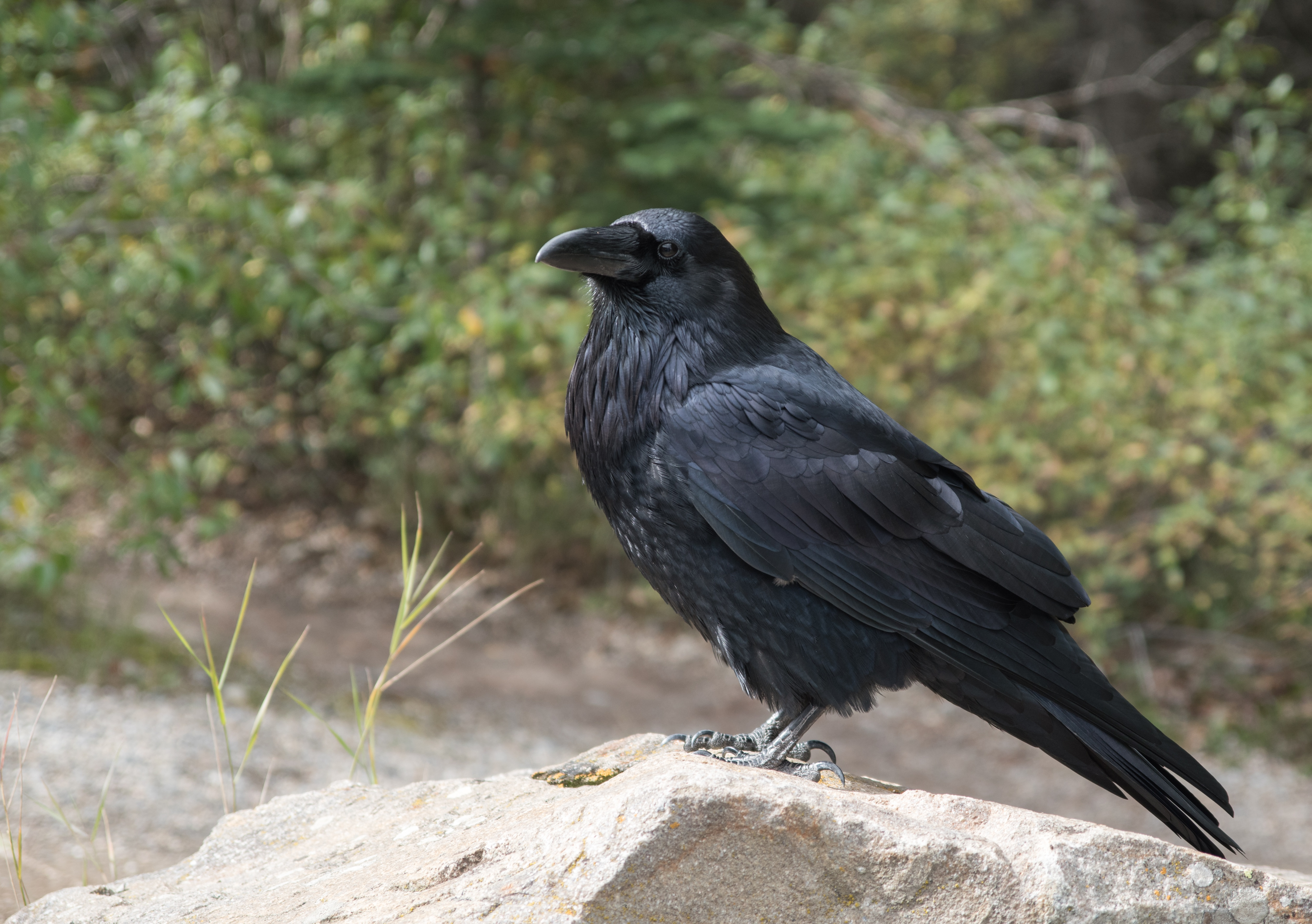
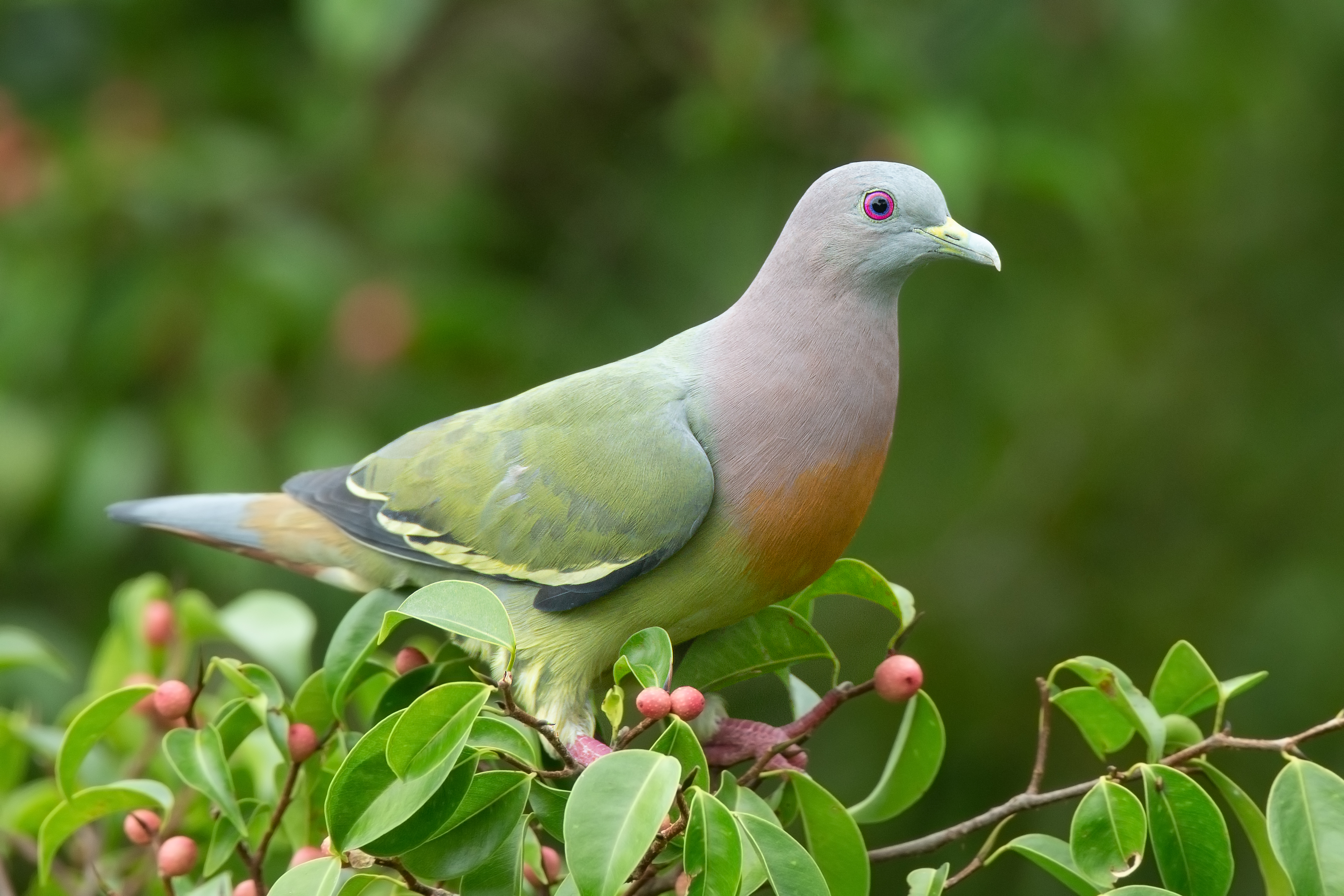
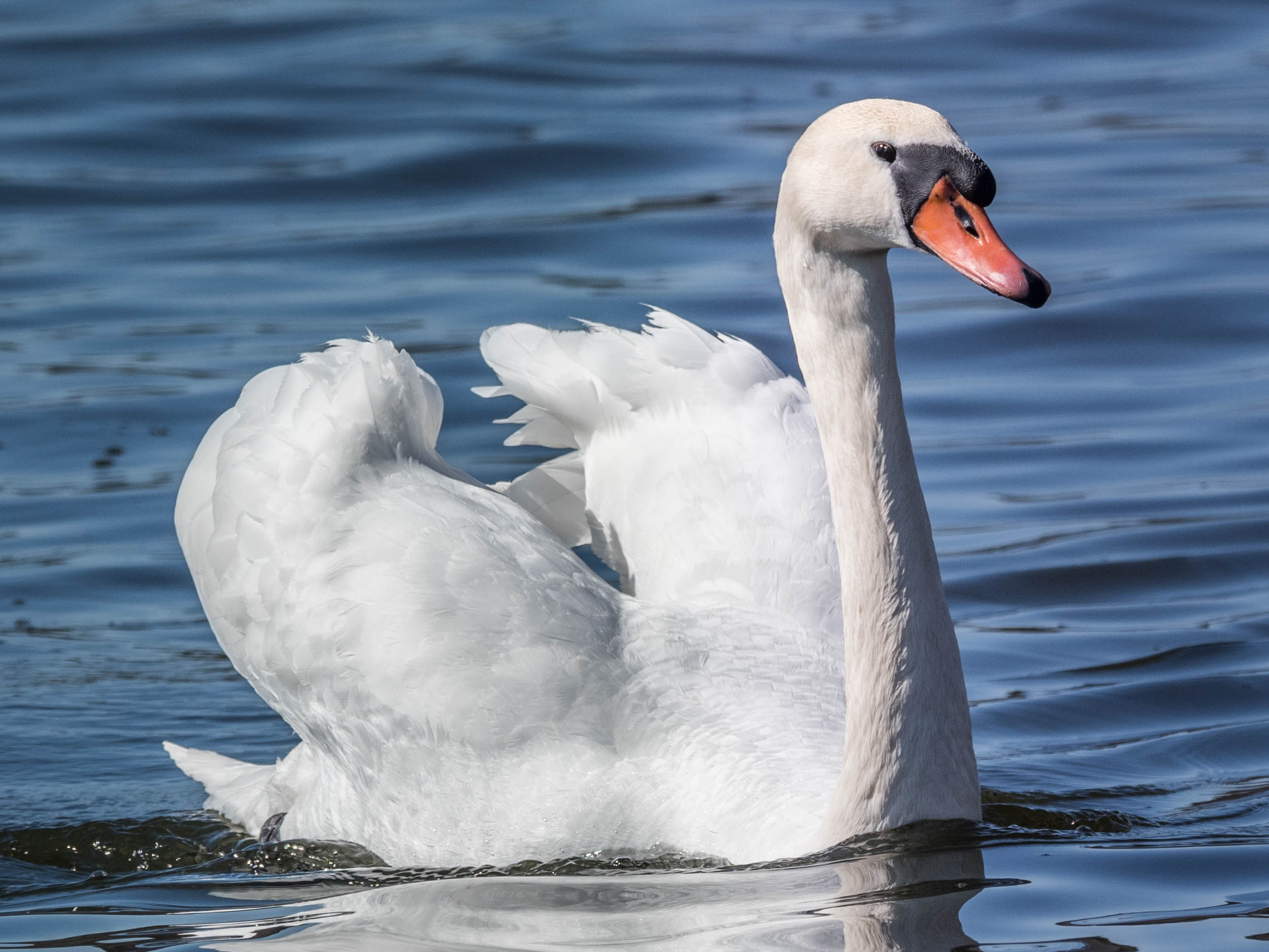
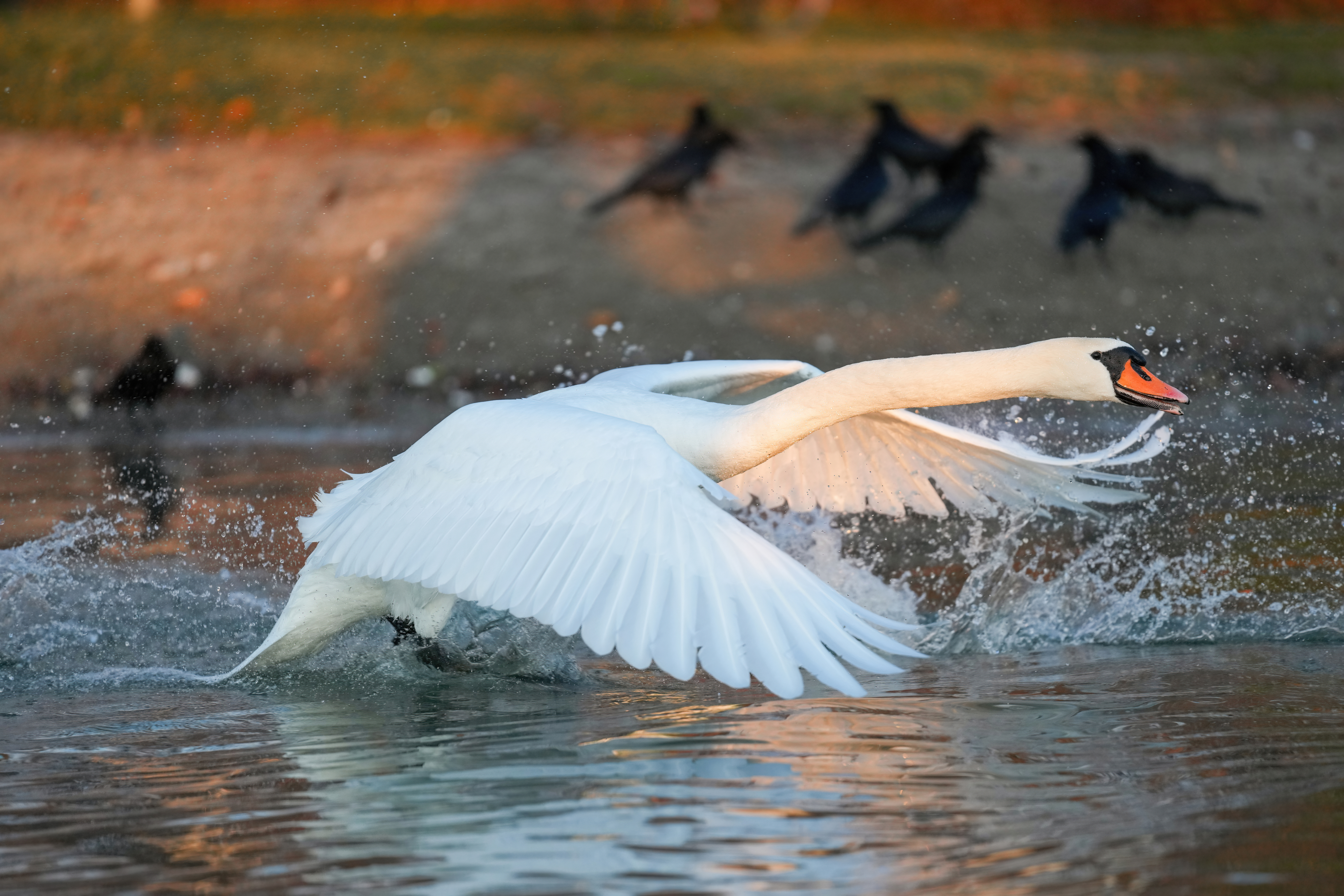
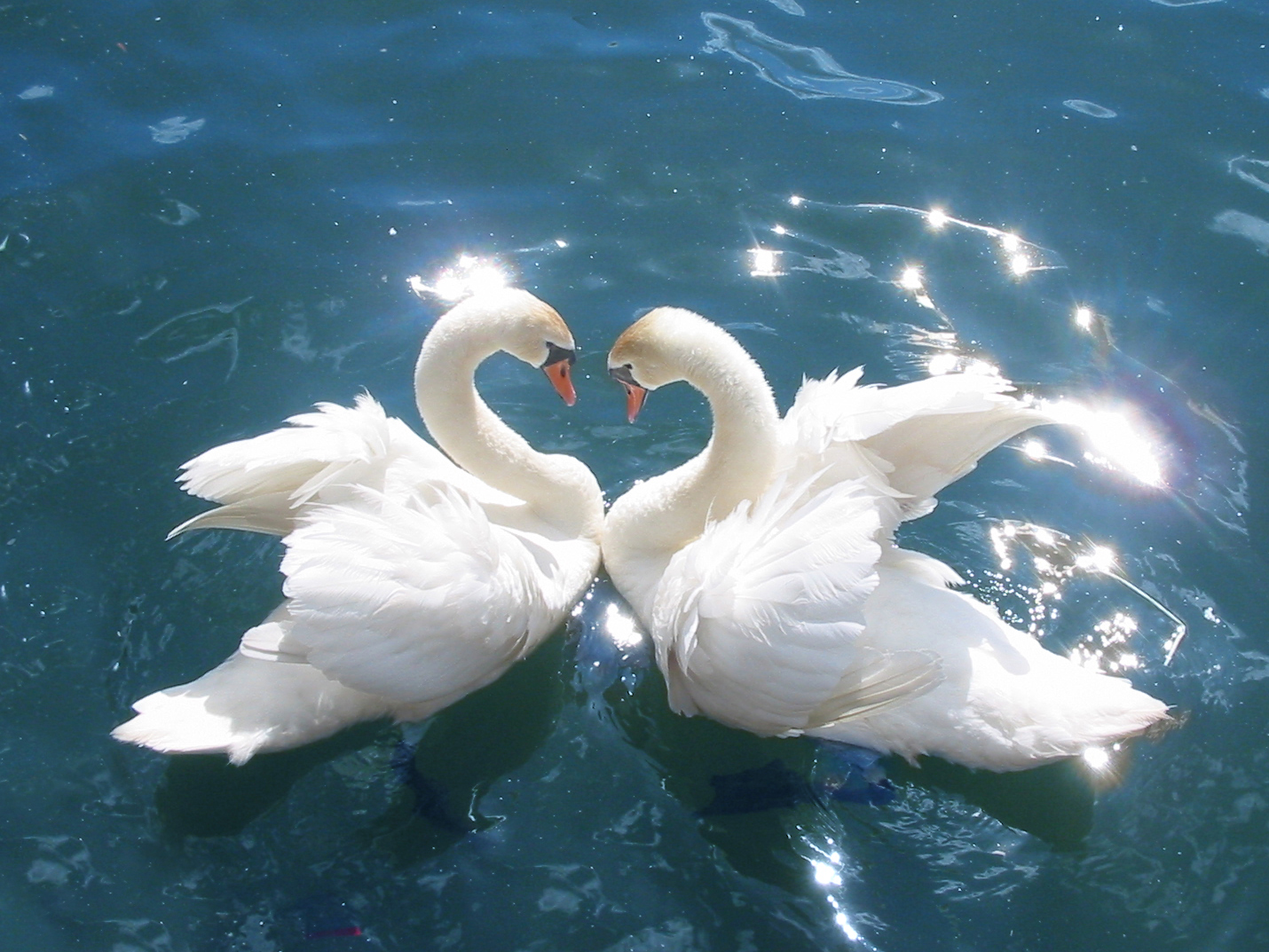
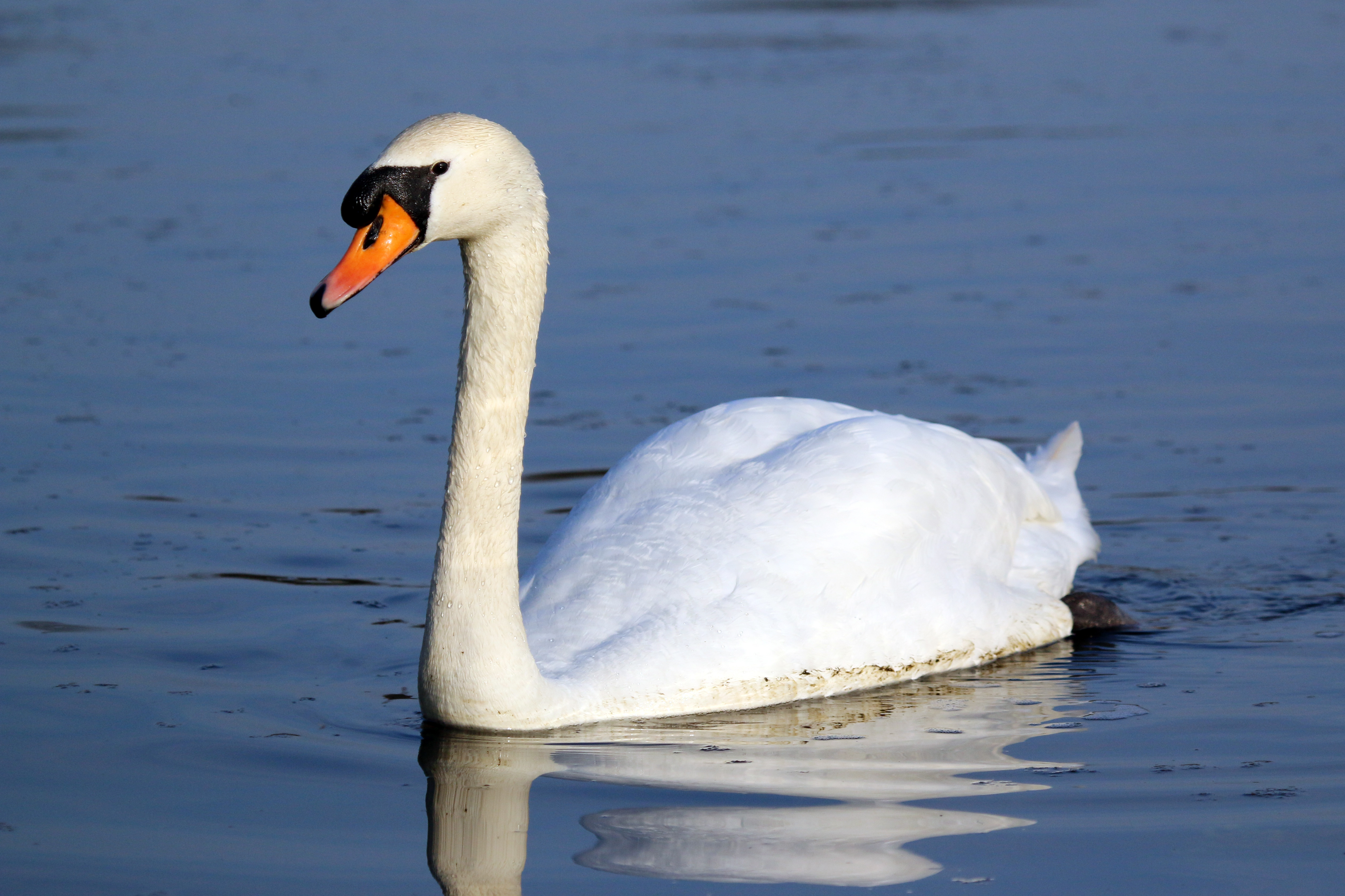
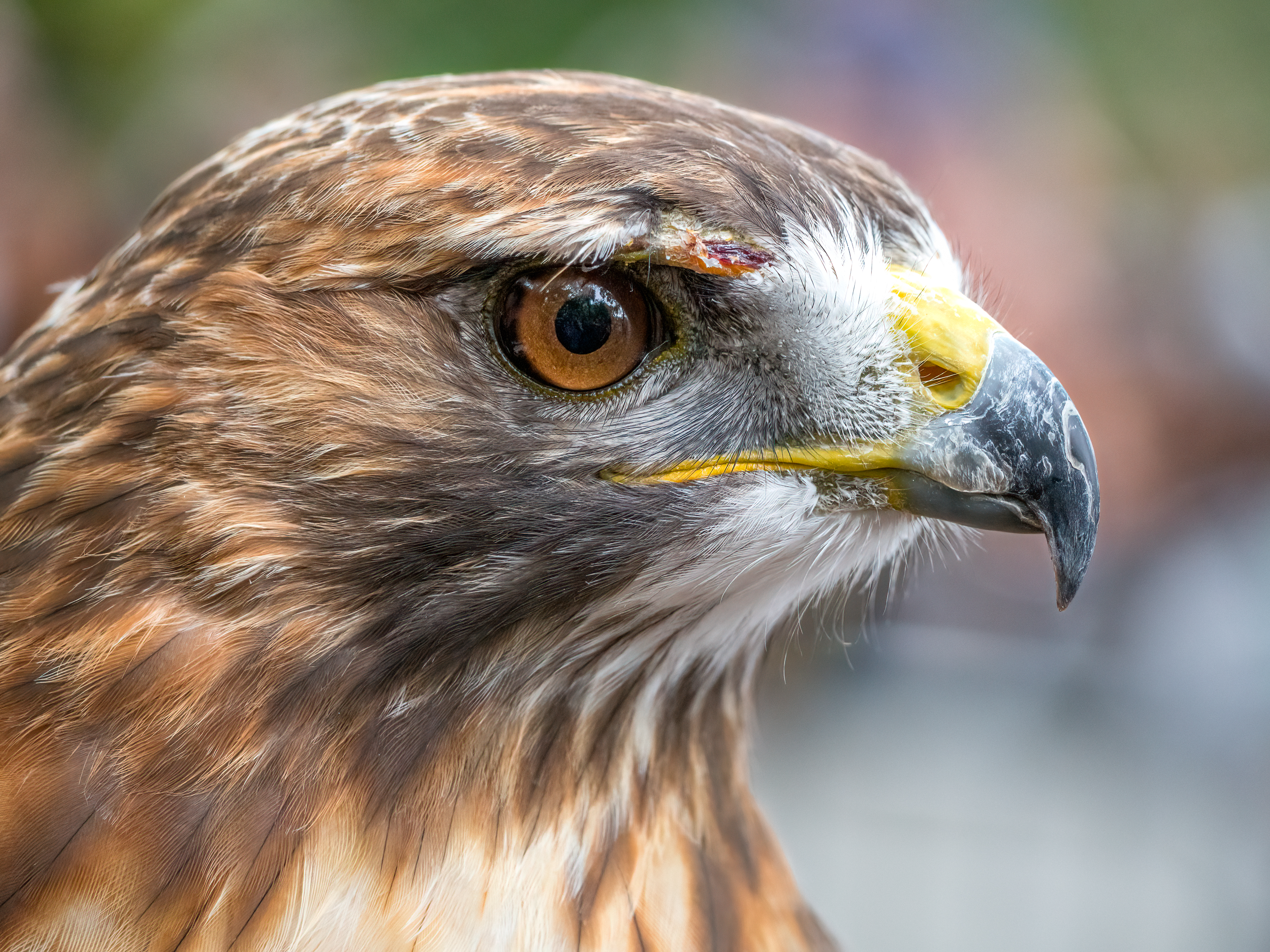
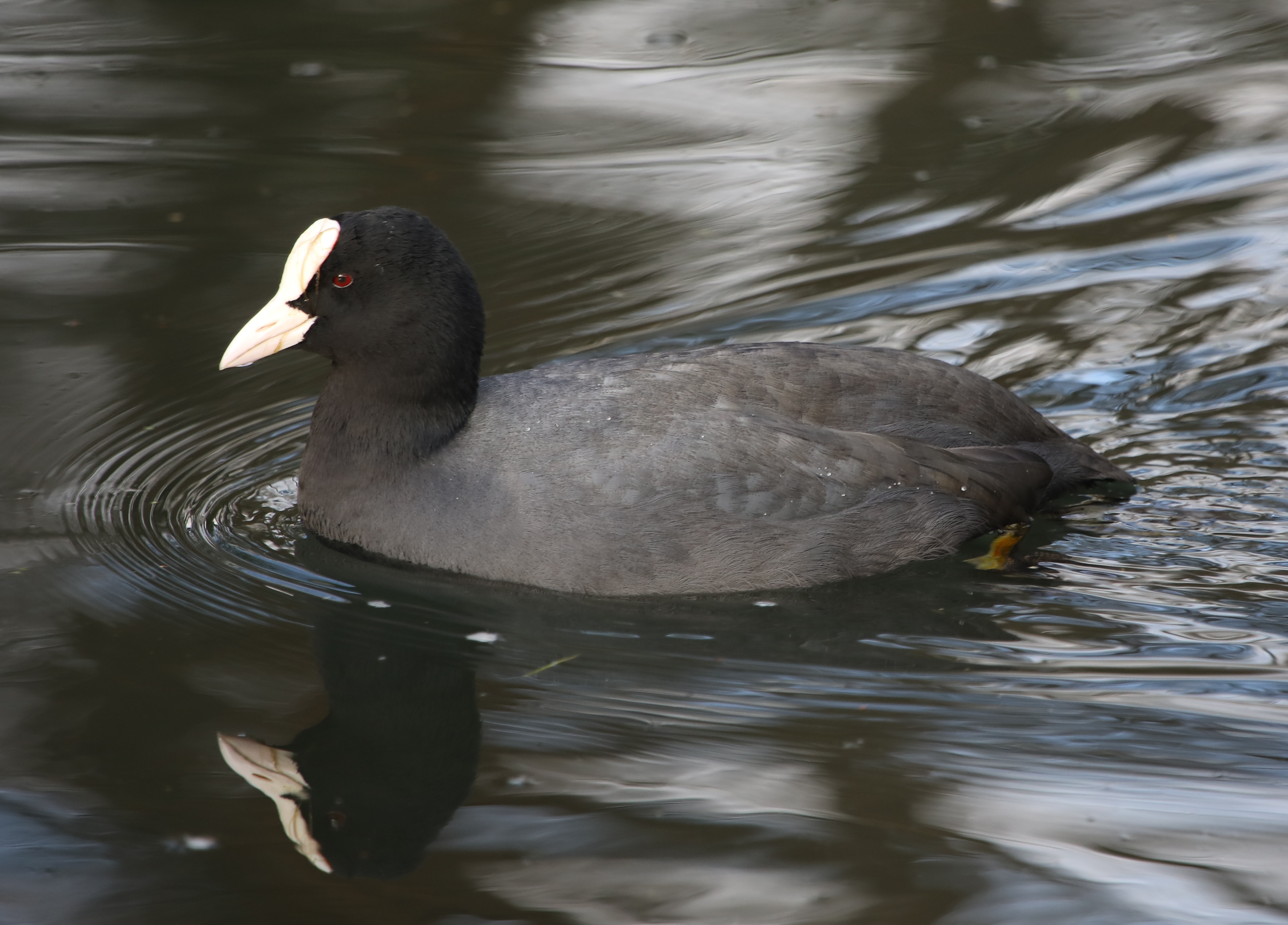
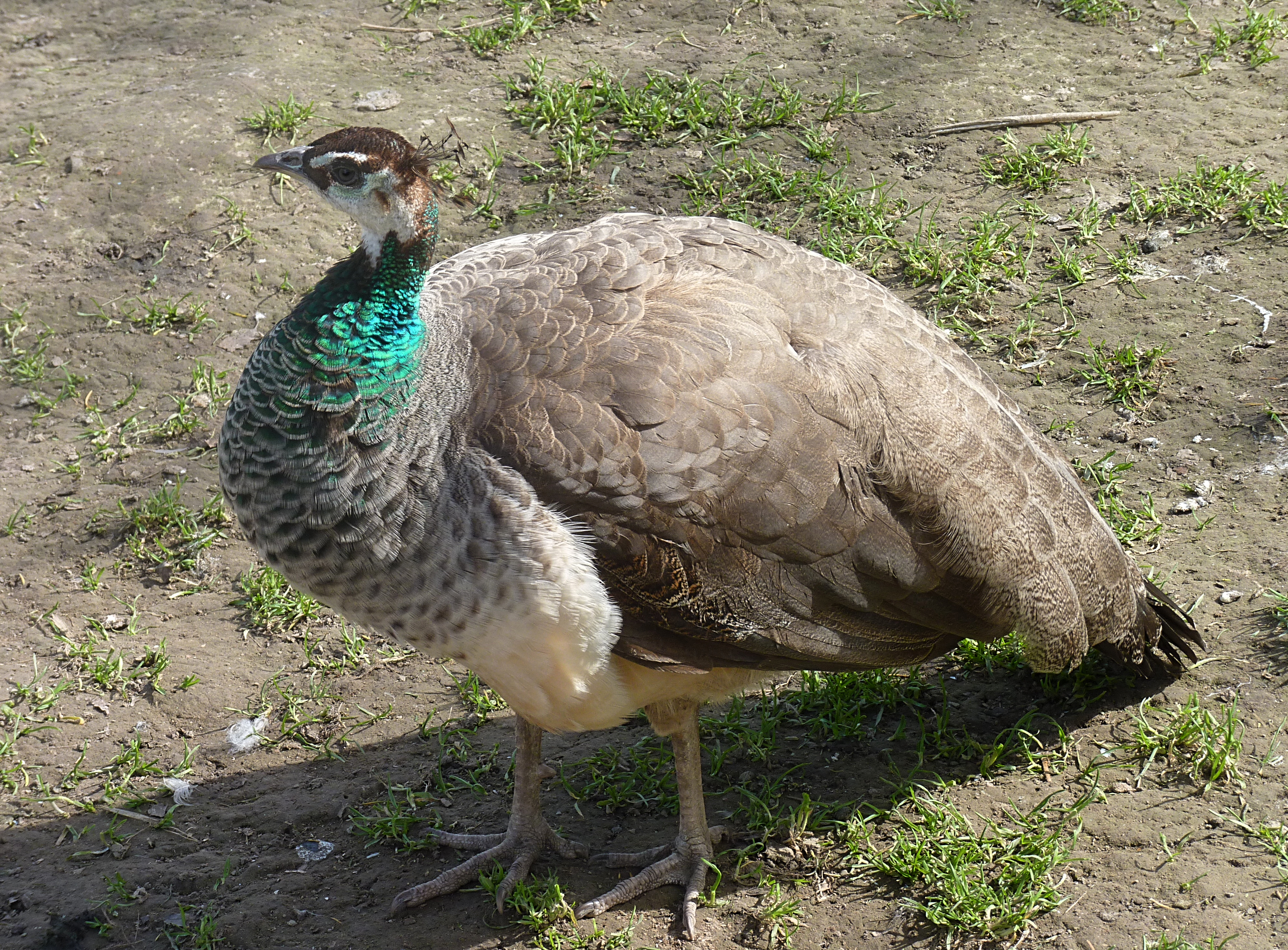
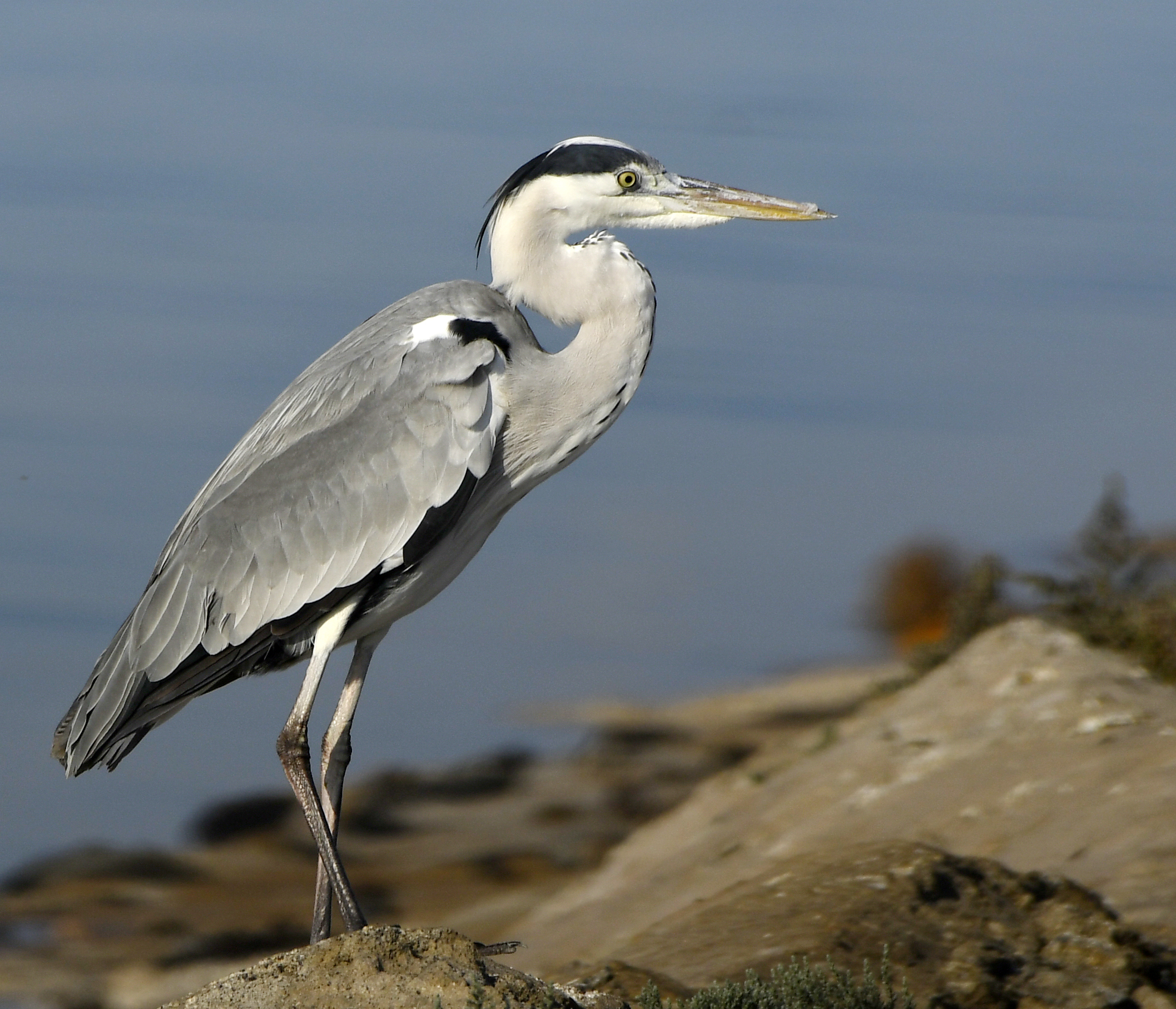
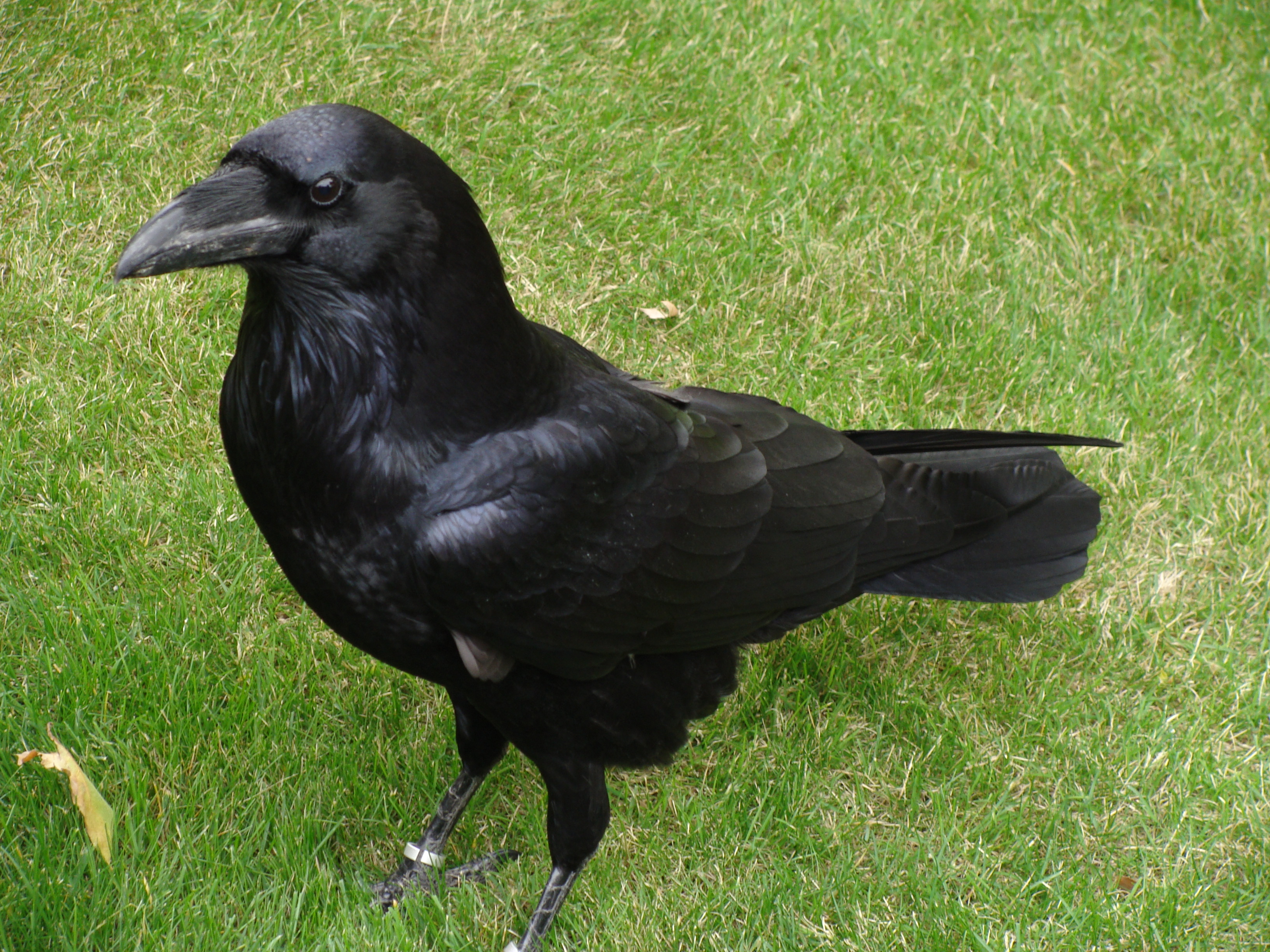
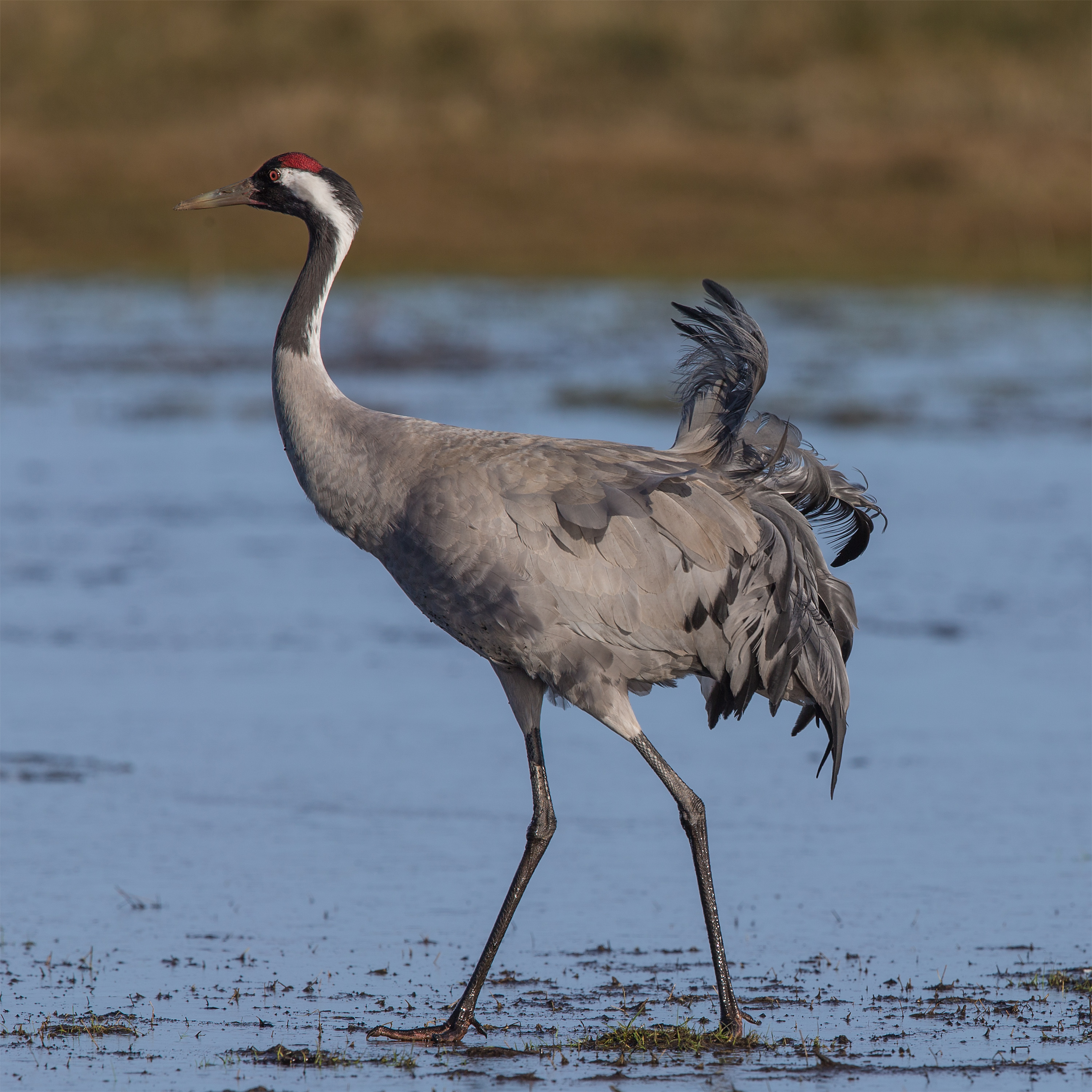
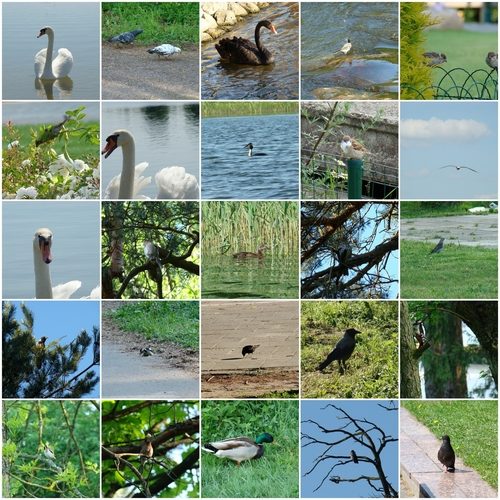
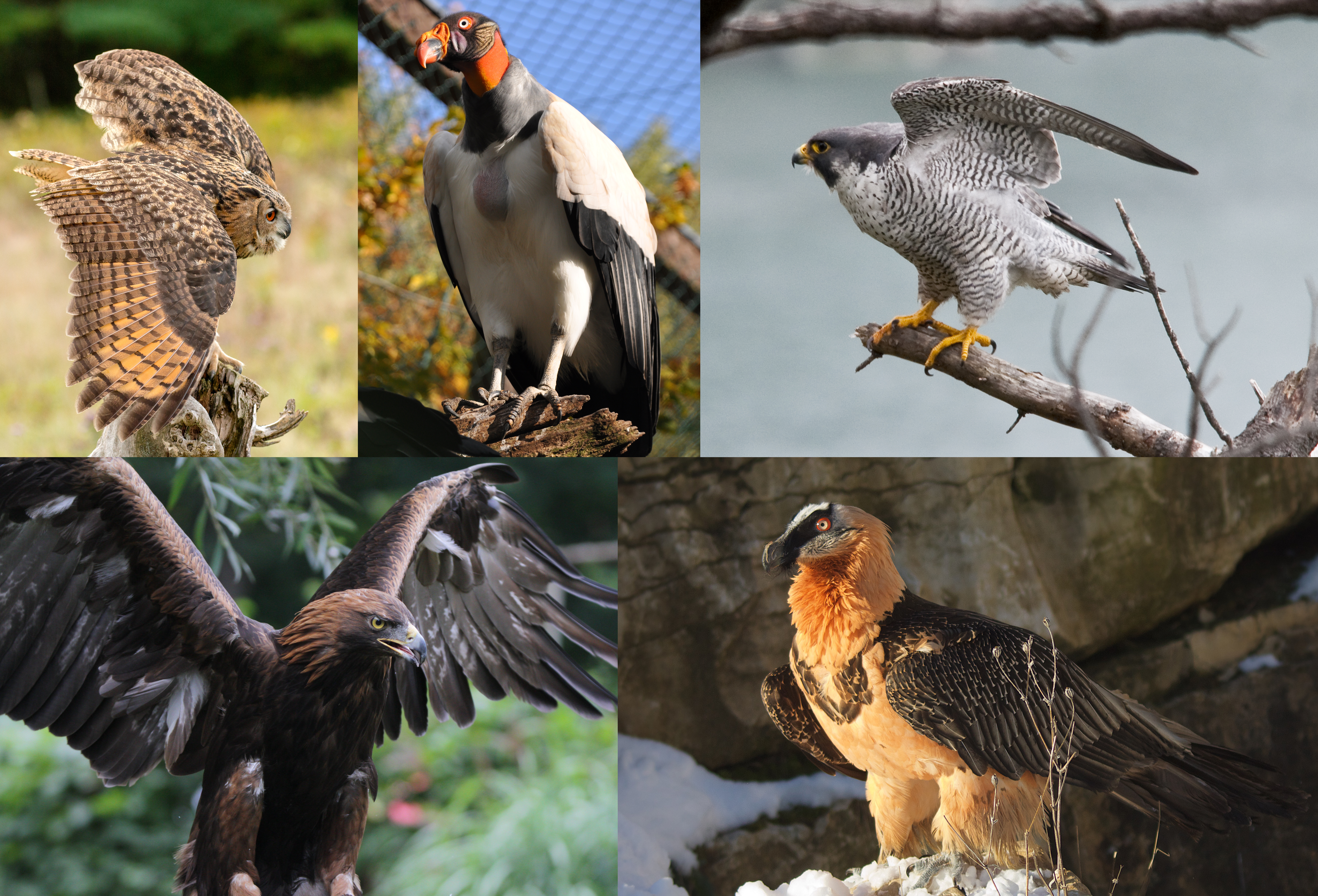
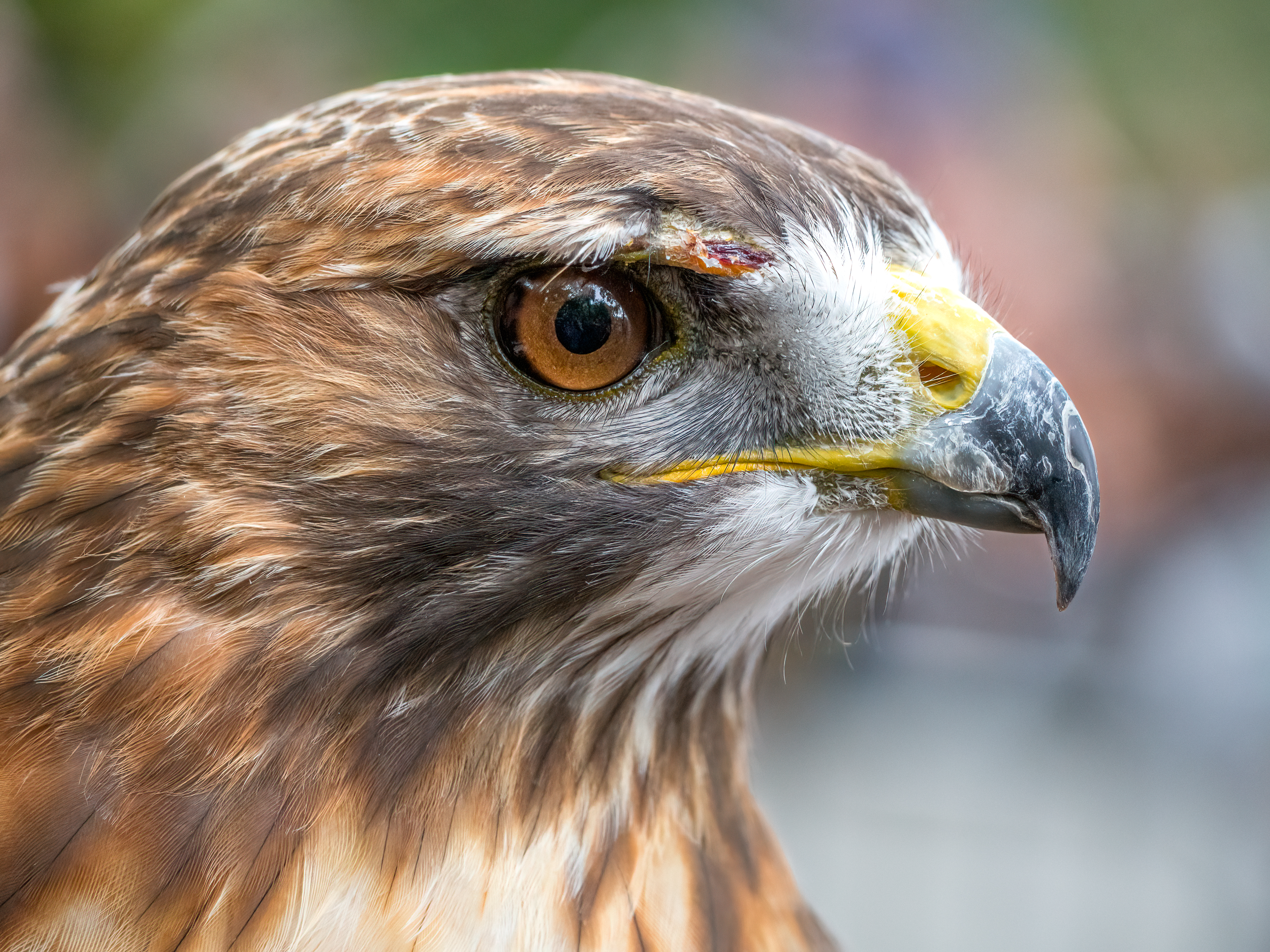
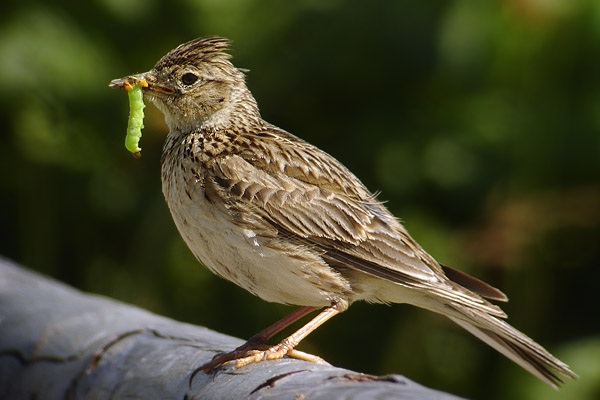
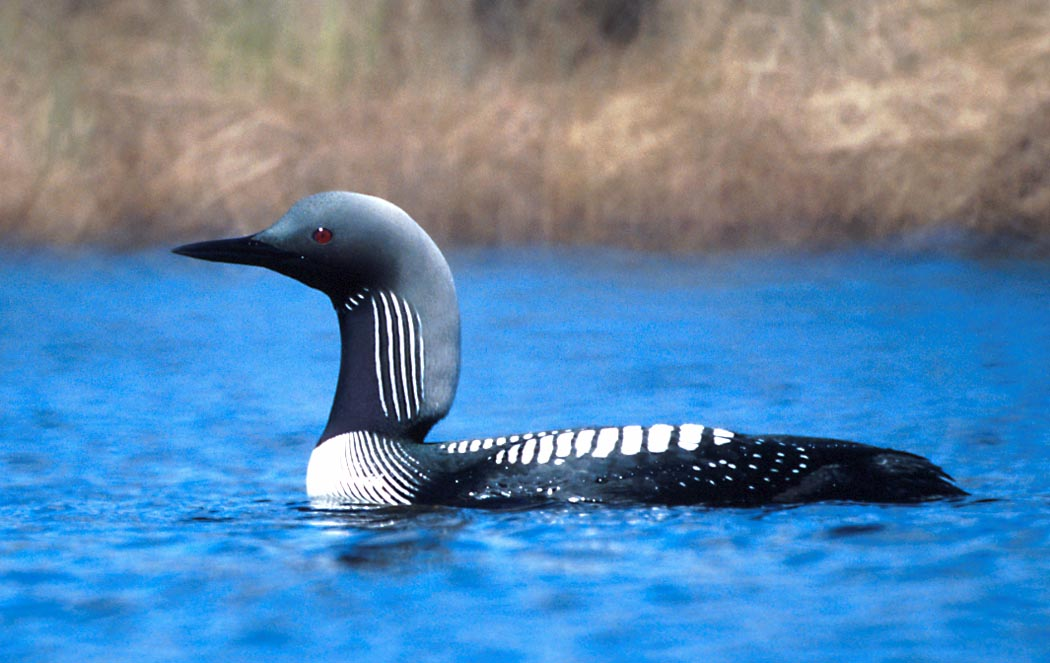
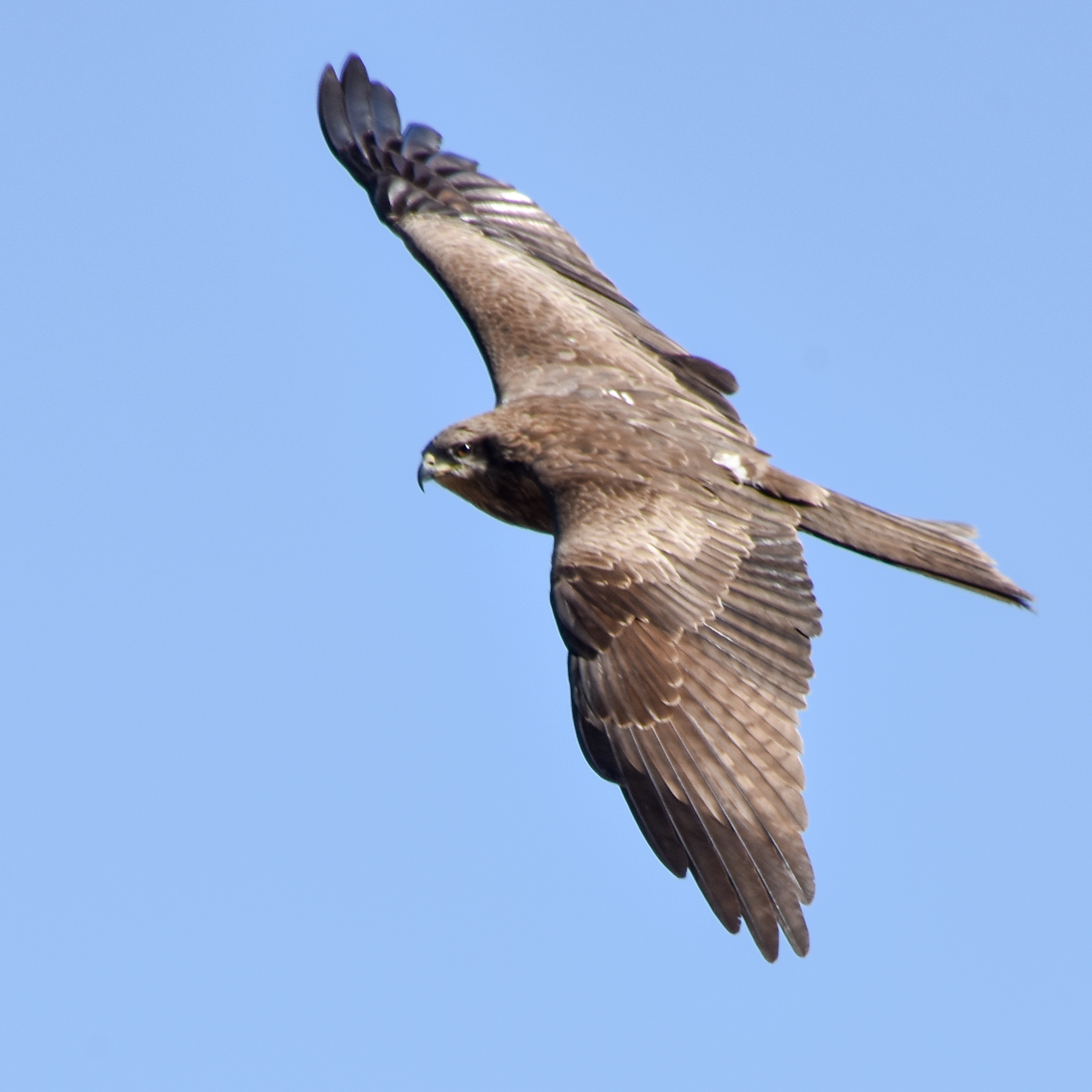
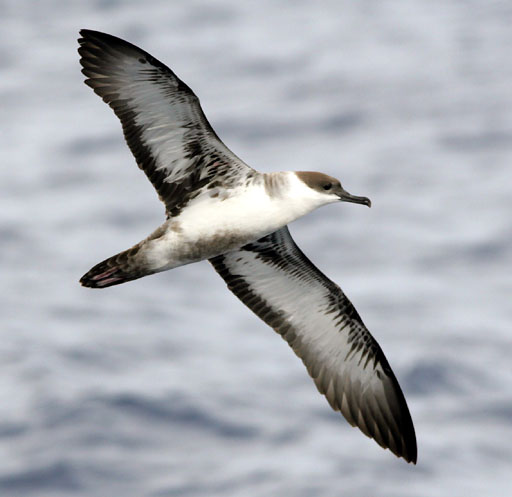
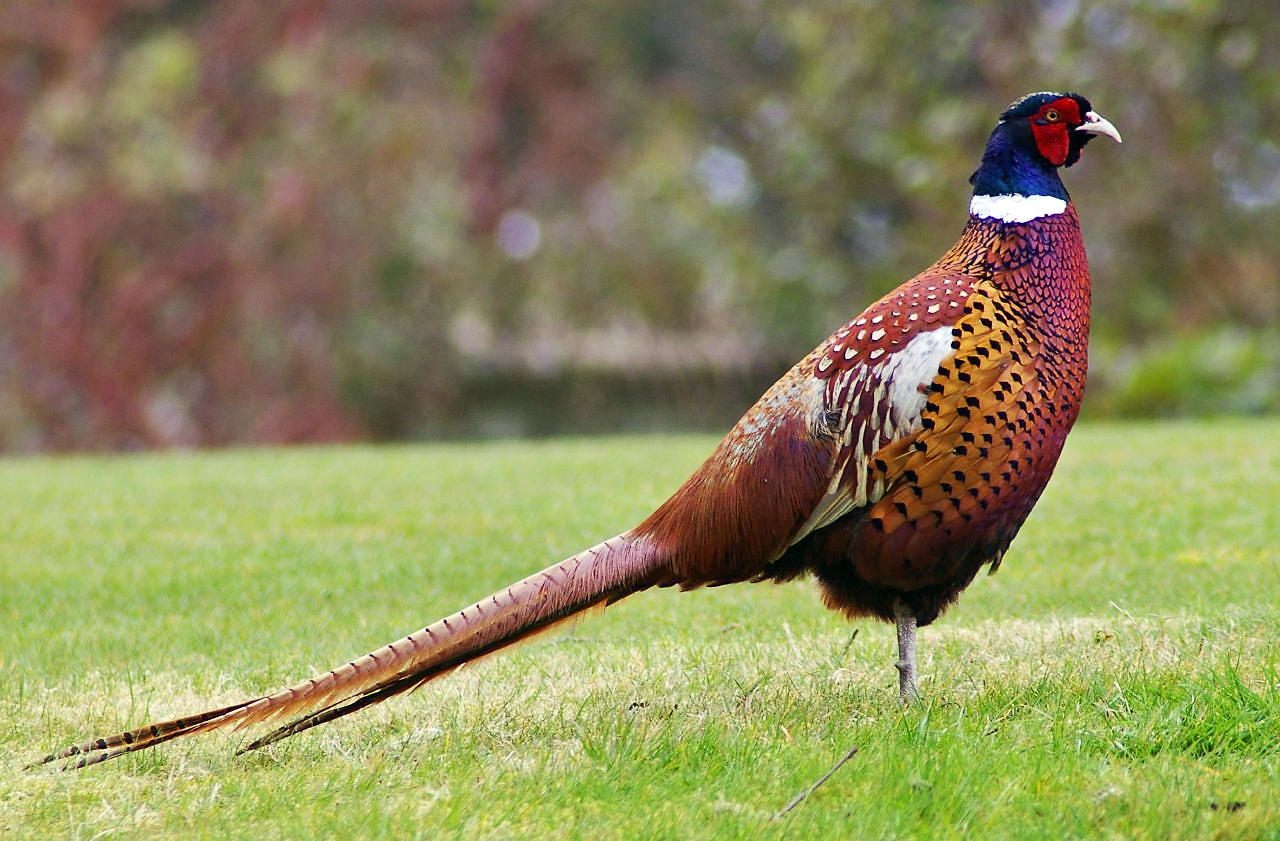
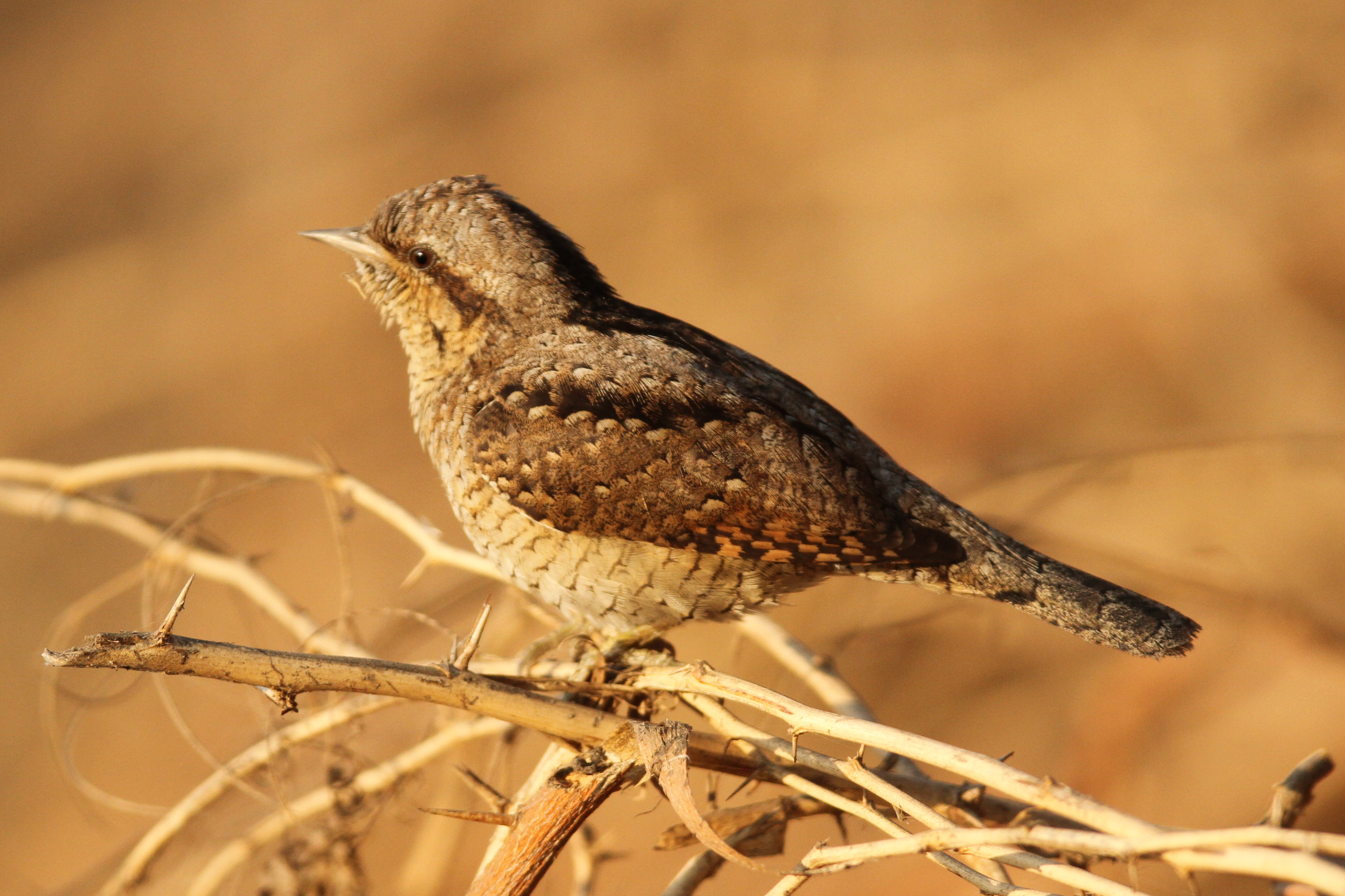
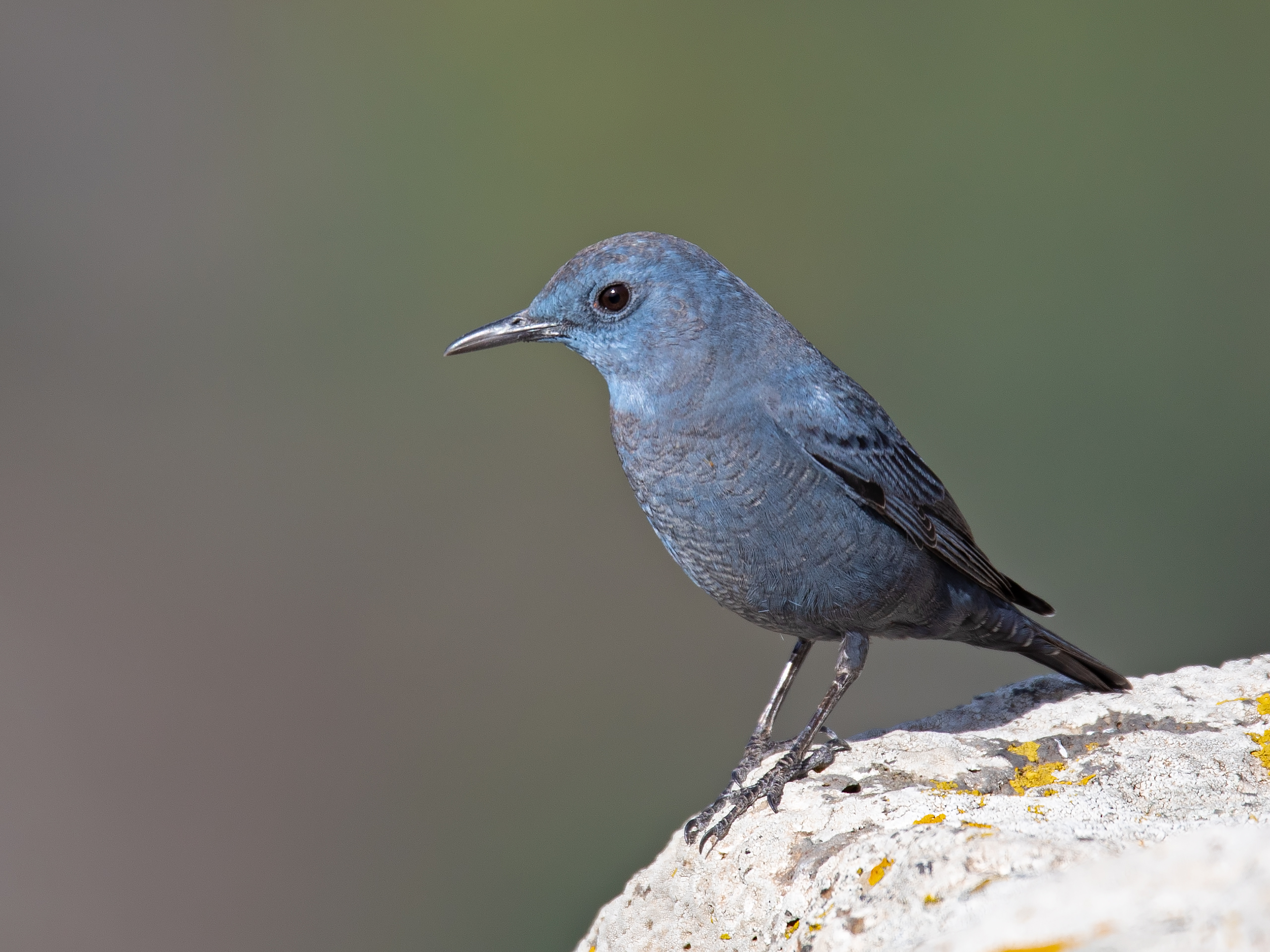
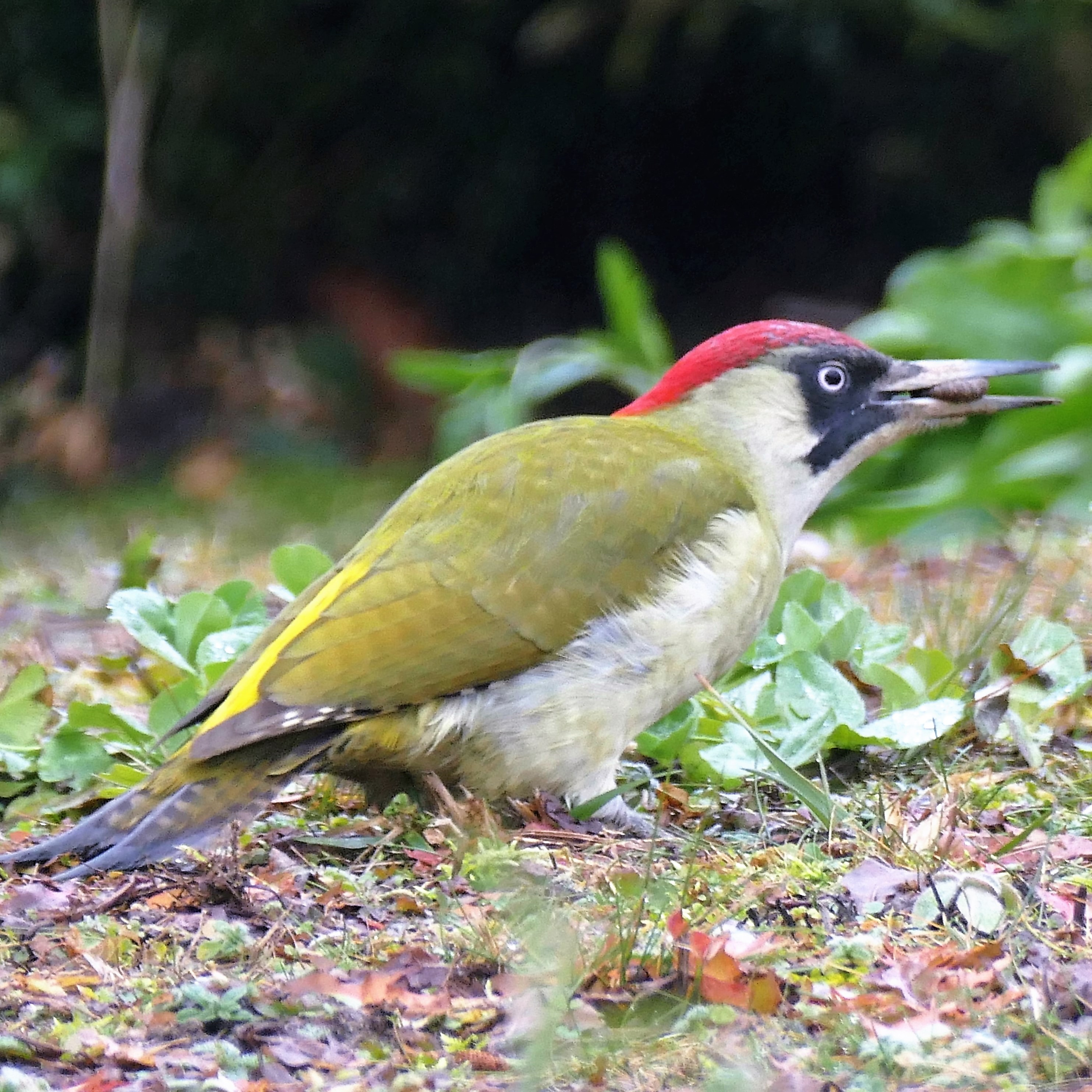
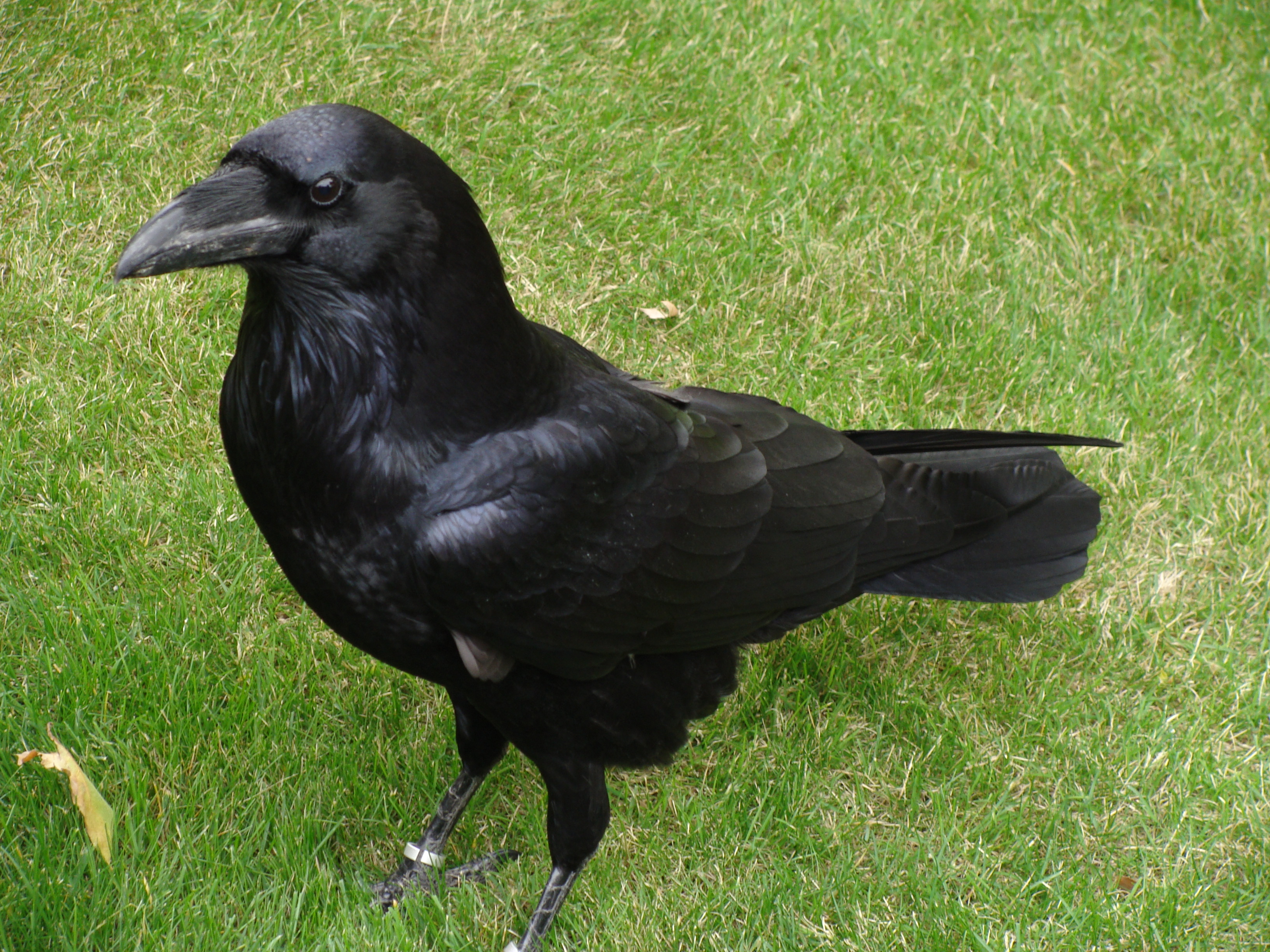
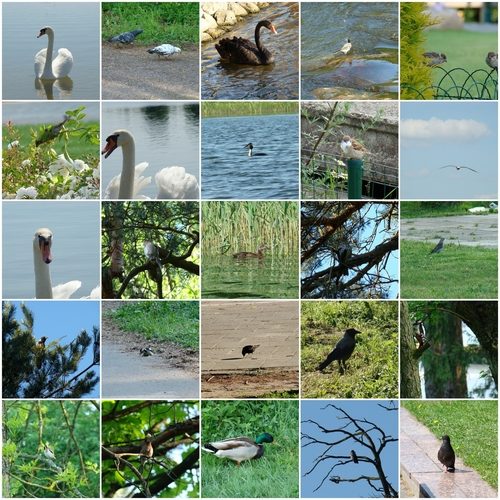
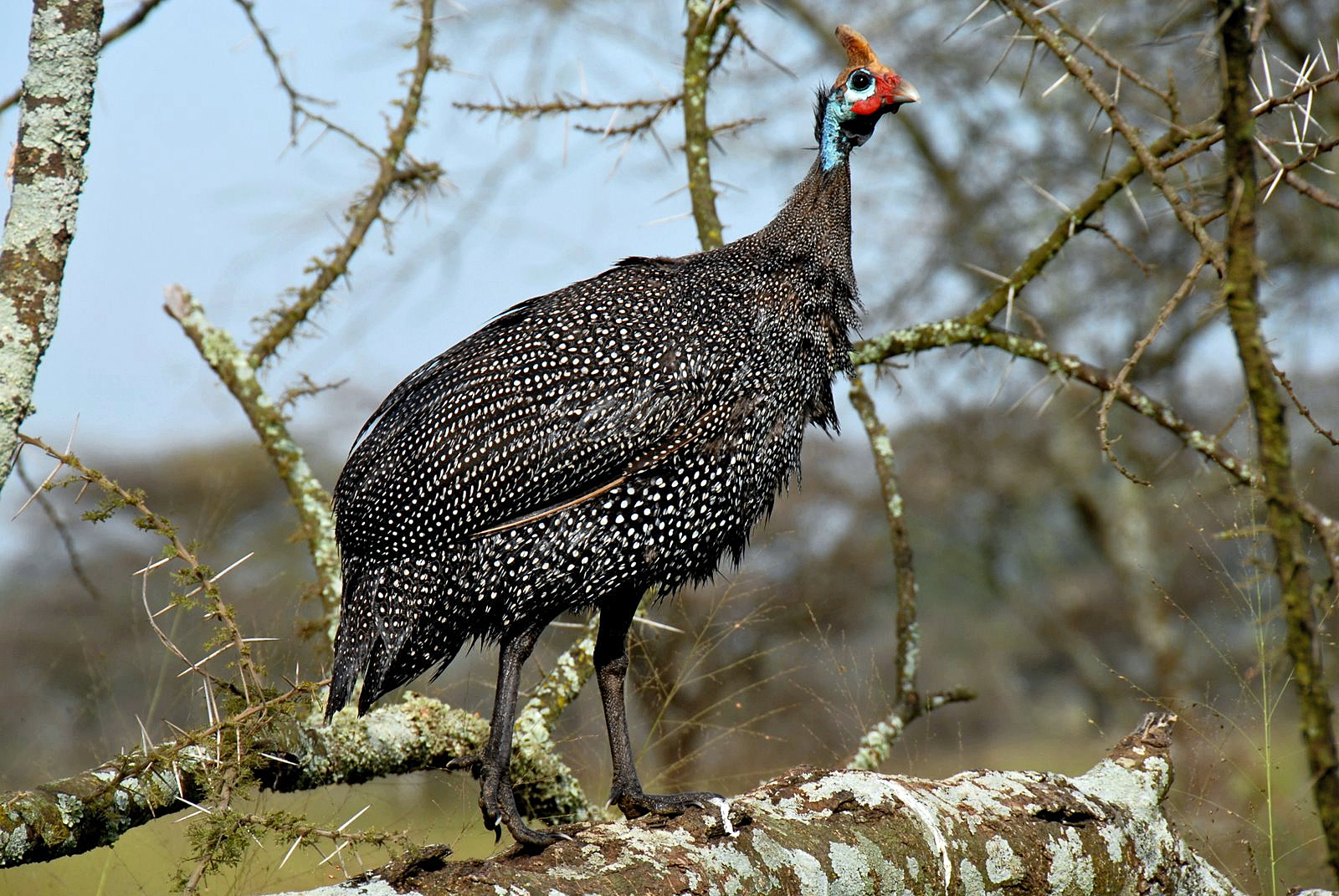
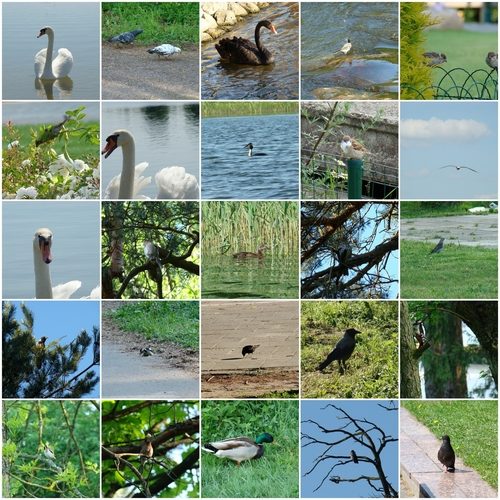
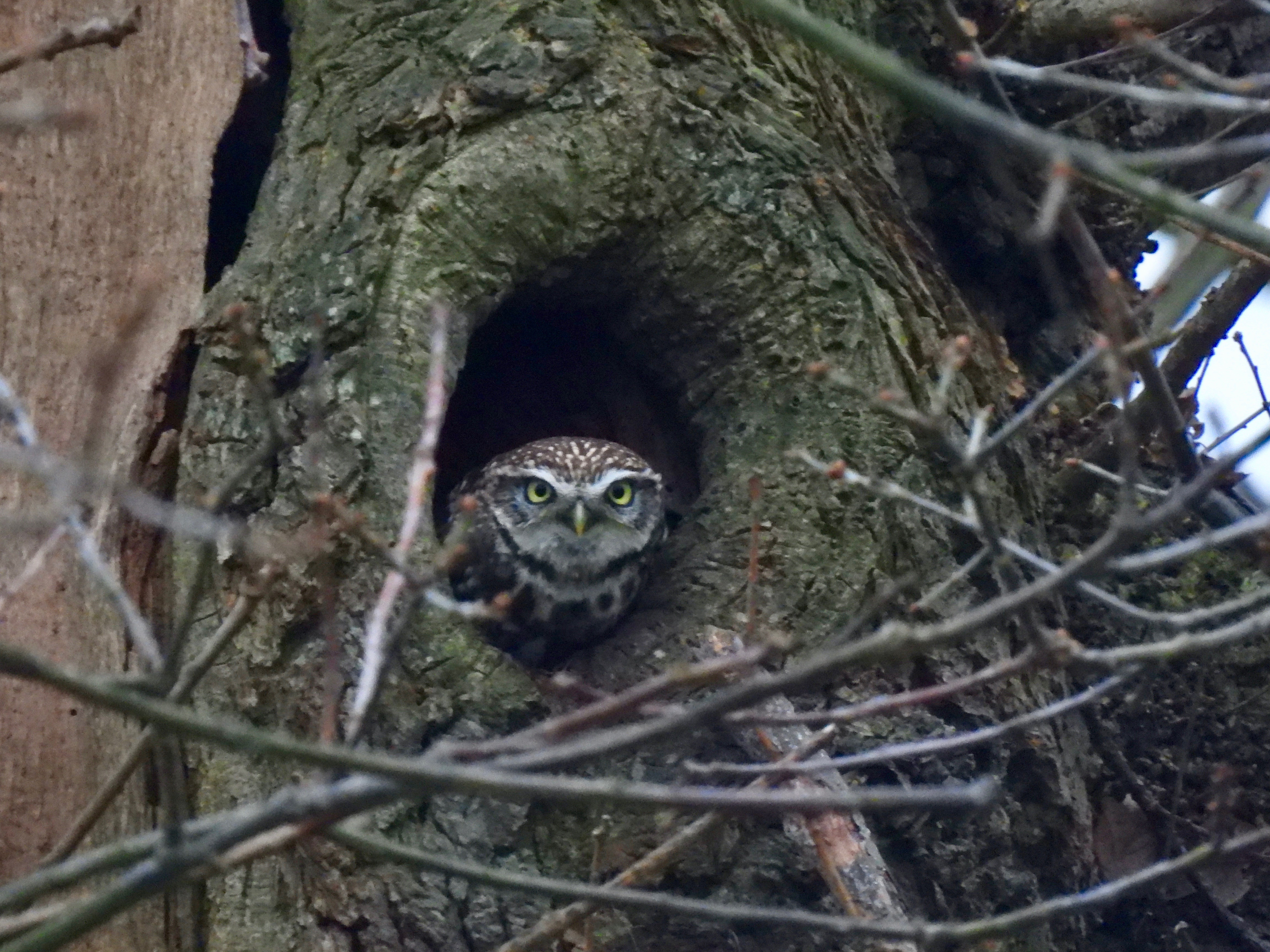
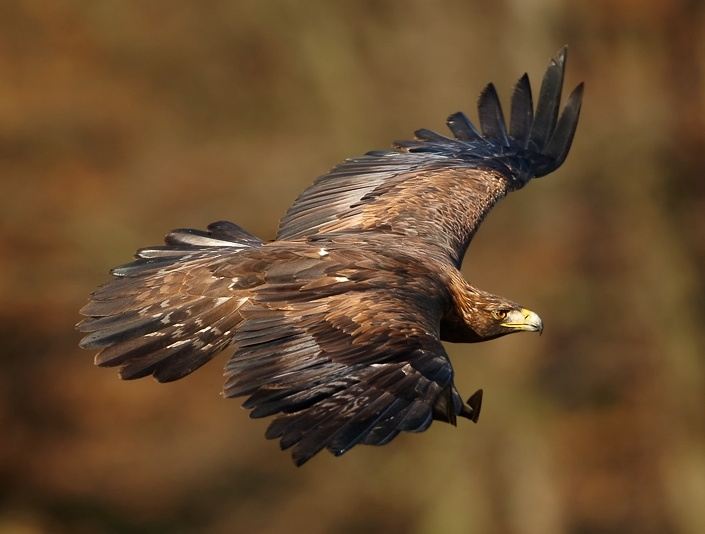
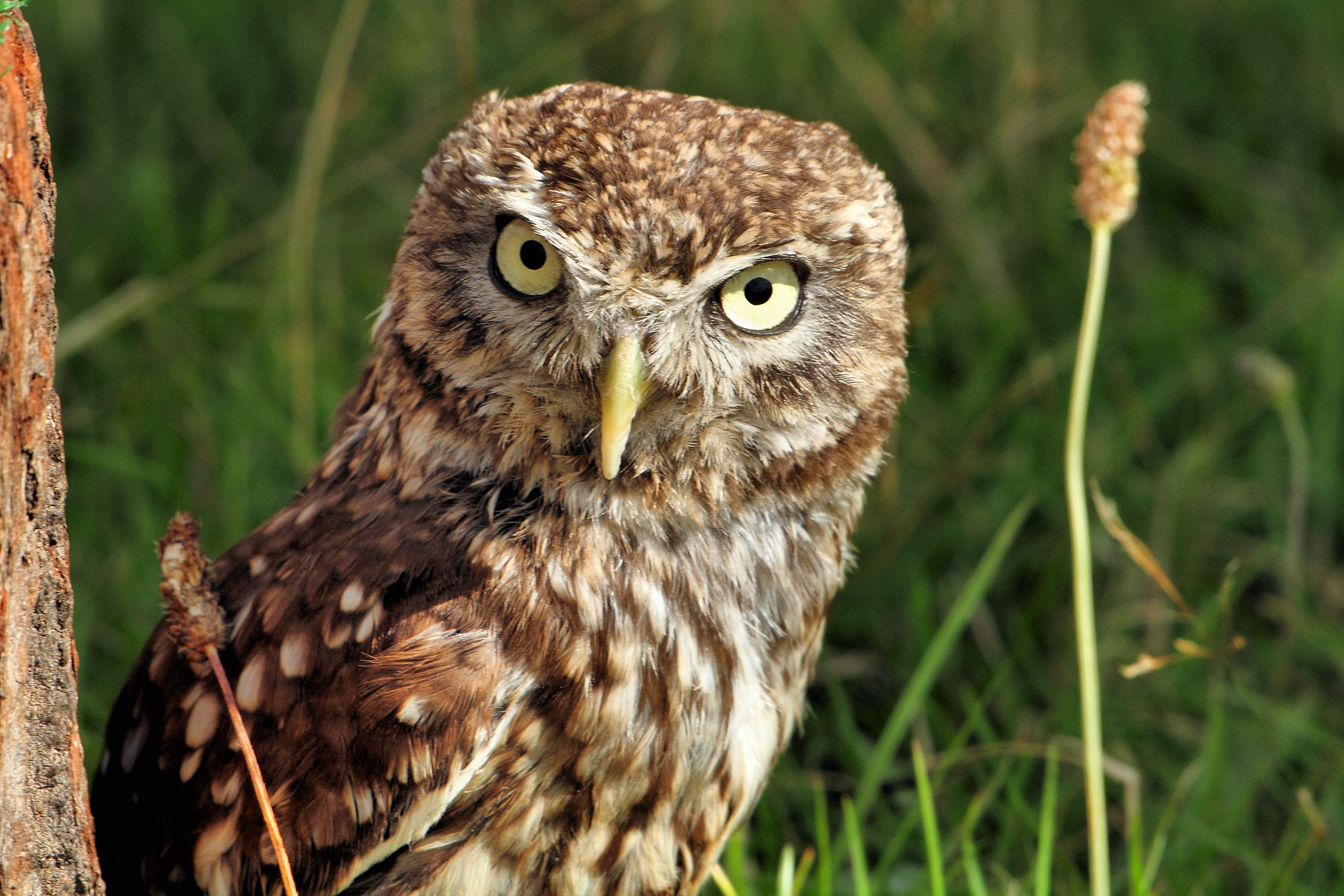
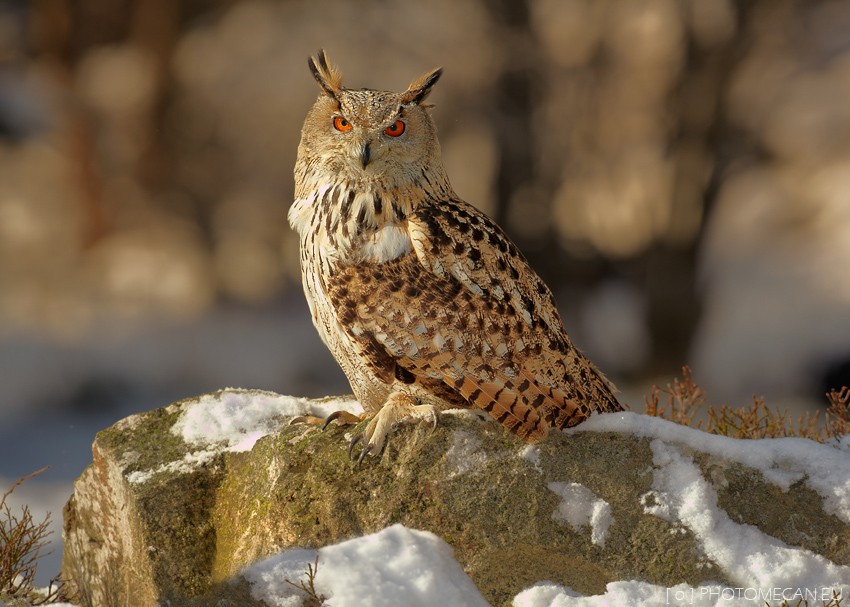
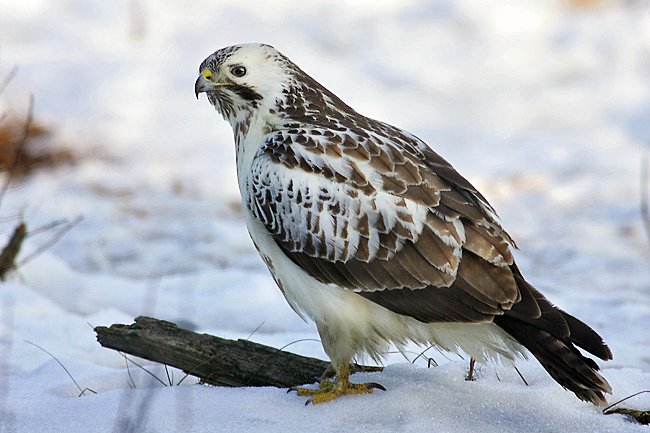
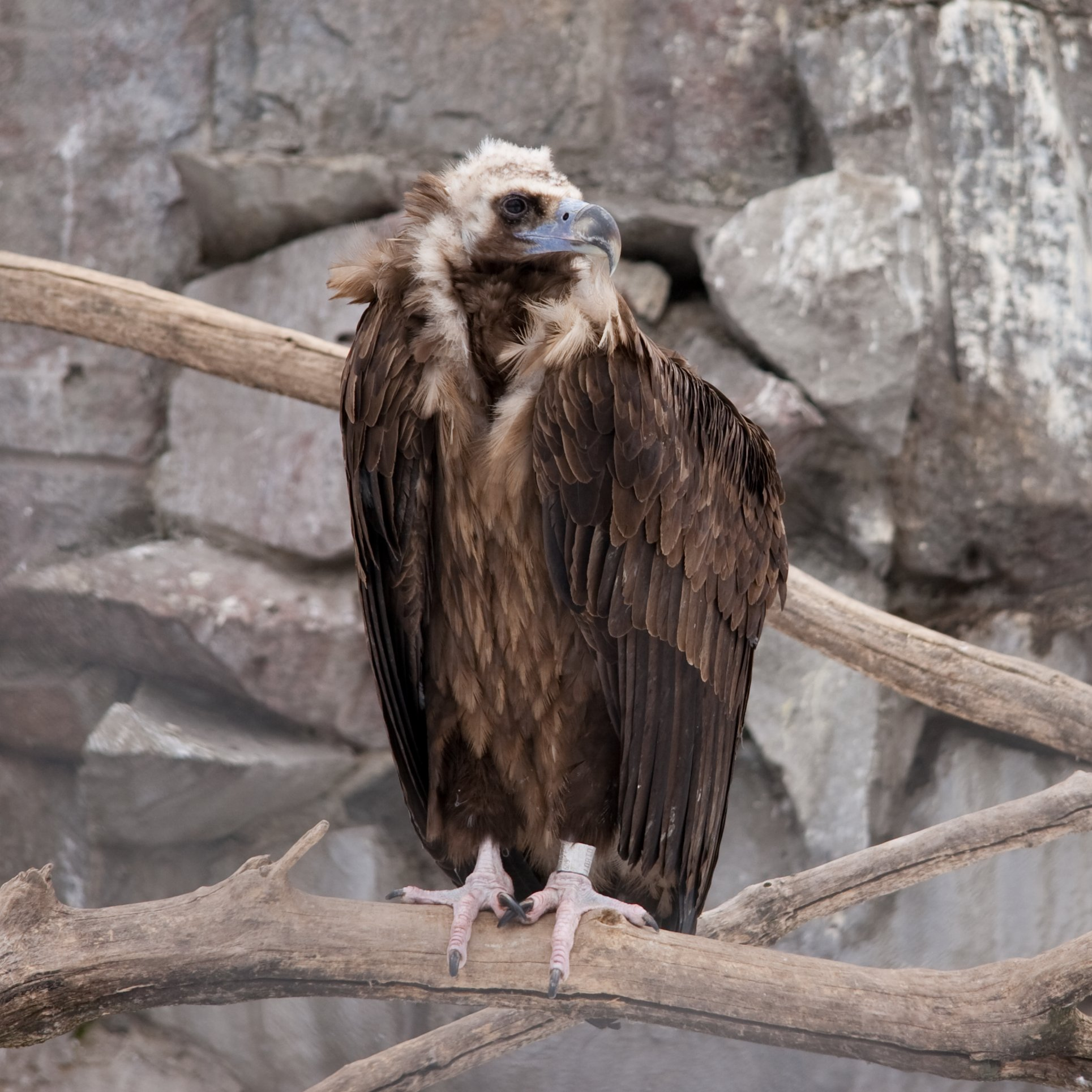
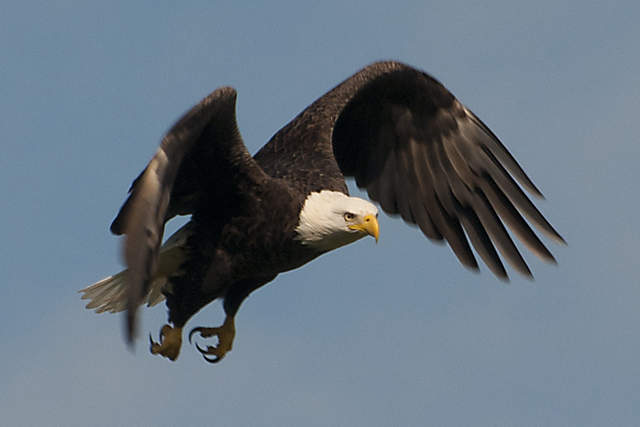
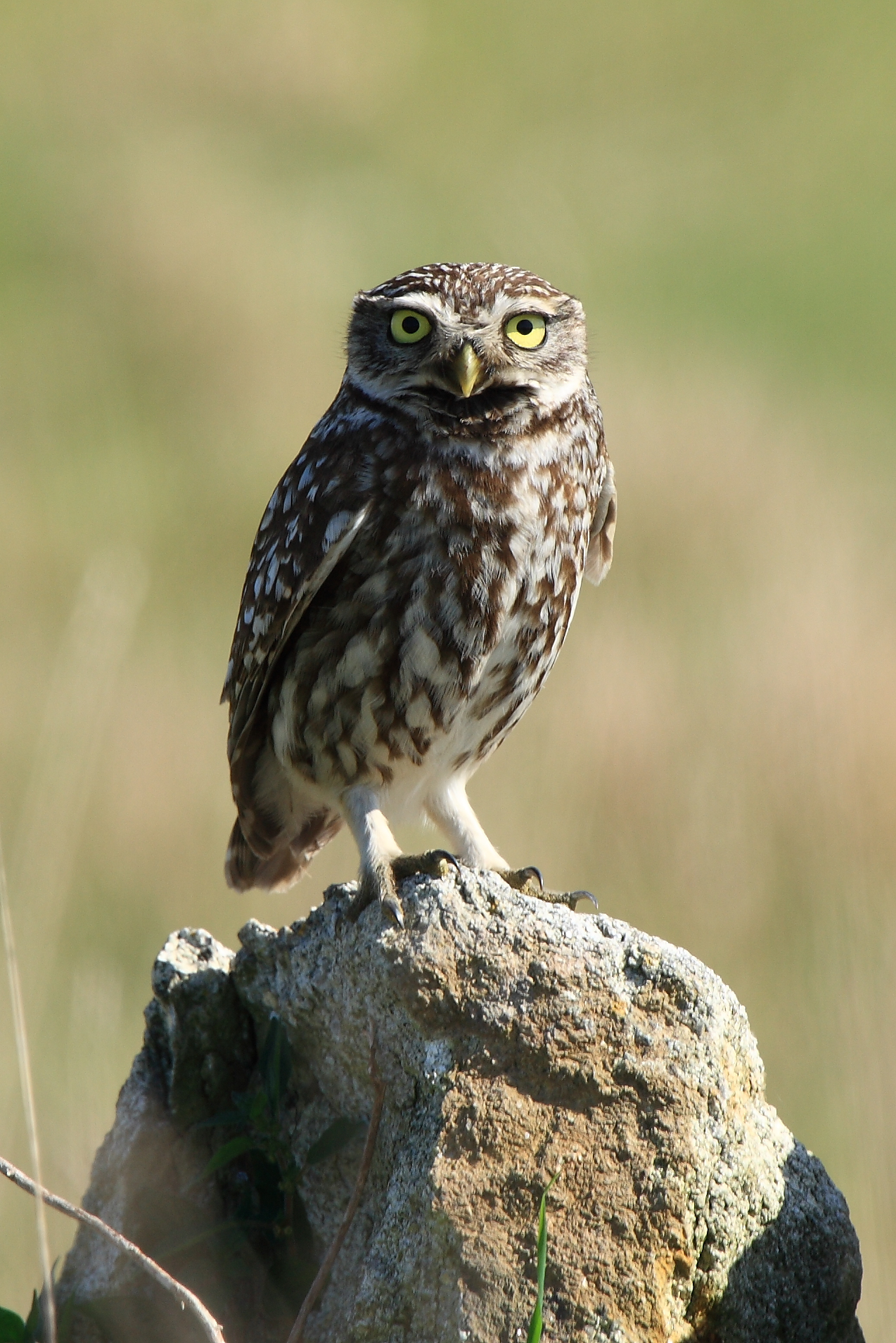
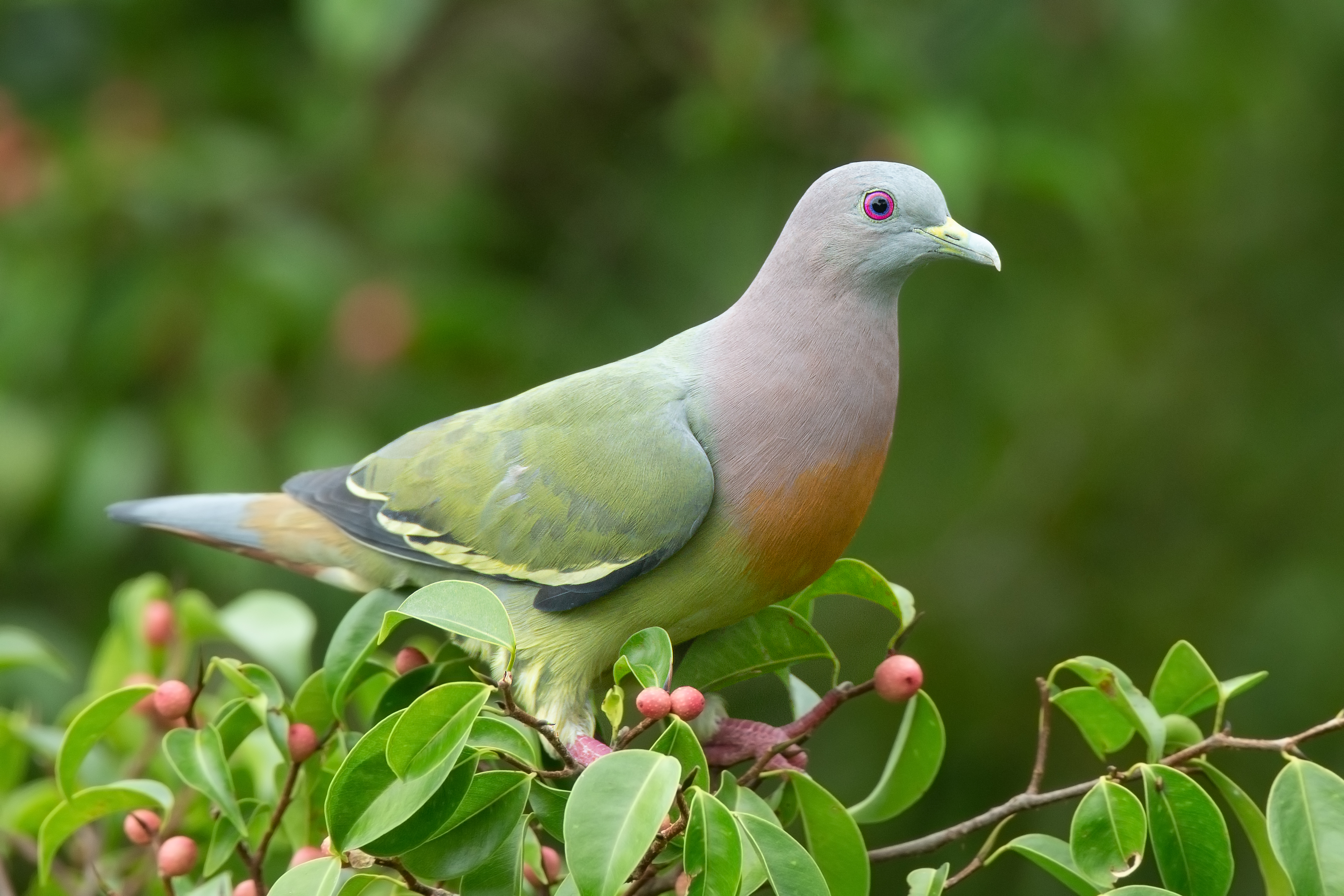
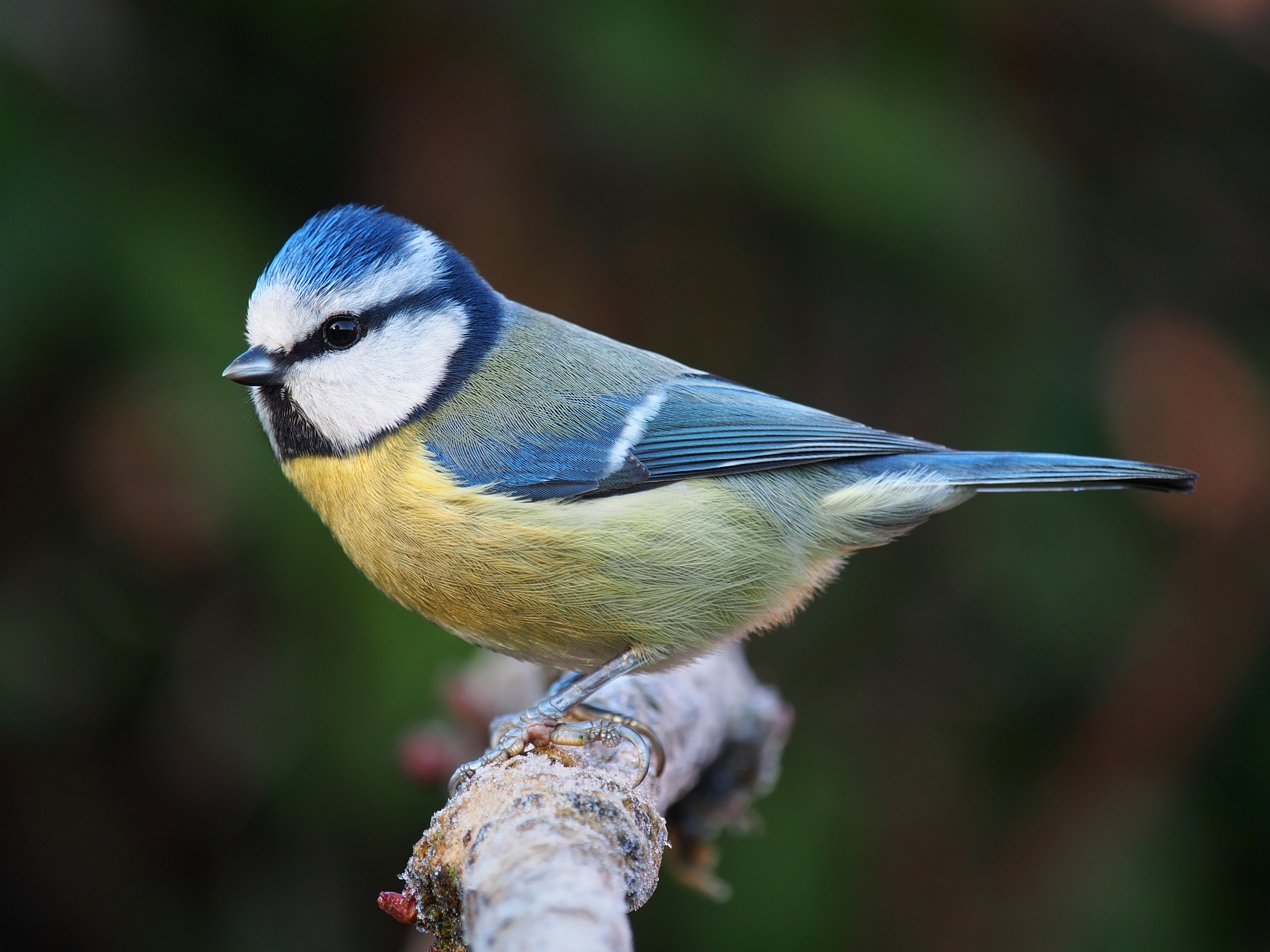
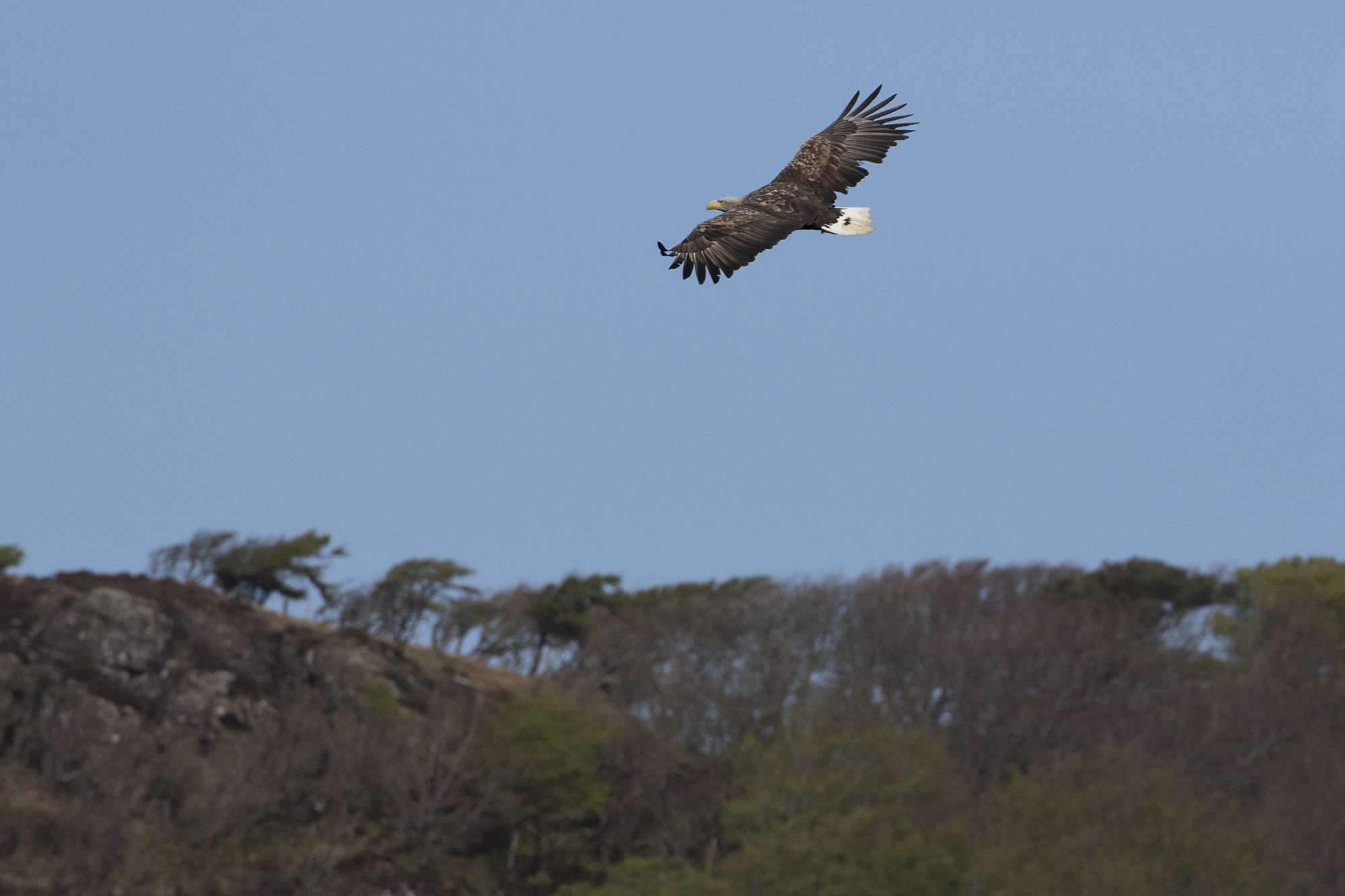
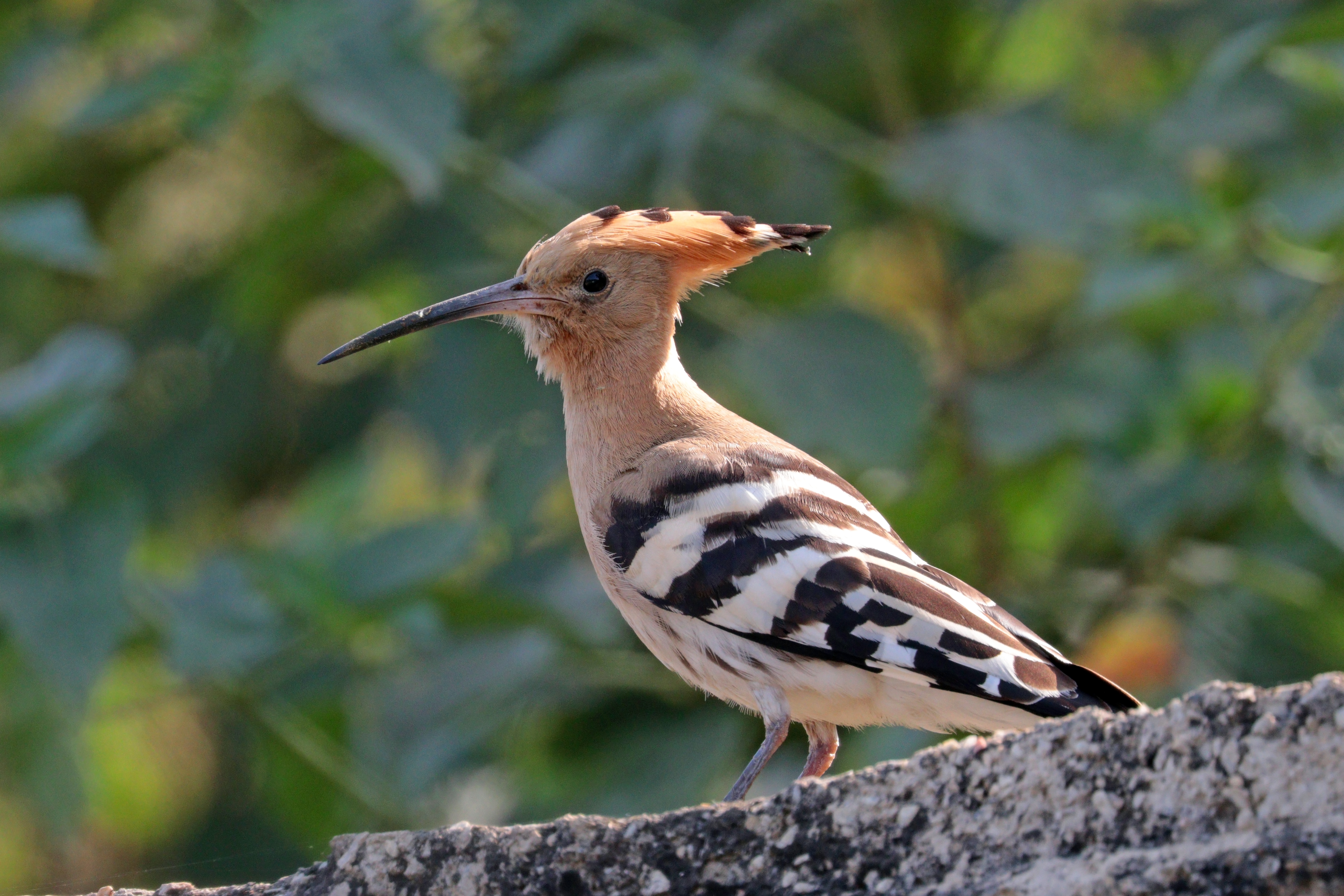
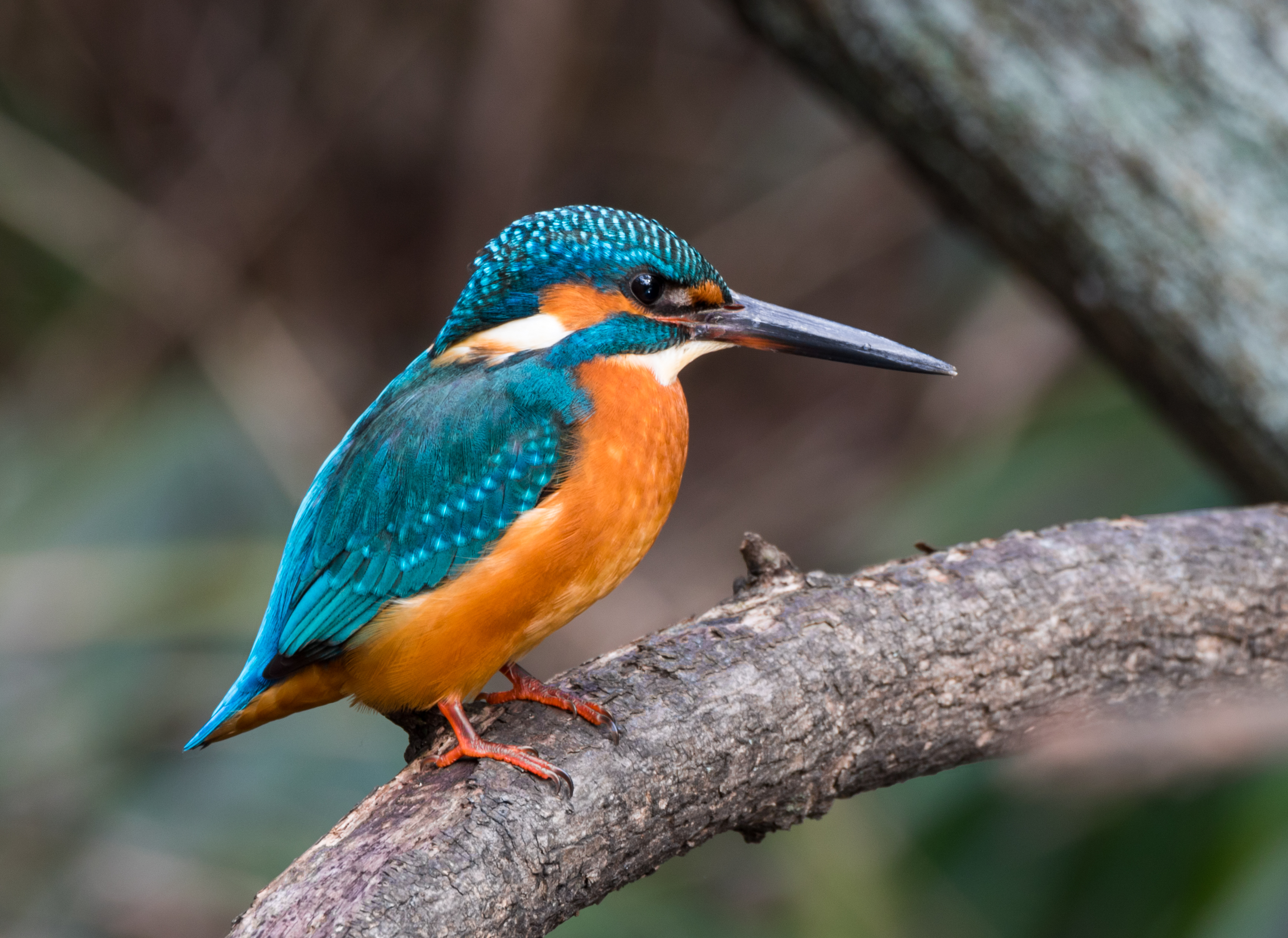
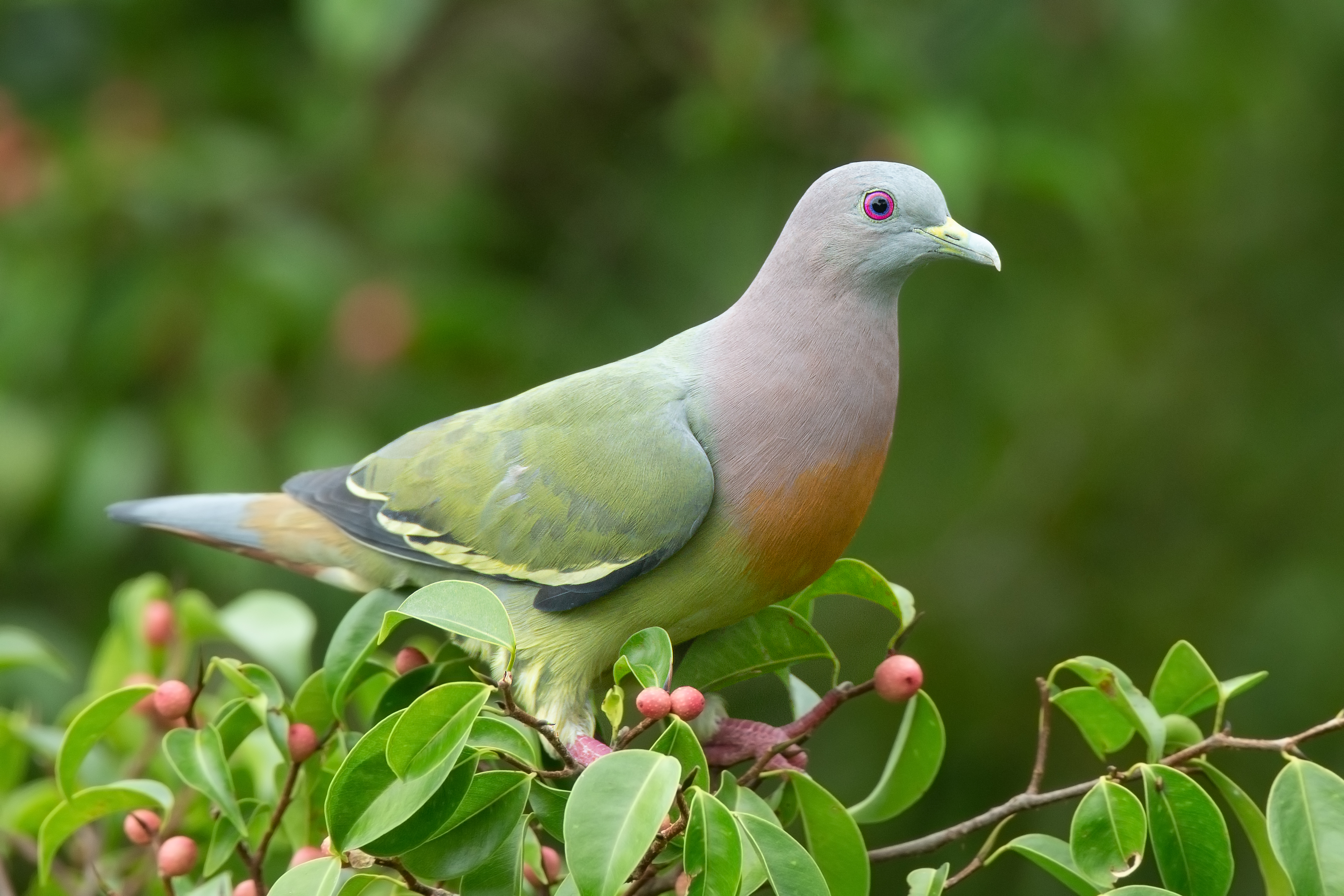
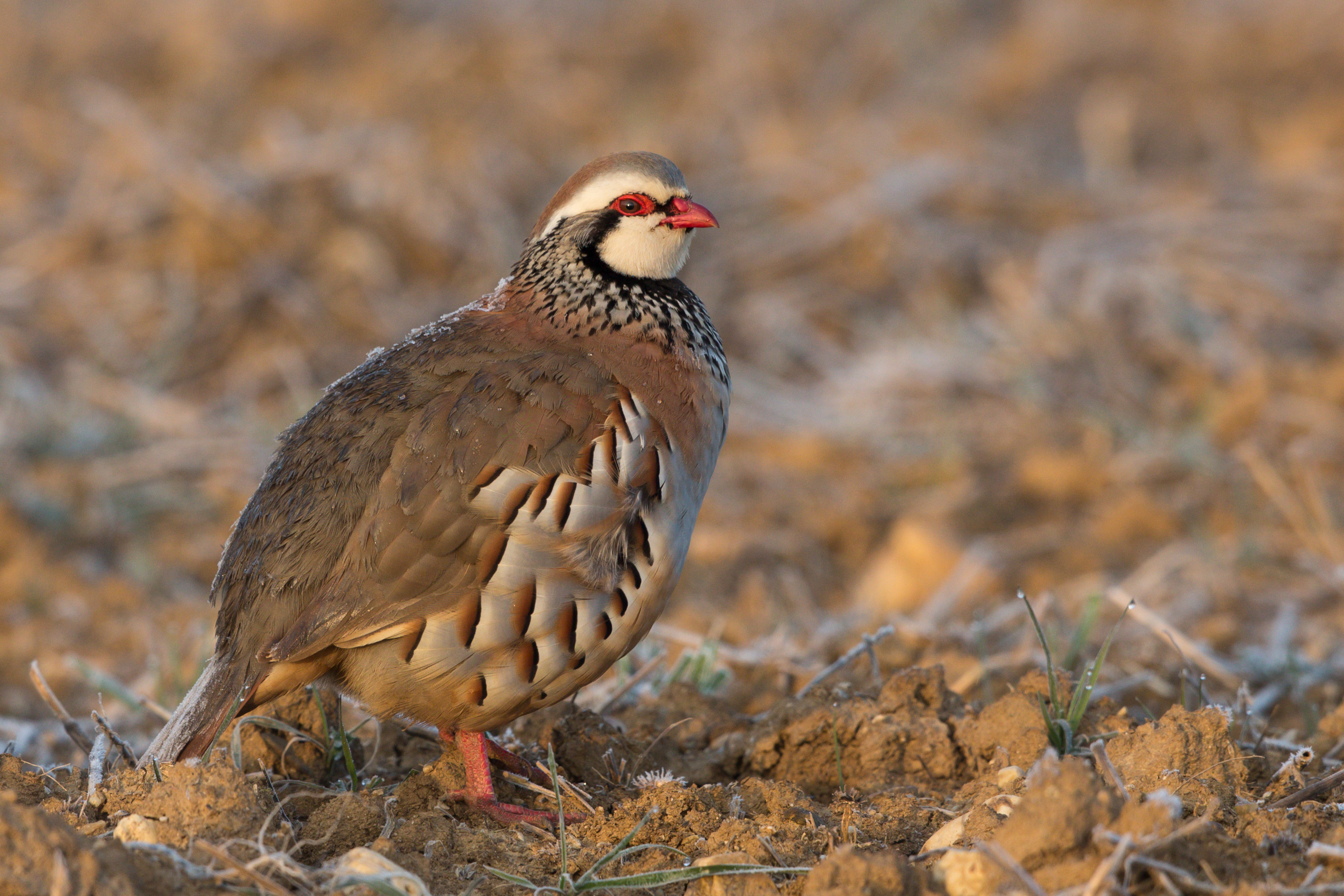
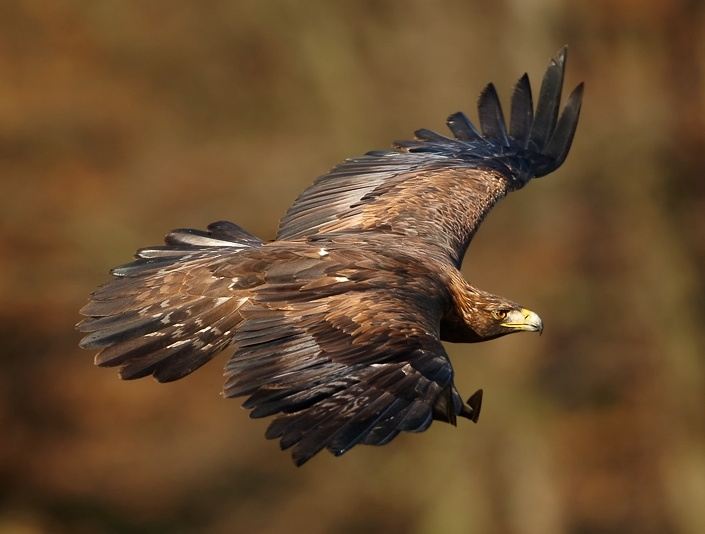
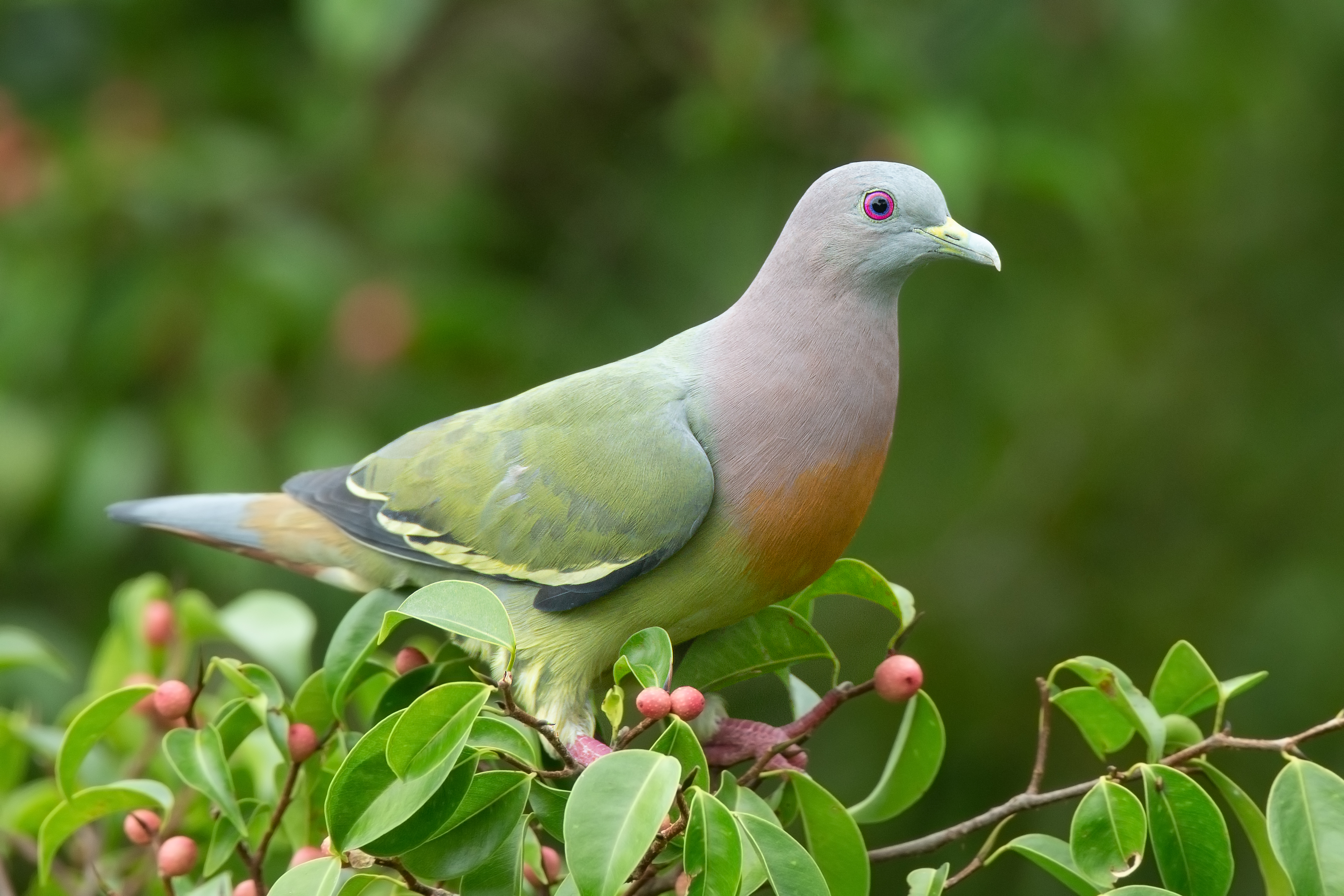
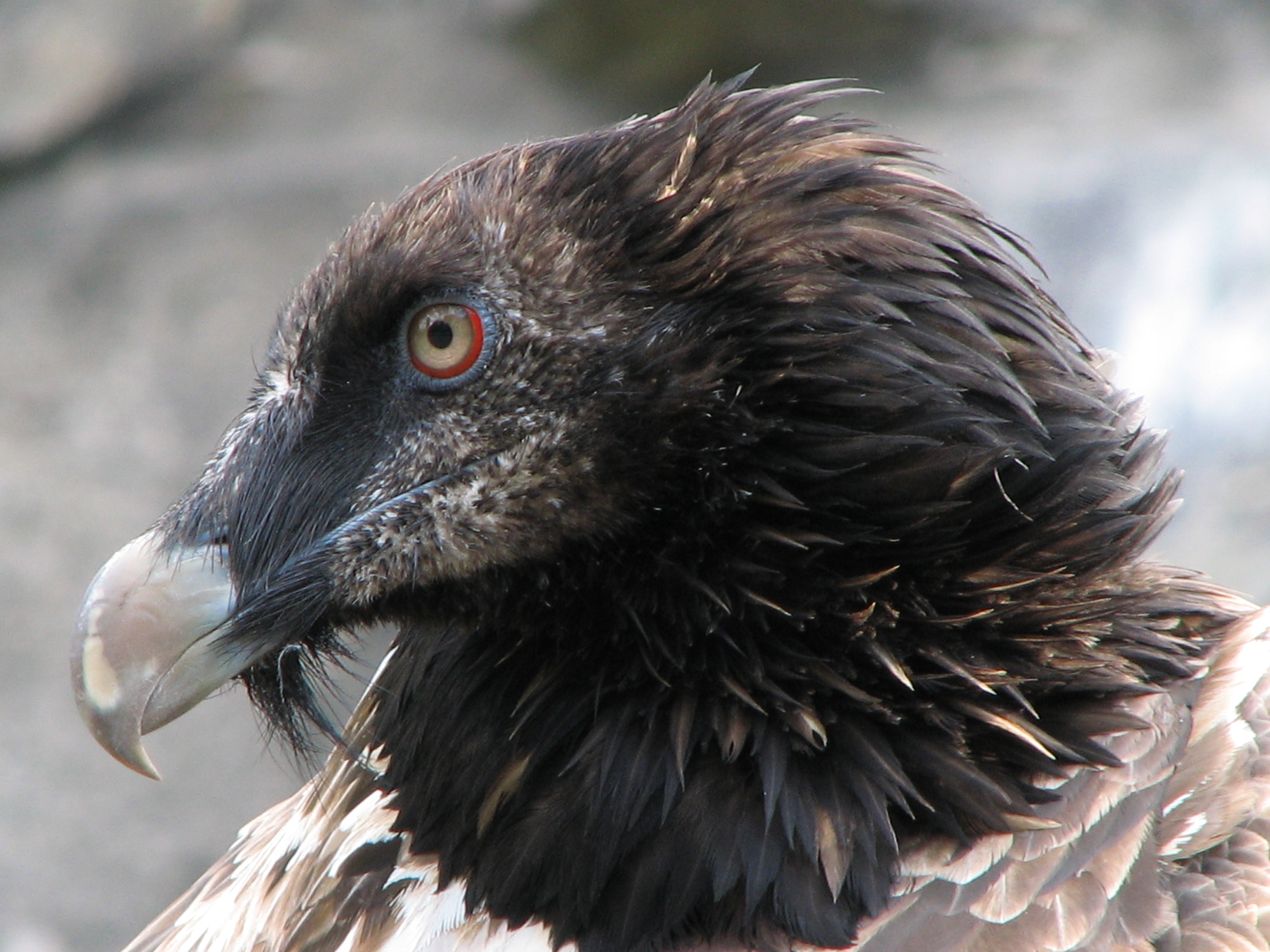
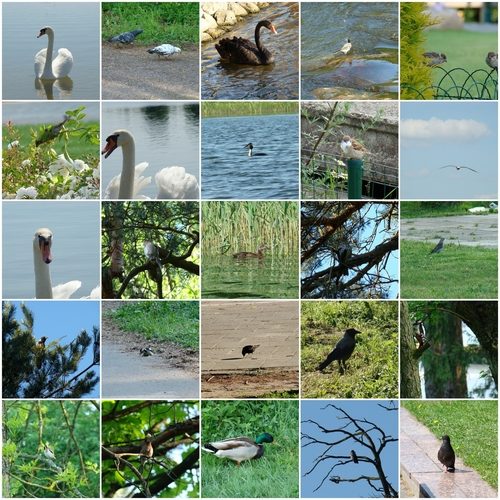
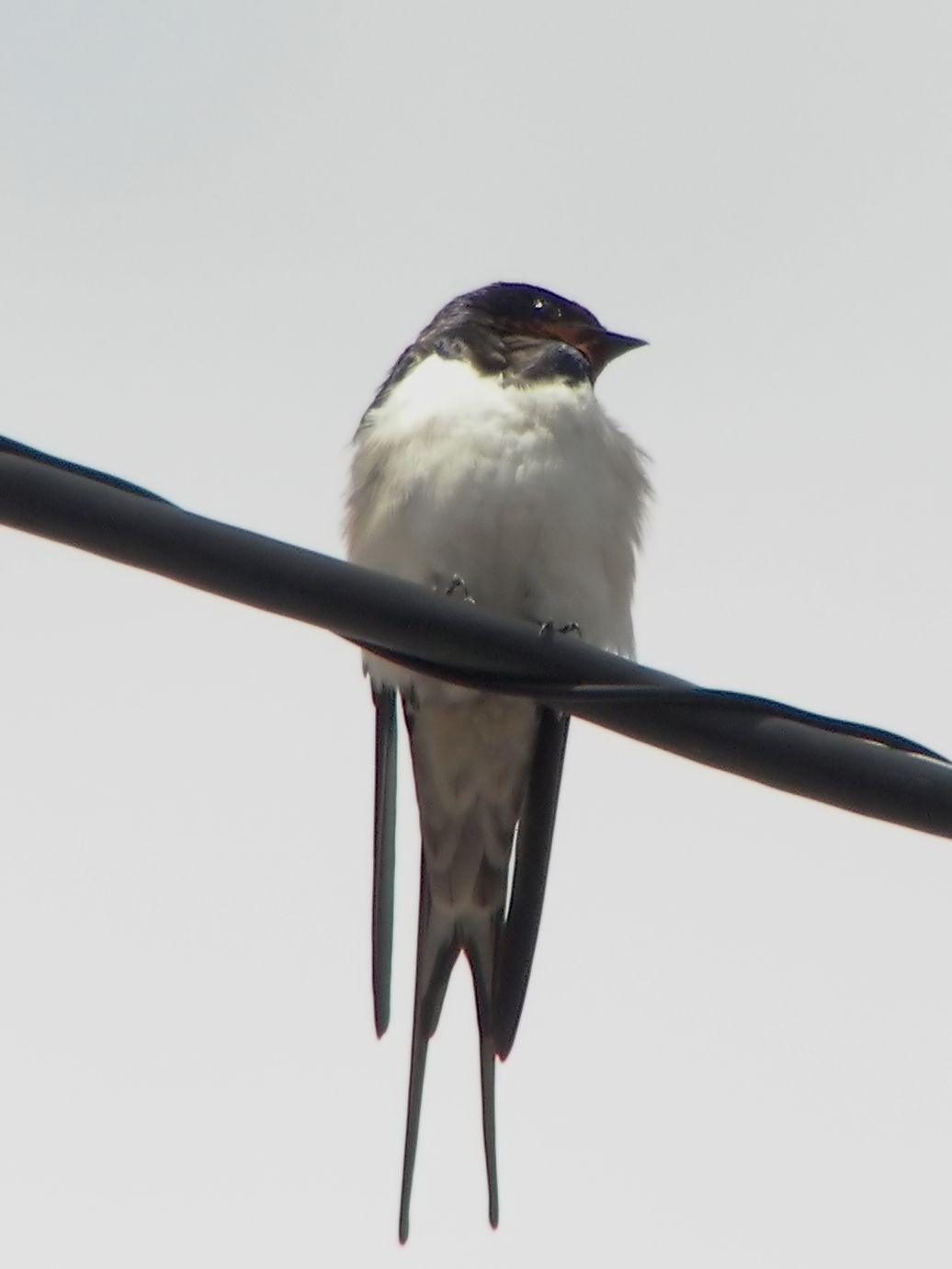
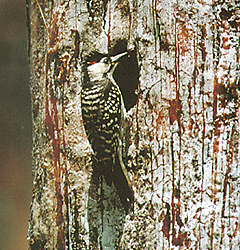
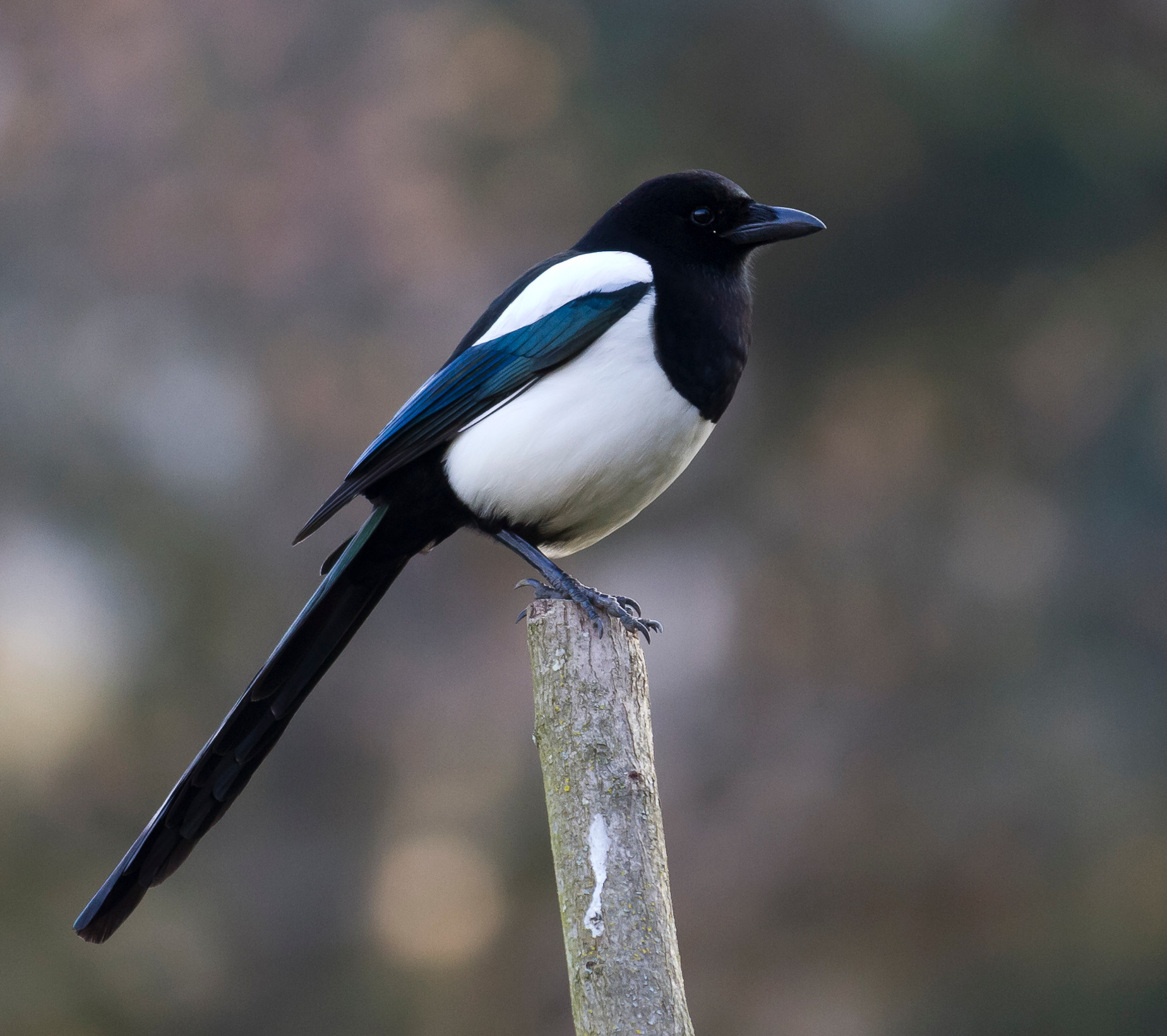
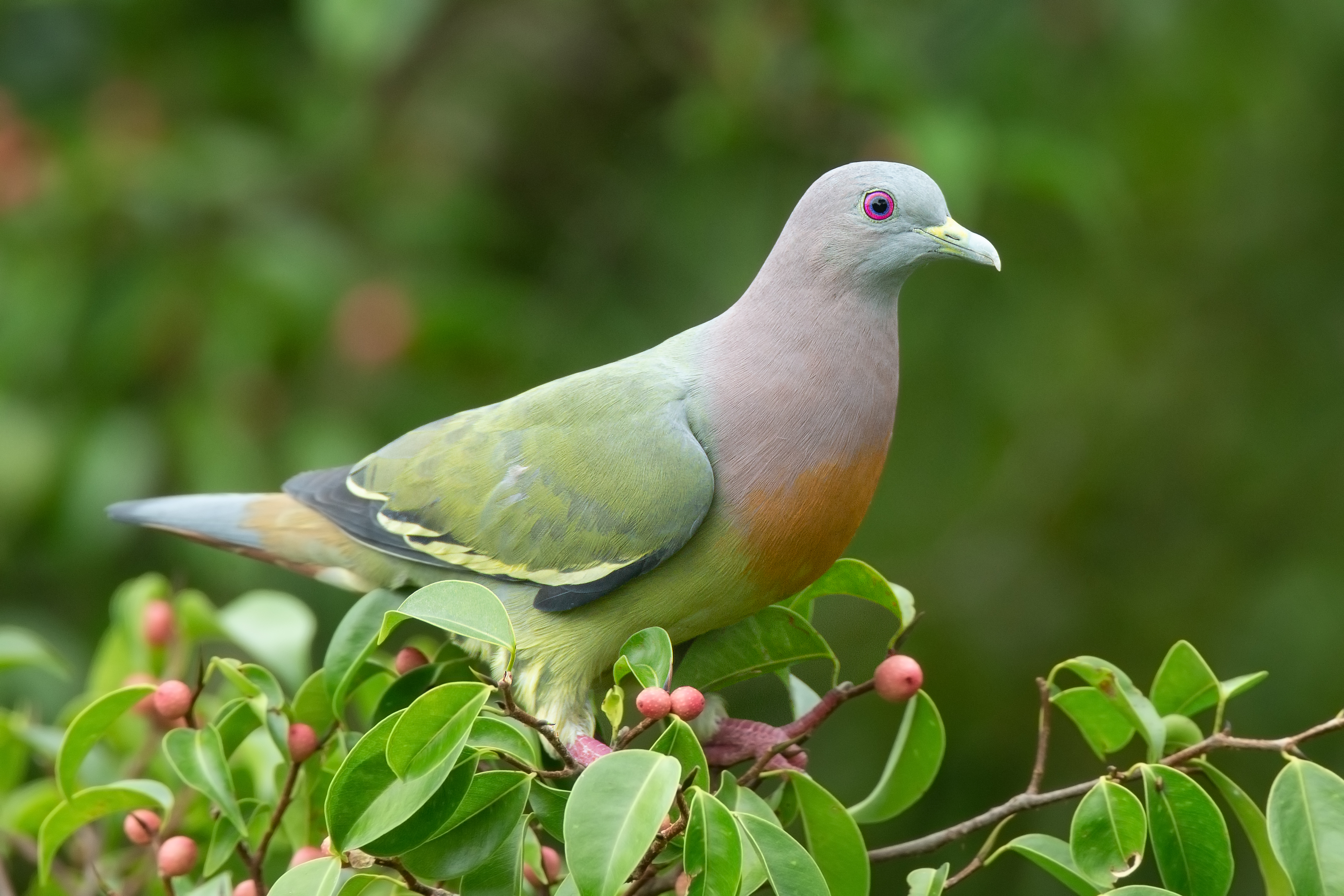
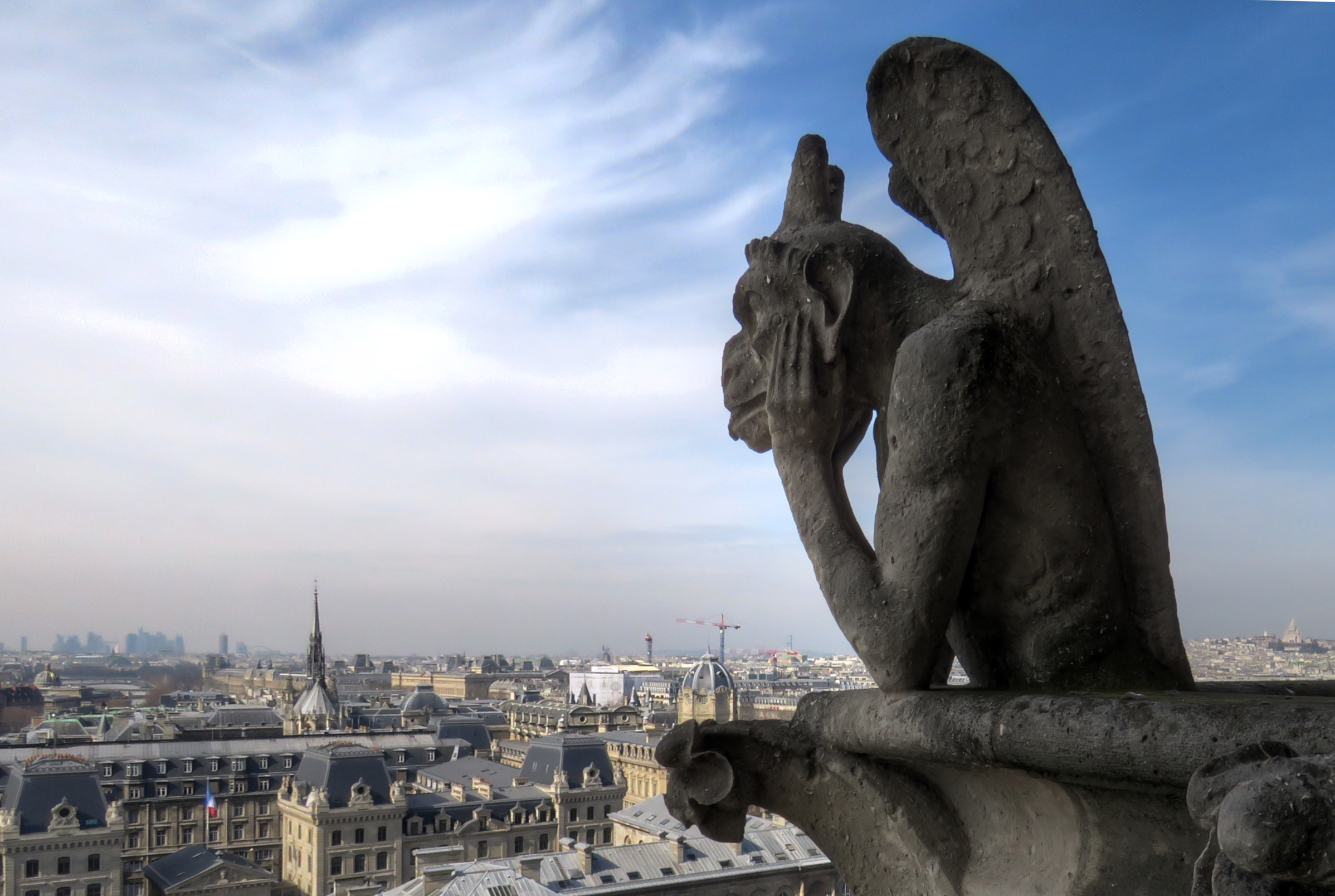
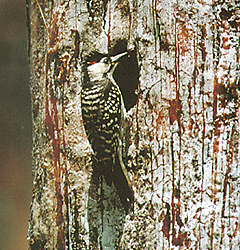
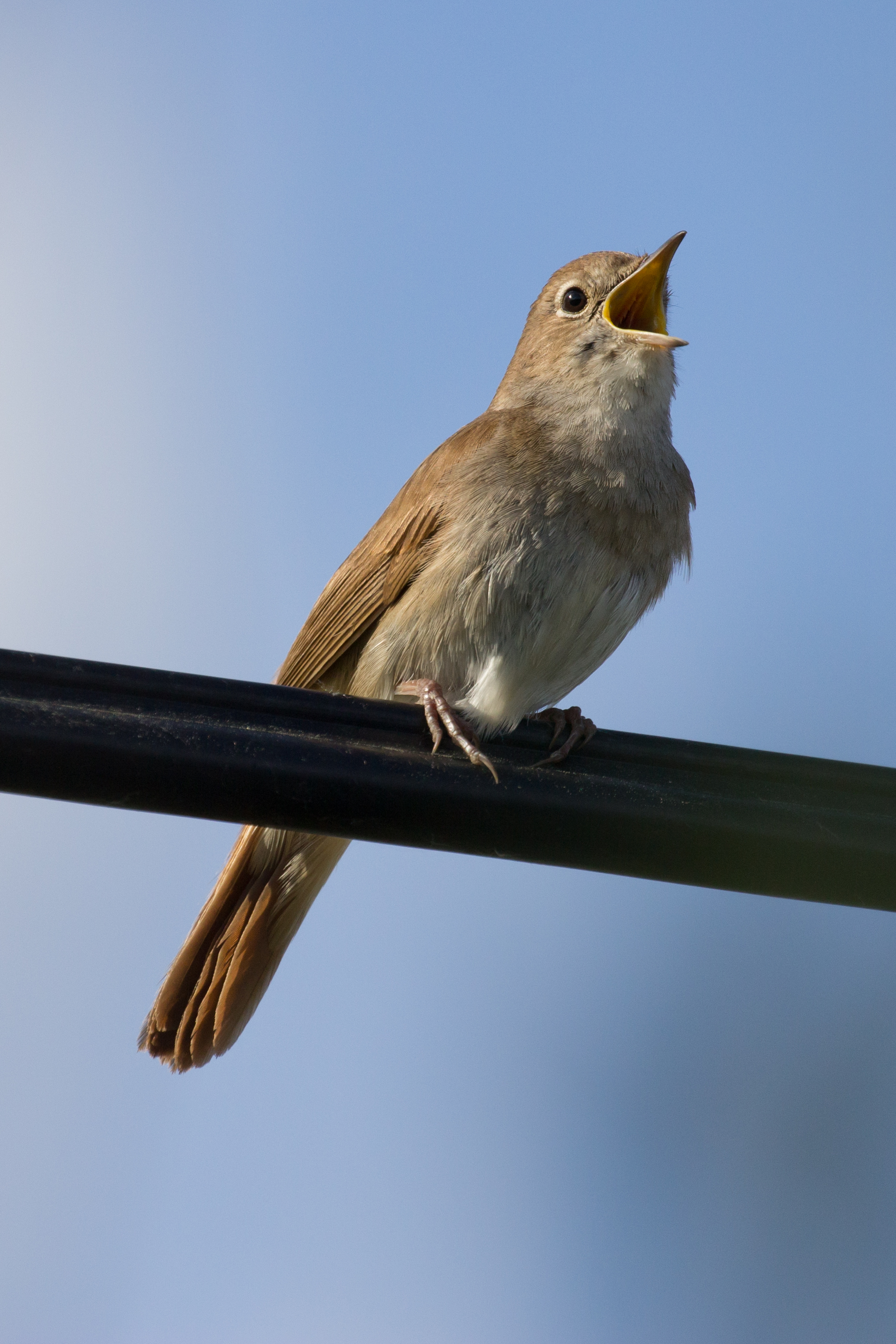
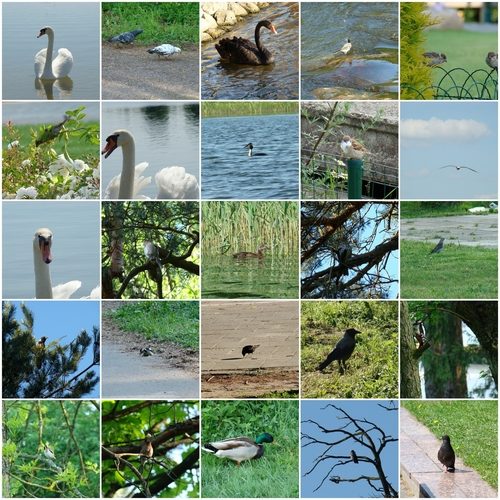
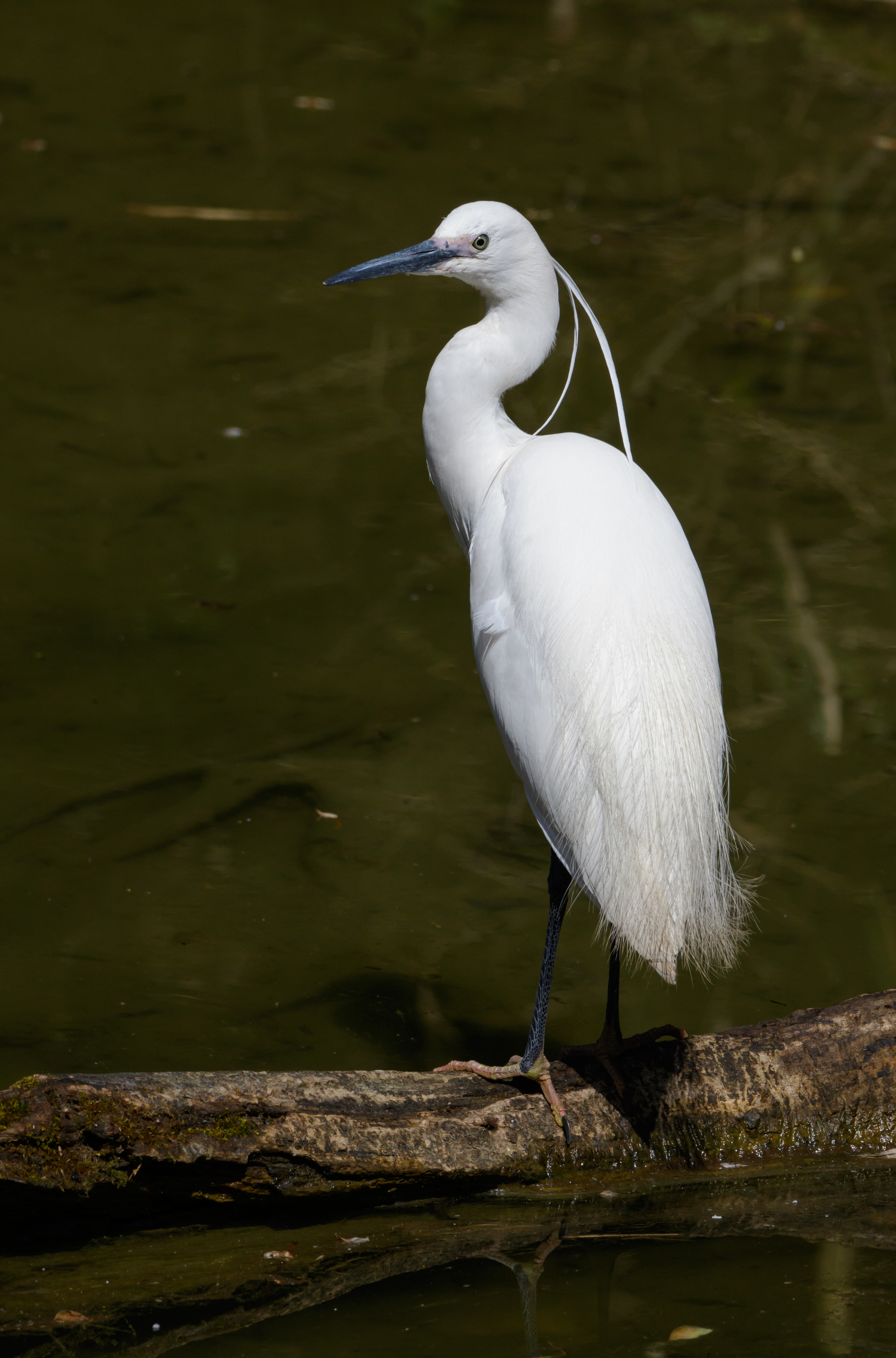
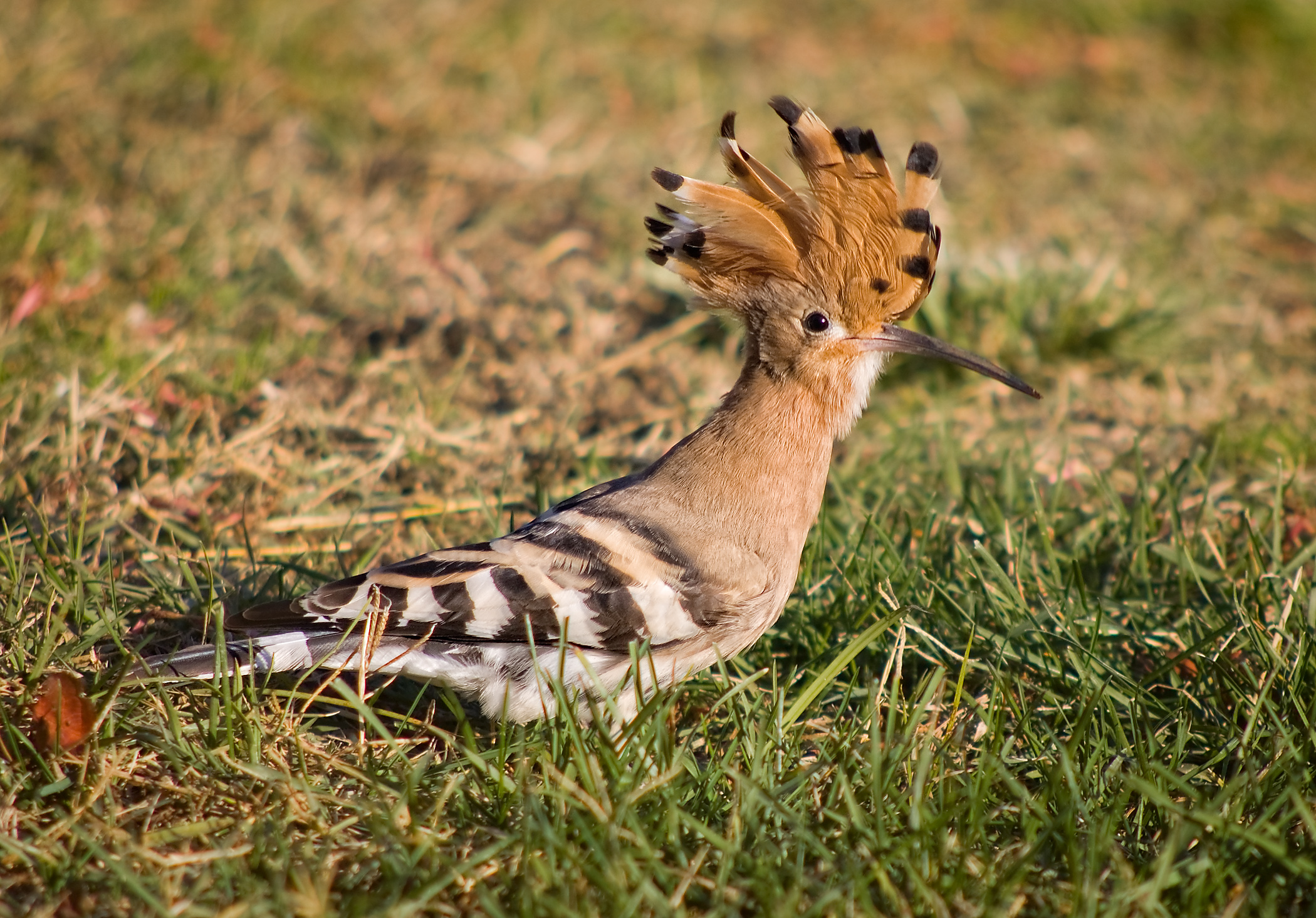
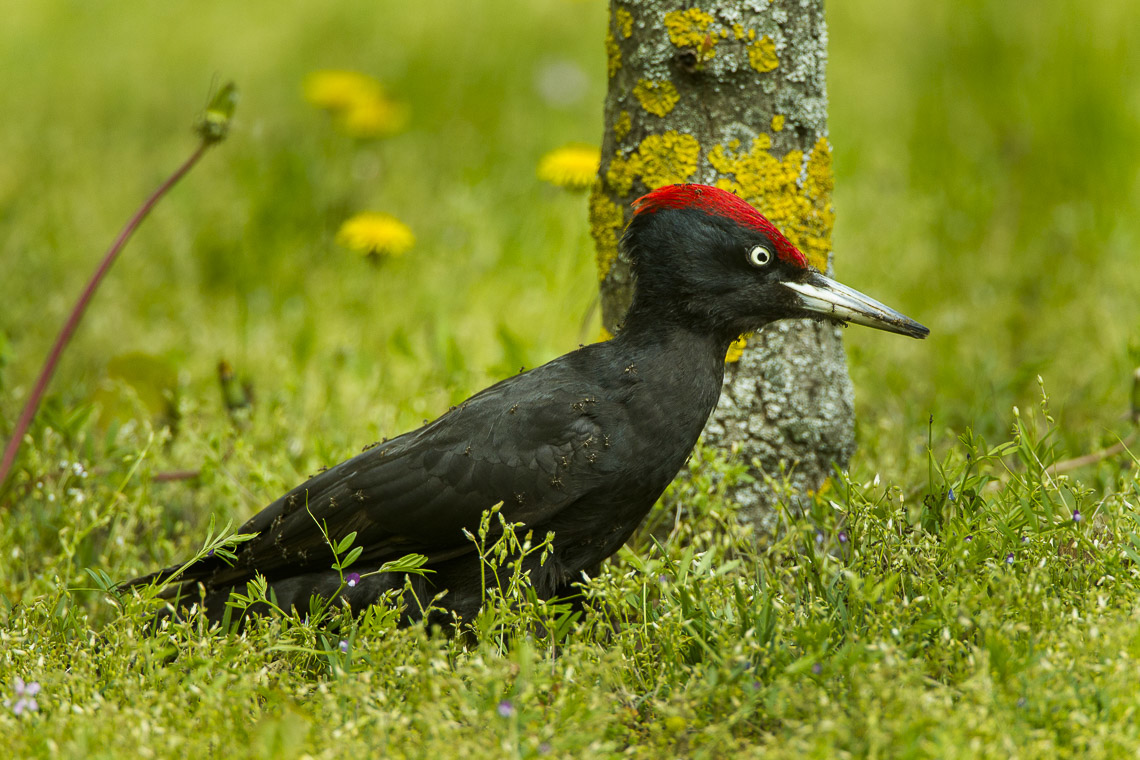
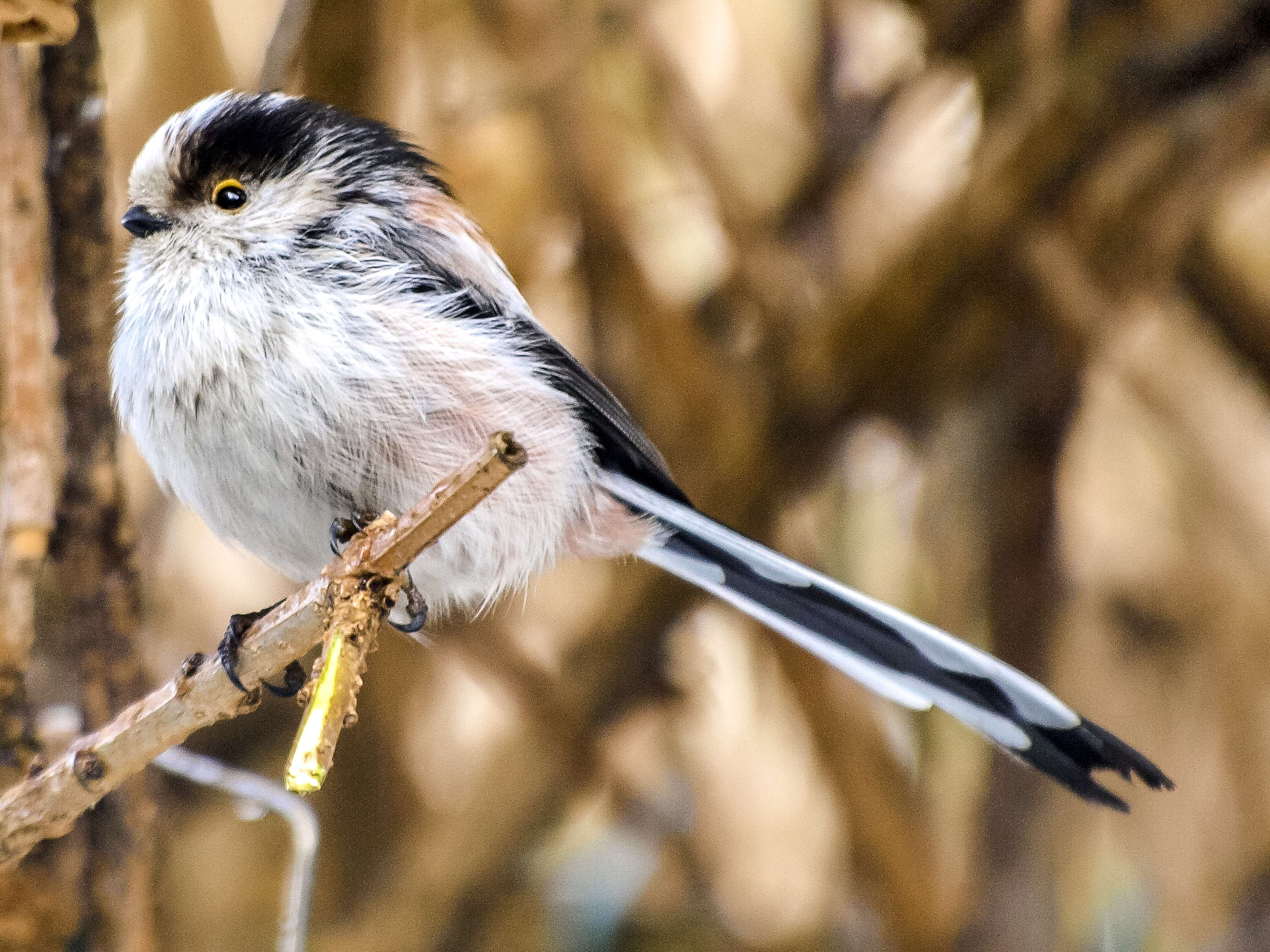
Who?	Into what?	By whom?	Notes	Image
Acanthis	Thistle finch	Apollo and Zeus	Acanthis was the daughter of Autonous and Hippodamia, the sister of Acanthus, Anthus, Erodius and Schoeneus. One day that her brother Anthus led the family's mare outside their usual pasture, they attacked and devoured Anthus. The whole family, in distress, tried but failed to save him. Zeus and Apollo pitied them and changed them all into birds. Acanthis became a thistle finch.
Acanthus	Acanthus (unidentified)	Apollo and Zeus	When disaster struck Autonous and his family, Zeus and Apollo took pity on them and changed them all into birds. Autonous's son Acanthus became an unidentified bird that apparently bore his name in Greek (perhaps a male thistle finch, like his sister Acanthis).
Aëdon ("nightingale")	Nightingale	The gods	Queen Aëdon of Thebes was jealous of her sister-in-law Niobe, who had fourteen children (seven sons and seven daughters) to her own one son. So she devised a plan to kill Niobe's firstborn son Amaleus, but accidentally ended up killing her son Itylus by mistake. In her great grief, she was transformed into a nightingale, who continued to mourn her child in her new life every night. In another version, she had a tale similar to that of Procne, and the killing of her son was deliberate.
Aegolius	Aegolius	Zeus	Aegolius along with three other men attempted to steal honey from the sacred cavern of Zeus in Crete where the god had been born and nursed. Zeus, initially wanting to kill them all, transformed them into birds instead under the advice of Themis and the Moirai.
Aegypius	Vulture	Zeus	Aegypius was in love with a woman named Timandra, but Timandra's son Neophron resented their relationship. One day that Aegypius was visiting Timandra, Neophron in secret switched his mother for Aegypius' own mother Bulis, so the two coupled without realising. All four were turned into birds; Aegypius became a vulture.
Aëtos ("eagle")	Eagle	Hera	Aëtos was an earthborn childhood friend of Zeus, who befriended him while in Crete as he was hiding from his father Cronus. Years later, after Zeus had married Hera, she turned Aëtos into an eagle, as she feared that Zeus had fallen in love with him. The eagle became Zeus's sacred bird and symbol.
Agrius and Oreius	Vulture and eagle owl	Ares and Hermes	Agrius and Oreius, the huge sons Polyphonte had by a bear after Aphrodite cursed her, were two savage cannibals who feasted on human flesh and refused to honour the gods. Zeus sent Hermes to deal with them as he saw fit, and he decided on maiming them with an ax. But he was halted by Ares, who was Polyphonte's own grandfather, so instead the two brothers came into an agreement, and decided to turn everyone inside the house into birds instead. Oreius became an eagle owl, a bird that presages bad omens, while his brother Agrius was changed into a vulture.
Agron	Plover	Hermes	Agron was a member of a Koan family that refused to worship Artemis, Athena and Hermes and openly insulted them. The three of them paid a visit to the family disguised, but they continued to ridicule them, so they changed them all into birds.
Alcander	Wren	Zeus	Alcander was a seer and part of a righteous and favoured-by-the-gods family. When one night robbers set their house ablaze, Zeus saved them by transforming them all into birds. Alcander was changed into a kinglet.
Alcyone ("kingfisher")	Kingfishers (halcyons)	The gods	Alcyone was ordered by her father Sciron to find a suitable groom, but instead she slept with several men. Her father was so enraged with her promiscuity that he threw her into the sea to drown. Alcyone was instead turned into a kingfisher and flew away.
Alcyone and Ceyx (Alcyone means "kingfisher")	Kingfishers (halcyons)	Hera	Alcyone and Ceyx loved each other deeply. While he was travelling via sea, he drowned. Alcyone spent days waiting, only to be informed in a dream of his demise, so she threw herself from a cliff. Pitying her, Hera turned her and Ceyx into kingfishers.
Alcyonides ("halcyons")	Kingfishers (halcyons)	Amphitrite	After their father Alcyoneus was killed by Heracles, his seven daughters known as the Alcyonides ("daughters of Alcyoneus" but also "kingfishers") mourned him deeply and thus they were transformed into halcyon birds by sea-queen Amphitrite.
Alectryon ("rooster")	Rooster	Ares	Aphrodite cheated on her husband Hephaestus with Ares, the god of war, and Ares had a youth, Alectryon, to keep guard. But Alectryon fell asleep, allowing Helios to see them and inform Hephaestus. Ares turned Alectryon into a rooster, which then became Helios' sacred bird, always crowing when he is about to rise during the early hours of the morning.
Aesacus	Diving bird	Tethys	Aesacus, one of the sons of King Priam, fell in love with a nymph, Hesperia, and chased her, but a snake bit her and she died. In great mourning, he threw himself off a cliff, but the water goddess Tethys changed him into a diving bird, allowing him to live in a new form.
Antigone	Stork	Unclear	Antigone was a Trojan girl who claimed to be prettier than Hera, so the goddess gave her snake hair. Later, another god pitied her and changed her into a stork, a bird which feasts on snakes.
Anthus ("flower")	Unidentified	Apollo and Zeus	Autonous' son Anthus once led the family's mare outside their pasture, but they got irritated and attacked him, devouring him. His family could not save him, so Zeus and Apollo took pity in him, and turned him into a bird that bore his name. What exact bird he turned into cannot be determined.
Argus	Peafowl	Hera	After Hera detained Io, now transformed into a cow, from Zeus, she placed her under the careful guard of Argus. Zeus sent Hermes to retrieve Io, who did so by killing Argus. Hera honoured her faithful guardman by transforming him into a peacock (in some versions, she placed his one hundred eyes on the tail of her peacock).
Arne	Jackdaw	The gods	Arne was punished by the gods to become a black-footed, black-winged jackdaw, because she betrayed her homeland when Minos invaded her island, bribed with gold.
Artemiche	Lark	Artemis and Leto	Clinis tried to sacrifice donkeys to Apollo, but Apollo forbade him. Two of his sons disobeyed, so the god drove the donkeys insane, and they attacked the family. Since Clinis, his third son and his daughter Artemiche had been obedient, Leto and Artemis changed them into birds to save them. Artemiche became a lark.
Ascalaphus	Short-eared owl	Persephone or Demeter	After Hades abducted Persephone and kept her in the Underworld, Persephone consumed some pomegranate seeds without anyone's notice. Ascalaphus, a resident of the Underworld, witnessed that, and informed the other gods, forcing Persephone to spend a portion of the year in the Underworld. For this Persephone turned Ascalaphus into a short-eared owl. Alternatively, Demeter pinned Ascalaphus under a heavy rock as punishment. Heracles freed Ascalaphus from the rock when he visited the Underworld, and it was then that Demeter turned him into an owl.
Asteria	Quail	Herself	Asteria is a star goddess, the sister of Leto and the mother of Hecate, who caught the eye of Zeus. She did not wish to consort with him, however, so she fled his advances. Asteria transformed herself into a quail, and flung herself into the sea to avoid Zeus.
Autonous	Stone-curlew	Zeus and Apollo	When disaster struck Autonous and his family, Zeus and Apollo took pity in them and changed them into birds. Autonous became a stone-curlew (oknos in Greek, meaning "slow", because he was slow in saving his son Anthus). The family's unnamed manservant became a heron, although not the same heron as Erodius, another of Autonous's sons, turned into.
Autonous' manservant	Heron	Zeus and Apollo	When disaster struck Autonous and his family, Zeus and Apollo took pity in them and changed them into birds. Autonous became a stone-curlew (oknos in Greek, meaning "slow", because he was slow in saving his son Anthus). The family's unnamed manservant became a heron, although not the same heron as Erodius, another of Autonous's sons, turned into.
Botres	Bee-eater	Apollo	Botres was a Theban man who was unintentionally killed by his father Eumelus when he tasted an animal prepared for sacrifice before the ritual was properly over. Apollo, to whom the family was devoted, took pity in them and metamorphosed the dead Botres into a bee-eater bird.
Bulis	Pounx (heron?)	Zeus	Aegypius was in love with a woman named Timandra, but Timandra's son Neophron resented their relationship. One day that Aegypius was visiting Timandra, Neophron in secret switched his mother for Aegypius' own mother Bulis, so the two coupled without realising. All four were turned into birds; Bulis became a pounx, perhaps a heron.
Byssa	Byssa bird	Artemis (?)	Byssa was a member of a Koan family that refused to worship Artemis, Athena and Hermes and openly insulted them. The three of them paid a visit to the family disguised, but they continued to ridicule them, so the three gods changed them all into birds. Byssa was changed into a byssa bird, an obscure kind of bird.
Caeneus	Yellow bird	Unclear	According to Roman poet Ovid, after his death the invincible hero Caeneus was transformed into some kind of yellow-feathered bird, the only one of its species. Caeneus was notable for having been born a woman and transformed into a man after his request by Poseidon.
Celeus	Woodpecker	Zeus	Celeus and Cerberus along with two other men, Aegolius and Laius, attempted to steal honey from the sacred cavern of Zeus in Crete where the god had been born and nursed in his infancy and childhood. Zeus would have killed them all if not for Themis and the Moirai, who convinced him against spilling blood within the sacred cavern, so instead Zeus turned all four into birds. Celeus became a woodpecker, while Cerberus was turned into a kerberos, a bird that has not been yet identified.
Cerberus	Kerberos (unidentified)	Zeus	Celeus and Cerberus along with two other men, Aegolius and Laius, attempted to steal honey from the sacred cavern of Zeus in Crete where the god had been born and nursed in his infancy and childhood. Zeus would have killed them all if not for Themis and the Moirai, who convinced him against spilling blood within the sacred cavern, so instead Zeus turned all four into birds. Celeus became a woodpecker, while Cerberus was turned into a kerberos, a bird that has not been yet identified.
Ceyx ("gannet")	Gannet	Zeus	In another version of the myth of Alcyone and Ceyx, it is Zeus who changed the couple into birds for daring to compare themselves to Zeus and Hera. Alcyone became a halcyon, and Ceyx a keyx (a gannet bird).
Cinyras's daughters	Kingfishers	The gods	After their father Cinyras, king of Cyprus, challenged the god Apollo in a music contest, lost to him, and was then killed by him as well as punishment, his fifty daughters all mourned him so much that they threw themselves off a cliff and died, and were then transformed into halcyons.
Clinis	Hypaietos	Artemis and Leto	Clinis tried to sacrifice donkeys to Apollo, but Apollo forbade him. Two of his sons disobeyed, so the god drove the donkeys insane, and they attacked the family. Since Clinis, his third son and his daughter had been obedient, Leto and Artemis changed them into birds to save them. Clinis became an unidentified bird called 'hypaetos' ("sub-eagle").
Combe	Crow	Unclear	Combe was transformed into a combe (identified as a crow), apparently to save her from being killed by her children under unknown circumstances.
Corone ("crow")	Crow	Athena	Corone was walking by the seaside when she was wooed in vain by Poseidon; after she repeatedly refused, he chased her down to rape her. Athena, watching he scene, felt sorry for the fellow virgin, and turned Corone into a crow so she would escape the sea-god's amorous advances.
Ctesylla	Dove	Unclear	A Cean woman named Ctesylla died in labour as punishment for her father not keeping his promise to wed her to Hermochares (who eventually became her husband anyway). During her funeral, her body disappeared, and a dove flew away in its place.
Cycnus ("swan")	Swan	Ares	Cycnus was an inlawful, guest-killing son of Ares from Thessaly or Macedonia who once encountered, fought and was killed by Heracles. Ares was also defeated by Heracles when he tried to avenge Cycnus' death, but in some versions the god changed Cycnus into a swan so he could escape from the hero.
Cycnus ("swan") and Thyrie	Swan	Apollo	Cycnus was a beautiful son of Apollo, so vain that only the enamoured Phylius could stand him. Cycnus made him complete a series of impossible tasks to win his favour. Phylius did so, but realised he needed not Cycnus and left him. Cycnus killed himself as did his mother Thyrie out of grief. Apollo transformed them both into swans.
Cycnus ("swan")	Swan	Apollo	Cycnus of Liguria was kin and in some versions a lover of Phaethon. After Phaethon perished when he crushed Helios' chariot, Cycnus was transformed out of sorrow into a swan, known for its mournful song, by Apollo. In one version he lamented Phaethon's death well into is old age, so that his white hair became the white feathers of the bird.
Cycnus ("swan")	Swan	None	Cycnus, the king of Colonae, was a son of Poseidon who courageously fought in the Trojan War at the side of the Trojans, invulnerable to the spears and the swords of the Greeks due to his divine parentage. The hero Achilles managed to kill him by suffocating him. After his death, Cycnus was changed into a white swan.
Daedalion	Hawk	Apollo	After Daedalion's only daughter Chione was killed by Artemis for boasting she was prettier than the goddess, Daedalion jumped off the top of Mount Parnassus. Apollo took pity in him and changed him into a hawk before he could hit the ground.
Diomedes's companions	Birds	Aphrodite	As punishment for wounding her during the Trojan War, Aphrodite made Diomedes's wife cheat on him. As one of his crewmates wondered what worse she could do to them then, she transformed them all into birds that looked like swans (perhaps shearwaters or coots [pictured]). (Their names: Abas, Acmon, Idas, Lycus, Nycteus, Rhexenor.)
Erinoma	Peafowl then again human	Artemis	Aphrodite made both Zeus and Adonis to fall in love with Erinoma, a Cypriot girl who preferred chastity over men. Adonis, after failing to win her affections, entered her bedroom with Aphrodite's help and raped her. Artemis then transformed her into a peahen, but later restored her to her previous human form.
Erodius ("heron")	Heron	Apollo and Zeus	When disaster struck Autonous and his family, Zeus and Apollo took pity in them and changed them into birds. Autonous' son Erodius became a heron, the bird bearing his name.
Eumelus	Raven	Hermes	Eumelus was a member of a Koan family that refused to worship Artemis, Athena and Hermes and openly insulted them. The three of them paid a visit to the family disguised, but they continued to ridicule them, so they changed them all into birds. Eumelus became a night raven.
Gerana ("she-crane")	Crane	Hera	She boasted she was more beautiful than the goddess Hera and thus she was transformed by the angry goddess into a crane. The avian descendants of Gerana waged an eternal war on the Pygmies. In another version, her name is Oenoe.
Harpalyce	Chalcis owl	None	Harpalyce was a princess that was raped by her father Clymenus, and as a result bore him a son. Harpalyce killed that son (or, in other versions, a younger brother) and served him to her unknowing father. When he discovered that, he chased her down, and she prayed to be transformed into a chalcis (a type of bird of prey, perhaps an owl), which she was.
Harpasus ("snatcher")	Harpasus bird	Poseidon	Clinis tried to sacrifice donkeys to Apollo, but Apollo forbade him. His sons Harpasus and Lycius disobeyed, so the god drove the donkeys insane, and they attacked the family. Poseidon took pity in Harpasus and Clinis' wife Harpe and saved them by changing them into unidentified birds of prey.
Harpe ("snatcher")	Harpe bird	Poseidon	Clinis tried to sacrifice donkeys to Apollo, but Apollo forbade him. His sons Harpasus and Lycius disobeyed, so the god drove the donkeys insane, and they attacked the family. Poseidon took pity in Harpasus and Clinis' wife Harpe and saved them by changing them into unidentified birds of prey.
Hierax ("hawk")	Hawk	Poseidon	Hierax was a just man who honoured Demeter greatly. When the tribe began to neglect the worship of Poseidon, he destroyed all of Demeter's crops, so Hierax sent them barley, wheat and food of his own. For this Poseidon changed him into a hawk, a bird as hated by mankind as Hierax had been loved.
Hippodamia	Lark	Apollo and Zeus	Hippodamia was the wife of Autonous and the mother of his sons. After disaster struck their family, she was turned into a lark.
Hyperippe	Loon	Zeus	Hyperippe was part of a righteous and favoured-by-the-gods family. When one night robbers set their house ablaze, Zeus saved them by transforming them all into birds. Hyperippe became a diver because she jumped into water to escape the fire.
Ictinus ("kite")	Kite	Unclear	Ictinus wished to force himself on his daughter Side, so he chased her down. She took her own life on her dead mother's grave, and transformed into a tree. Ictinus transformed too, and became a bird bearing his name, who never rested on Side's tree.
Ino's companions	Shearwaters ?	Hera	Hera drove Queen Ino and King Athamas mad for fostering the young Dionysus, the son of Zeus and Semele, Ino's sister. King and queen took to the countryside with their young children whom they killed. After her disappearance, Ino's companions began to revile Hera, so she transformed them into birds, perhaps aithuiai (shearwaters?).
Itys	Pheasant	The gods	In some versions of the tale, after Procne killed her son Itys and fed him to his father in order to avenge her husband Tereus' horrid treatment and rape of her sister Philomela, Itys was transformed into a bird like the rest of his family, and became a pheasant. In most versions however Itys stays dead and eaten.
Iynx	Jynx	Hera	Iynx was a nymph who put a spell on Zeus than made him fall in love with the Argive princess Io. Angered, Hera turned Iynx into a bird bearing her name. Iynx was thought to be the inventor of the iynx love-charms; spinning wheels with an iynx bird attached to them.
Laius	Blue rock thrush	Zeus	Laius along with three other men attempted to steal honey from the sacred cavern of Zeus in Crete where the god had been born and nursed. Zeus, initially wanting to kill them all, transformed them into birds instead under the advice of Themis and the Moirai.
Lelante	Woodpecker	Zeus	Lelante was part of a righteous and favoured-by-the-gods family. When one night robbers set their house ablaze, Zeus saved the family by transforming them all into birds. Lelante became a green woodpecker.
Lycius	Raven	Apollo	Lycius was one of Clinis's children. He and his brother Harpasus tried to sacrifice donkeys to Apollo against the god's will, so when they did so the donkeys went mad and began to devour them. Lycius's life was spared, and he was changed into a white-feathered raven by Apollo himself.
Megaletor	Ichneumon (unidentified)	Zeus	Megaletor was part of a righteous and favoured-by-the-gods family. When one night robbers set their house ablaze, Zeus saved the family by transforming them all into birds. Megaletor became an 'ichneumon', an unidentified bird.
Meleagrids	Guineafowl	Artemis	The Meleagrids, that is the sisters of Meleager, mourned their brother's passing so much that Artemis eventually turned them all into guineafowl.
Memnon's companions	Memnonides	The gods	After the death of Memnon at the hands of Achilles during the Trojan War, his Aethiopian companions buried him and stood guard by his tomb, eventually transforming into memnonides birds.
Meropis	Owl	Athena	Meropis was a member of a Koan family that refused to worship Artemis, Athena and Hermes and openly insulted them. The three of them paid a visit to the family disguised, but they continued to ridicule them, so they changed them all into birds. Meropis was changed into an owl by Athena.
Merops	Eagle	Hera	After Artemis shot his wife Ethemea and Persephone snatched her alive into the underworld, Merops tried to kill himself out of grief. Hera took pity in him, and changed him into an eagle, and then placed him among the stars (the constellation Aquila).
Minyades	Owl and eagle owl	Dionysus	The three daughters of Minyas rejected the worship of Dionysus and criticized the women who chose to be his Maenads/Bacchae. Dionysus visited them himself and terrified them. In the end, he turned one sister into a bat, another into an owl, the third into an eagle owl. In another version all three became bats.
Munichus	Buzzard	Zeus	Munichus was the father of a righteous and favoured-by-the-gods family. When one night robbers set their house ablaze, Zeus saved them by transforming them all into birds. Munichus was metamorphosed into a buzzard.
Neophron	Vulture	Zeus	Aegypius was in love with a woman named Timandra, but Timandra's son Neophron resented their relationship. One day that Aegypius was visiting Timandra, Neophron in secret switched his mother for Aegypius' own mother Bulis, so the two coupled without realising. All four were turned into birds; Neophron became an aegypius vulture.
Nisus	Sea eagle	The gods	Nisus was a king of Megara. When Minos, the king of Crete, invaded his kingdom, Nisus' daughter Scylla betrayed her homeland as she had fallen in love with Nisus, resulting in his death. Post-mortum Nisus was transformed into a sea eagle
Nyctaea ("nocturnal")	Owl	Athena	Nyctaea was a princess who either tricked her unwitting father into sleeping with her or fled her home after her father (or a houseguest) tried to rape her. In either case she was transformed into a nocturnal owl by Athena.
Nyctimene ("nocturnal")	Owl	Athena	Nyctimene was a mortal princess that was raped by her father, and out of shame she fled to the woods, where she hid her face from the world. Athena turned her into an owl, a bird that hides during the day, but appears at night.
Oenotropae ("wine-turning")	Doves	Dionysus	The Oenotropae were sisters who had been blessed by Dionysus with the power to change water into wine, grass into wheat, and berries into olives. When the Greeks set off to conquer Troy, Agamemnon, finding their skill useful, abducted them, but they escaped and Dionysus turned them all into white doves in order to save them.
Ortygius ("quail")	Billy tit	Artemis and Leto	Clinis tried to sacrifice donkeys to Apollo, but Apollo forbade him. Two of his sons disobeyed, so the god drove the donkeys insane, and they attacked the family. Since Clinis, his third son Ortygius and his daughter Artemiche had been obedient, Leto and Artemis changed them into birds to save them. Ortygius became a billy-tit.
Pandareus	Sea eagle	Zeus	In one variation of the myth of Procne, Philomela and Tereus (here called Aëdon, Chelidon and Polytechnus instead) after Aëdon and Chelidon killed Itys and served him to his father for revenge over Polytechnus raping Chelidon, they ran back to
Pandareus's son	Hoopoe	Zeus	Pandareus, while Polytechnus hunted them down. Pandareus's servants seized Polytechnus, and for his crimes against the two sisters he was tied in bonds, smeared with honey all over his body, and left to the mercy of flies. Aëdon pitied him still, so she tried to keep the flies off of him. Pandareus,
Pandareus's wife	Halcyon	Zeus	his wife and his son grew angry with her and attacked her, thereupon Zeus interfered. Not wanting any more bloodshed, he turned everyone involved into a bird; Pandareus a sea eagle, his wife a kingfisher, his son a hoopoe.
Pelia	Dove	Aphrodite	After Adonis' death, his childhood friend Melos was so heartbroken he killed himself via hanging. His wife Pelia, who was cousin to Adonis, could not bear the loss of them both so she took her life in the same way Melos had. Aphrodite transformed her into a dove.
Perdix ("partridge")	Partridge	Athena	Perdix, the nephew of Daedalus, was an apprentice to his uncle and an even more brilliant craftsman than he was. Daedalus, being unable to bear not being the greatest inventor in the land, pushed Perdix off a high tower, killing him. Athena then transformed the dead Perdix into a partridge.
Periphas	Eagle	Zeus	Periphas was a pious and respected king of Attica. He was so beloved that people started worshipping him as Zeus. That displeased Zeus, who meant to kill him, but because Periphas was so pious, Apollo convinced Zeus to turn Periphas into an eagle instead. Zeus visited Periphas and his wife in their house, and transformed him into an eagle.
Peristera ("dove")	Dove	Eros	Once Aphrodite and her son Eros held a flower-gathering competition. Eros was in the lead until a nymph named Peristera arrived and helped Aphrodite gather more flowers than he had, therefore giving Aphrodite the victory. In anger, Eros transformed Peristera into the homonymous bird, a symbol of Aphrodite.
Phene ("vulture")	Lammergeier	Zeus	Phene, Periphas's wife, begged Zeus to let her stay with Periphas for all time and transform her as well after he had been changed into an eagle bird. Zeus honoured her wish and transformed her into a bearded vulture. That bird became a good omen for people, per Zeus's will.
Philaeus	Dog bird (unidentified)	Zeus	Philaeus was part of a righteous and favoured-by-the-gods family. When one night robbers set their house ablaze, Zeus saved the family by transforming them all into birds. Philaeus was changed into a 'dog', an unidentified bird.
Philomela/Chelidon ("swallow")	Swallow	The gods	The Athenian princess Philomela had a sister named Procne, who was married to Tereus, who was a king of Thrace. As Philomela was visiting her sisters, Tereus raped her and cut off her tongue so she could not reveal to anyone what had happened. Philomela then waved a tapestry, and managed to show it to her sister. Procne then killed Itys, her son by Tereus, and fed him to his father. When Tereus discovered he had eaten his son's flesh, hunted down the two sisters. Then the gods turned all three into birds; Philomela was turned into a swallow. In a very similar tale only differing in details, the princess is called Chelidon. Roman authors tended to swap the birds the sisters turned into.
Picus ("woodpecker")	Woodpecker	Circe	Picus was a Latian king very much in love with his wife, the nymph Canens. Circe fell in love with him and tried to woo him; but he rejected her, preferring to stay faithful to Canens. Circe, in her fury, turned Picus into a woodpecker to punish him.
Pierides	Magpies	Muses	The Pierides were nine Macedonian sisters with great talent in music and song, so they challenged the Muses themselves into a music contest. Naturally they lost against the very goddesses of dance, music and song, so the Muses turned them all into magpies as punishment.
Pleiades	Doves	Zeus	When the hunter Orion began to relentlessly pursue the Pleiades nymphs, Zeus turned them initially into doves in order to save them, and eventually into stars.
Polyphonte	Strix	Ares and Hermes	Polyphonte, who was made by Aphrodite to mate with a bear, had two exceedingly unlawful sons, Agrius and Oreius. Hermes was sent to kill or maim the family, but was halted by Ares, who was Polyphonte's grandfather. The two gods agreed to turn them all into birds instead. Polyphonte became a strix, an ancient ill omen and harbinger of war and civil strife to men.
Polyphonte's maid	Woodpecker	Ares and Hermes	As Ares and Hermes decided to turn all of Polyphonte's household into birds, the female servant asked the gods to turn her into a good omen for mankind, so Ares and Hermes chose the woodpecker for her.
Procne/Aëdon ("nightingale")	Nightingale	The gods	The Athenian princess Procne was married to Tereus, who was a king of Thrace. Tereus raped Procne's sister Philomela and cut off her tongue so she could not reveal to anyone what had happened. Philomela then waved a tapestry, and managed to show it to her sister. Procne then killed Itys, her son by Tereus, and fed him to his father. When Tereus discovered he had eaten his son's flesh, hunted down the two sisters. Then the gods turned all three into birds; Procne was changed into a nightingale. In a very similar tale only differing in details, the queen is called Aëdon. Roman authors tended to swap the birds the sisters turned into.
Schoeneus	Unidentified	Apollo and Zeus	When disaster struck Autonous and his family, Zeus and Apollo took pity in them and changed them into birds. The bird Schoeneus has not been identified.
Scylla	Egret	Unclear	The young Scylla fell in love with the Cretan king Minos, who invaded the kingdom of Scylla's father Nisus. Scylla betrayed her father for Minos, leading to his death. Scylla was punished by being transformed into a ciris sea bird, forever pursued by the sea-eagle, the bird her father turned into.
Tereus/Polytechnus	Hoopoe	The gods (Zeus)	The Athenian princess Procne was married to Tereus, who was a king of Thrace. Tereus raped Procne's sister Philomela and cut off her tongue so she could not reveal to anyone what had happened. Philomela then waved a tapestry, and managed to show it to her sister. Procne then killed Itys, her son by Tereus, and fed him to his father. When Tereus discovered he had eaten his son's flesh, hunted down the two sisters. Then the gods turned all three into birds; Tereus became a hoopoe. In a very similar tale only differing in details, the king is called Polytechnus and is changed into a pelican or woodpecker.
Tereus/Polytechnus	Woodpecker ?	The gods (Zeus)
Timandra	Aegithalos	Zeus	Aegypius was in love with a woman named Timandra, but Timandra's son Neophron resented their relationship. One day that Aegypius was visiting Timandra, Neophron in secret switched his mother for Aegypius' own mother Bulis, so the two coupled without realising. All four were turned into birds; Timandra became an aegithalos tit.

=== Metamorphoses into landscape ===
Metamorphoses into landscape
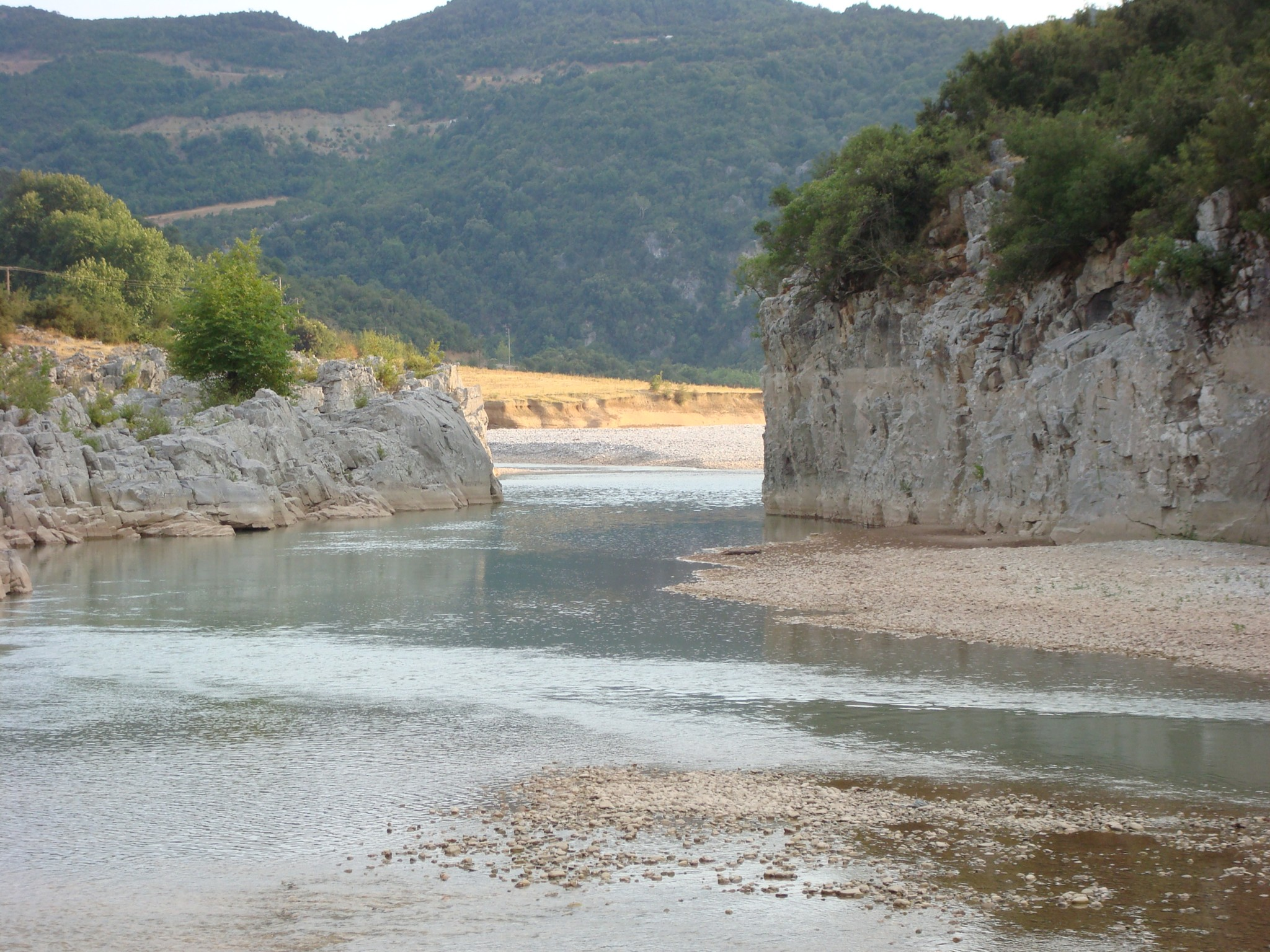
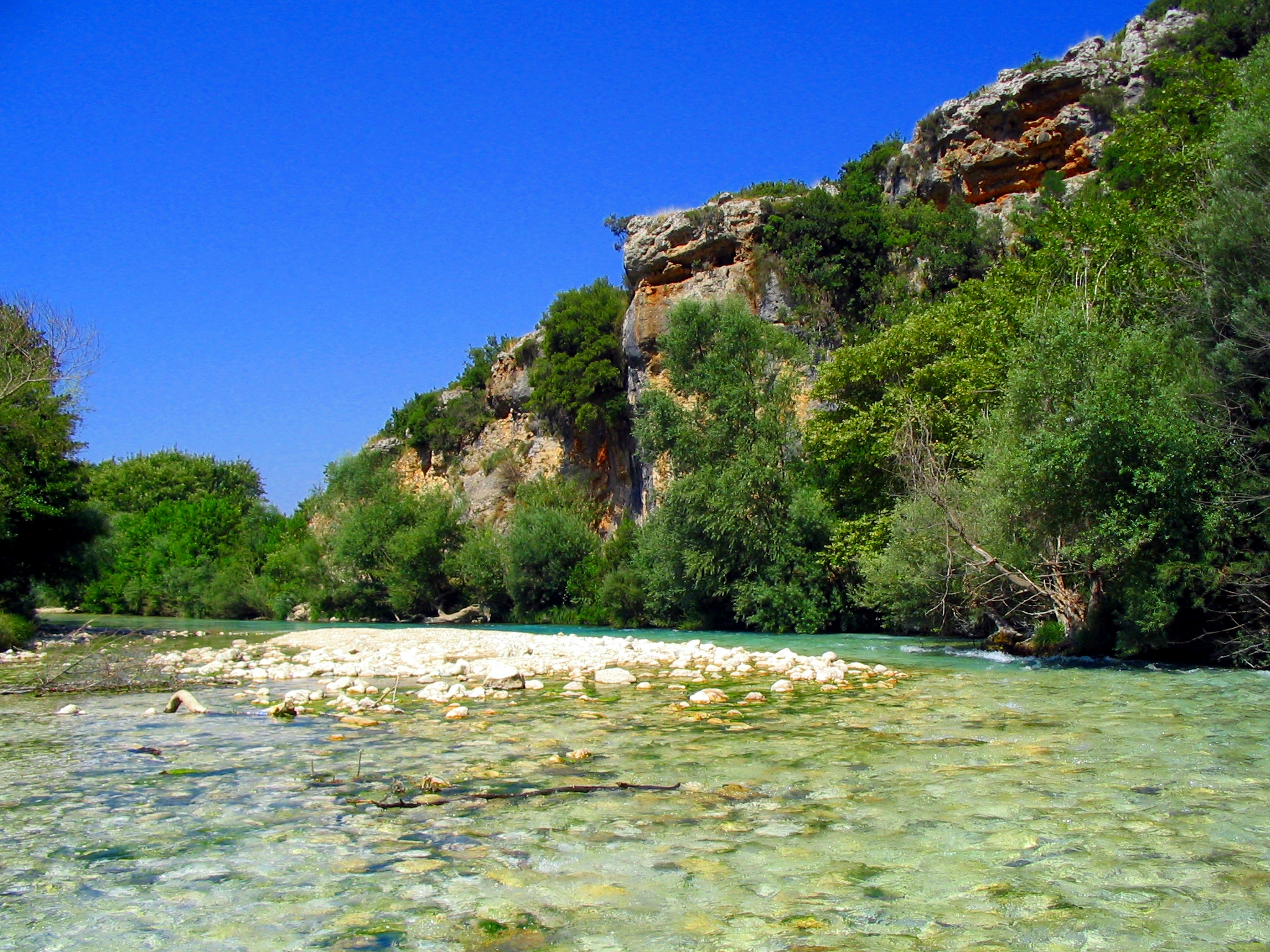
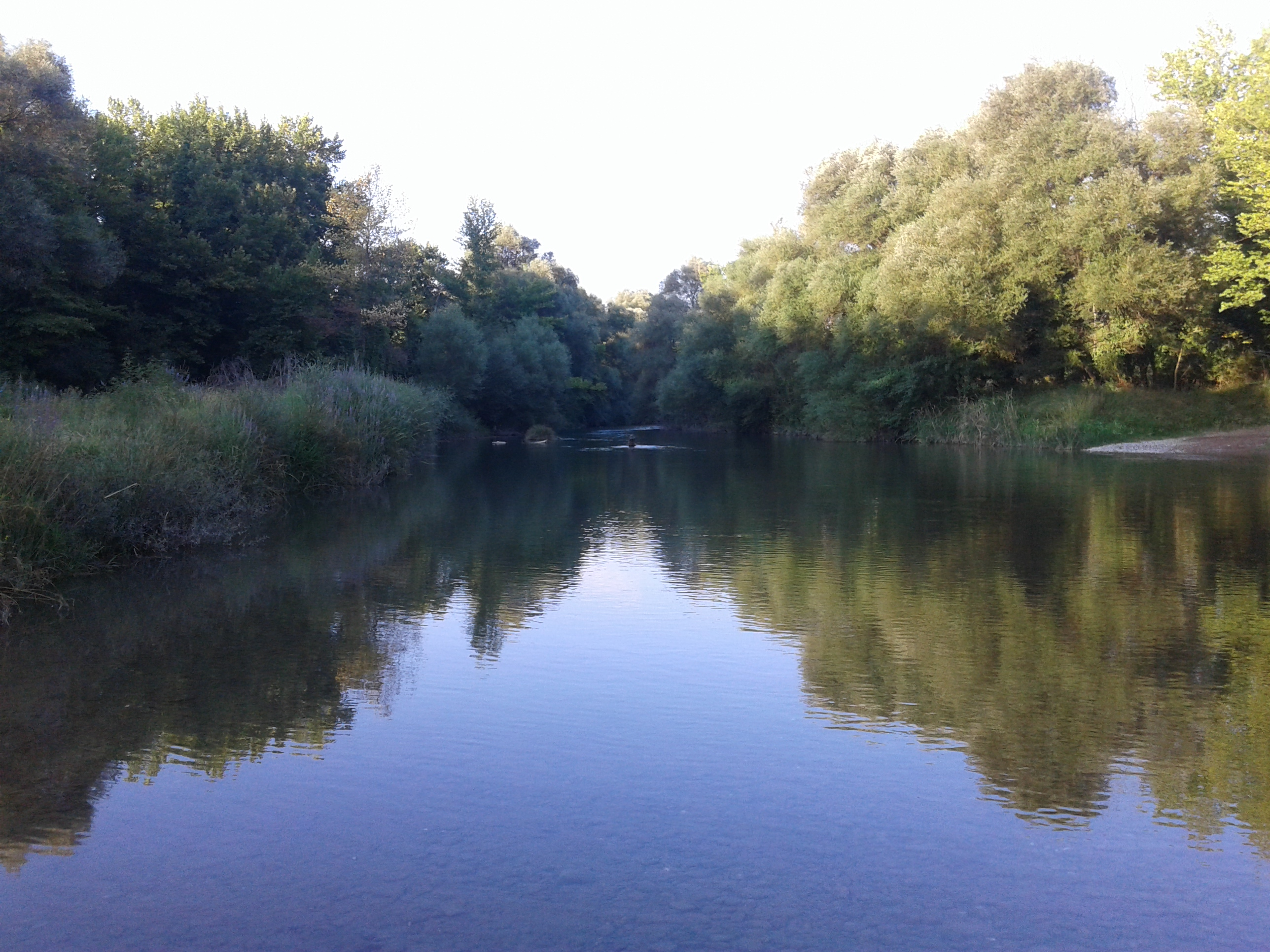
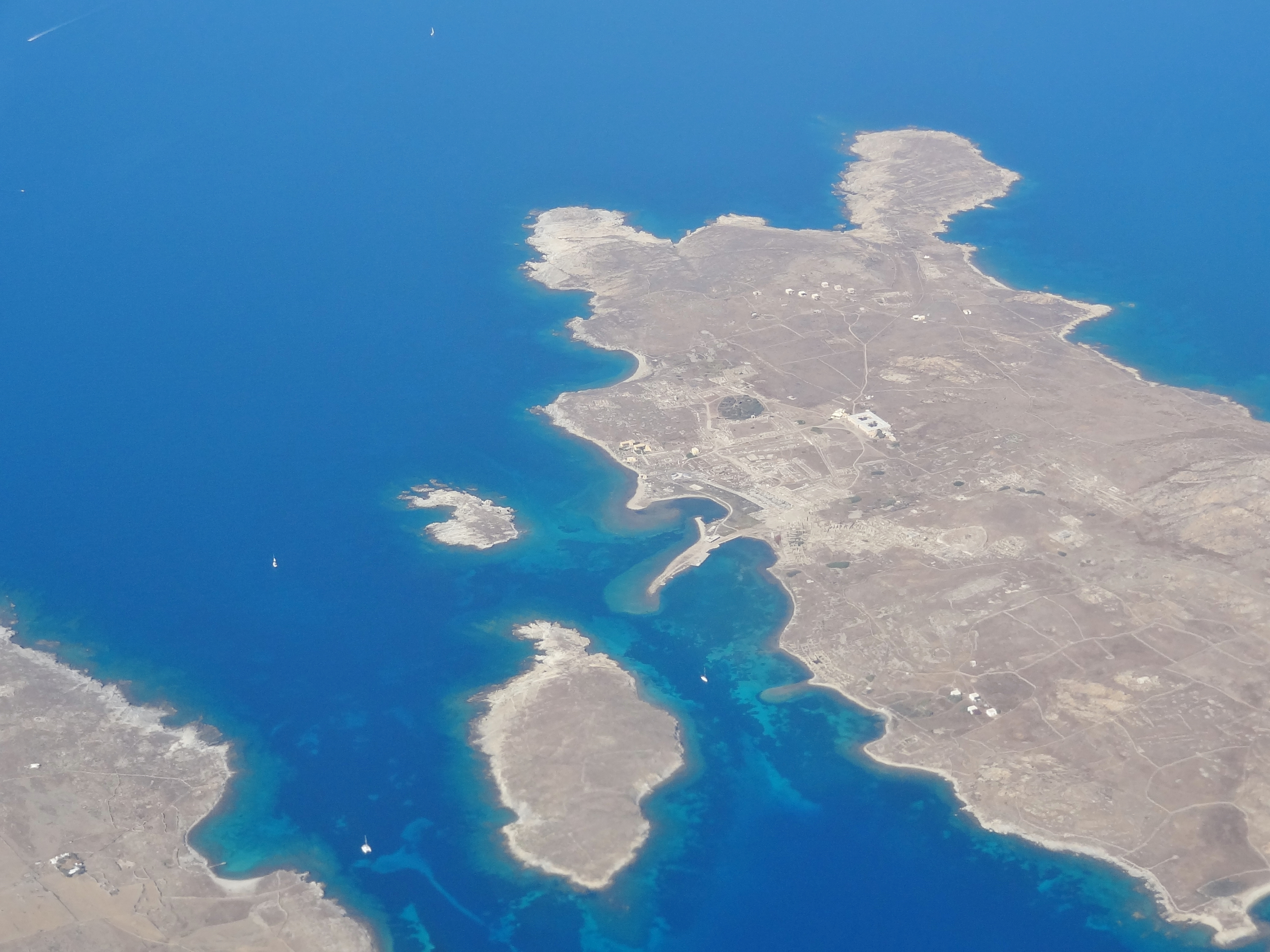
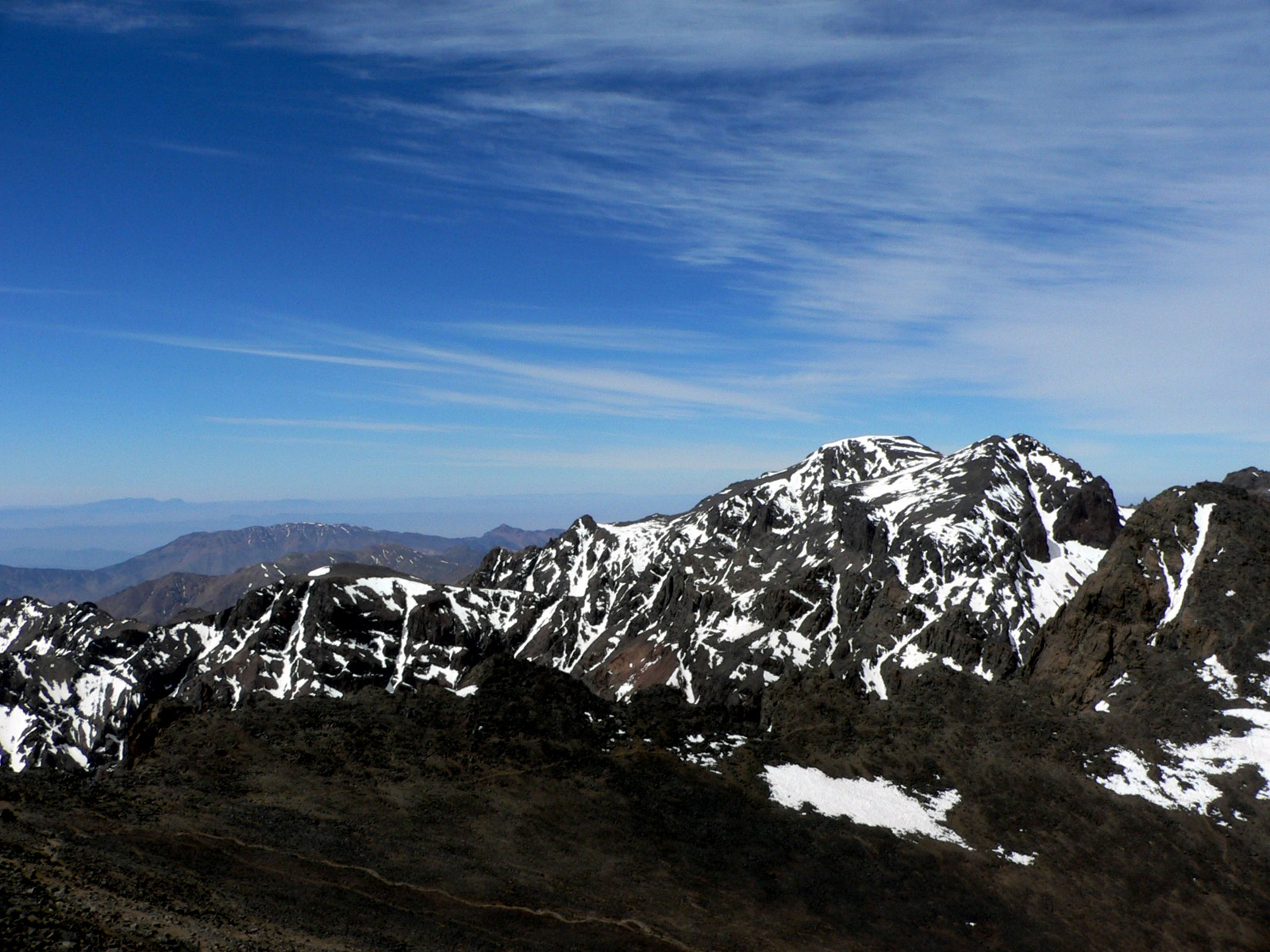
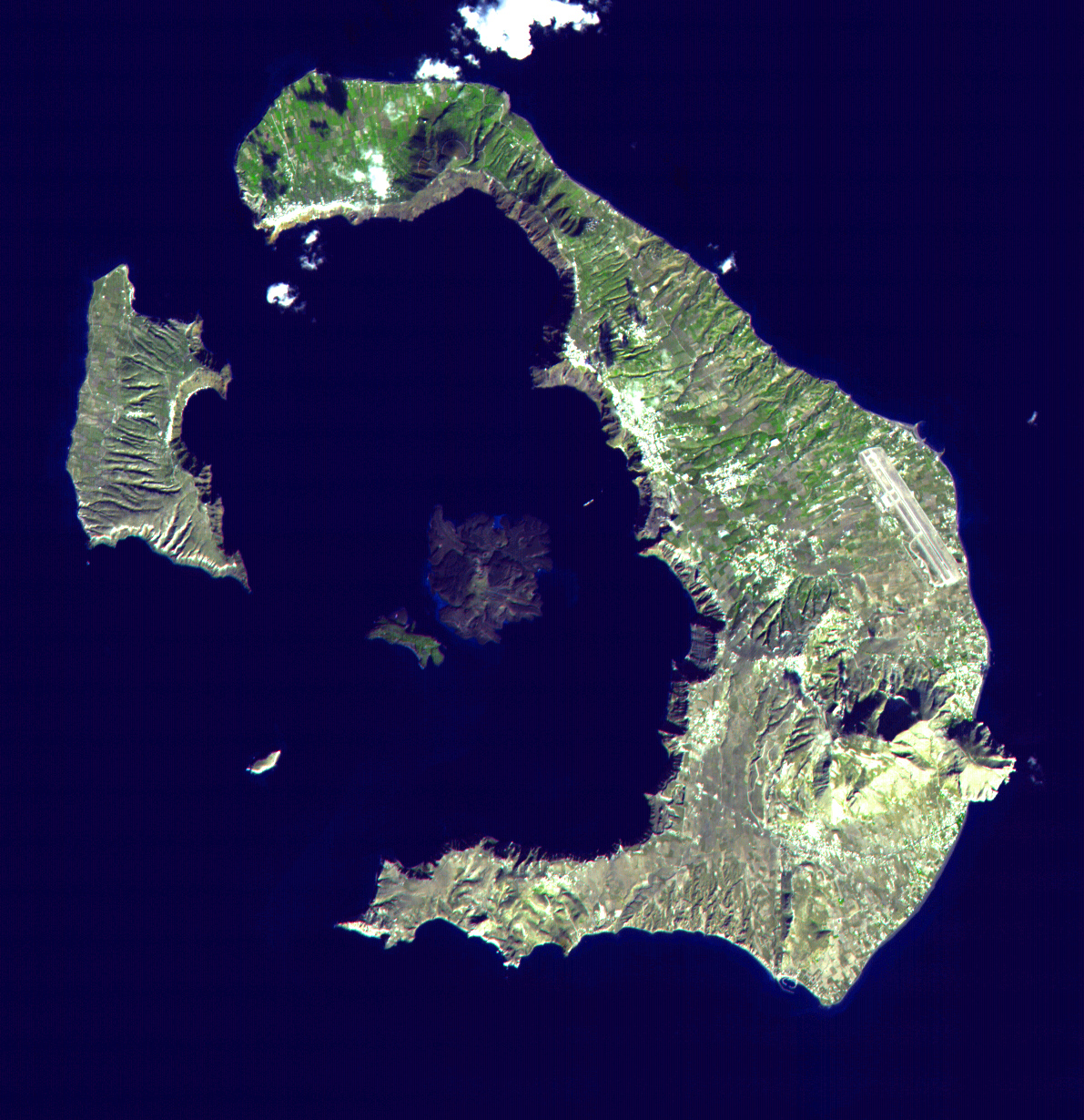
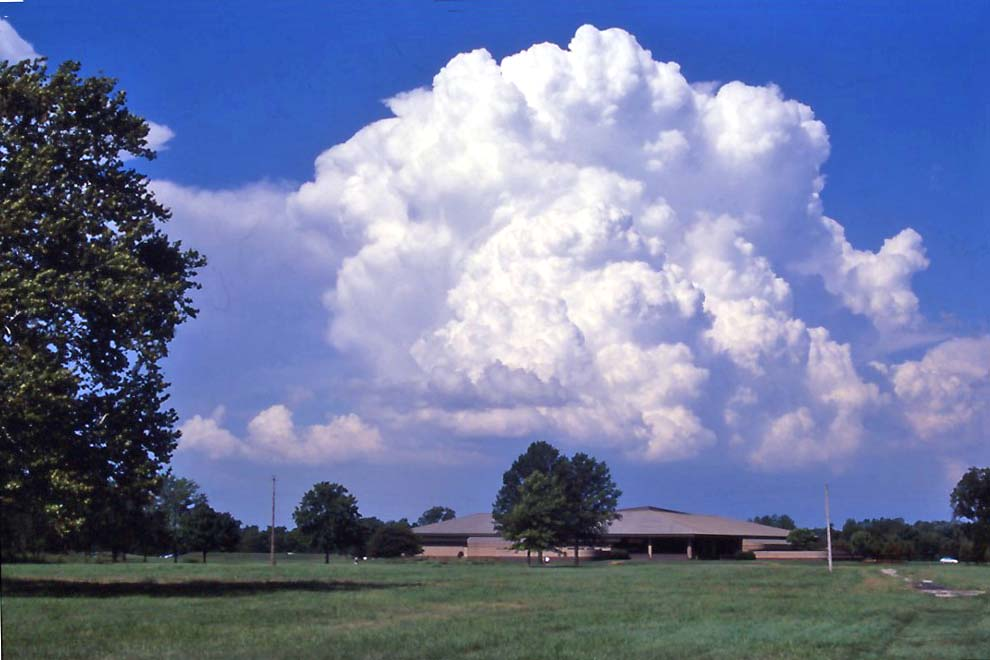
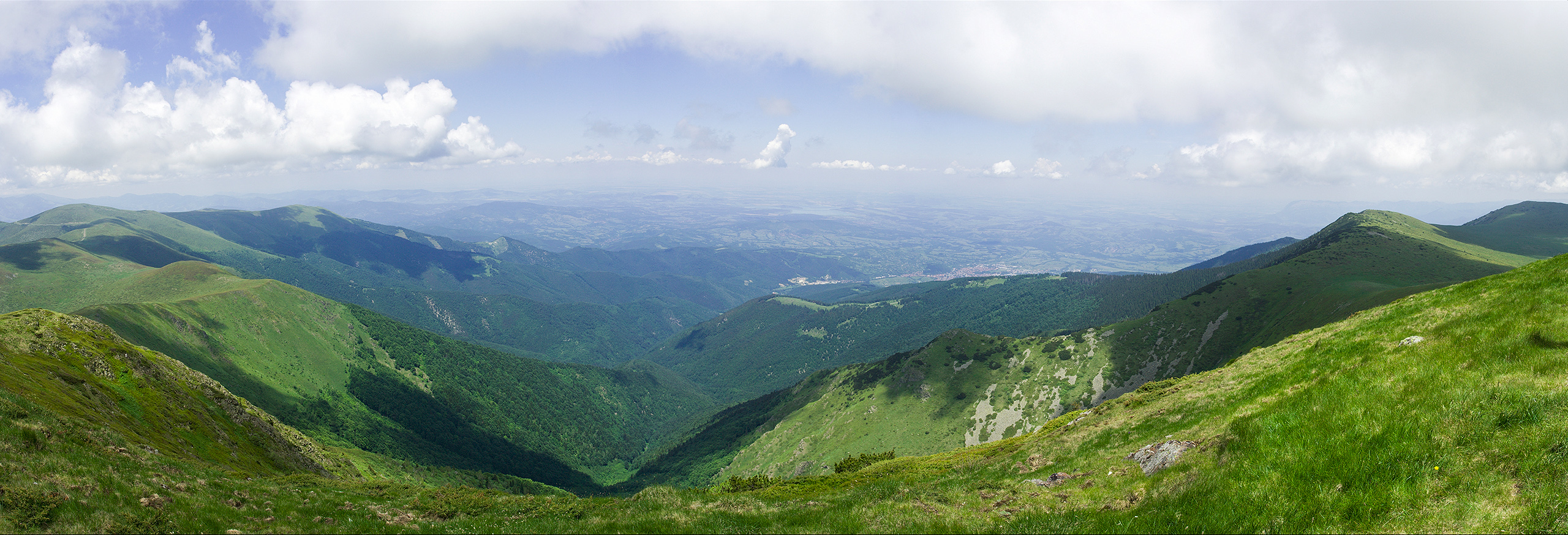
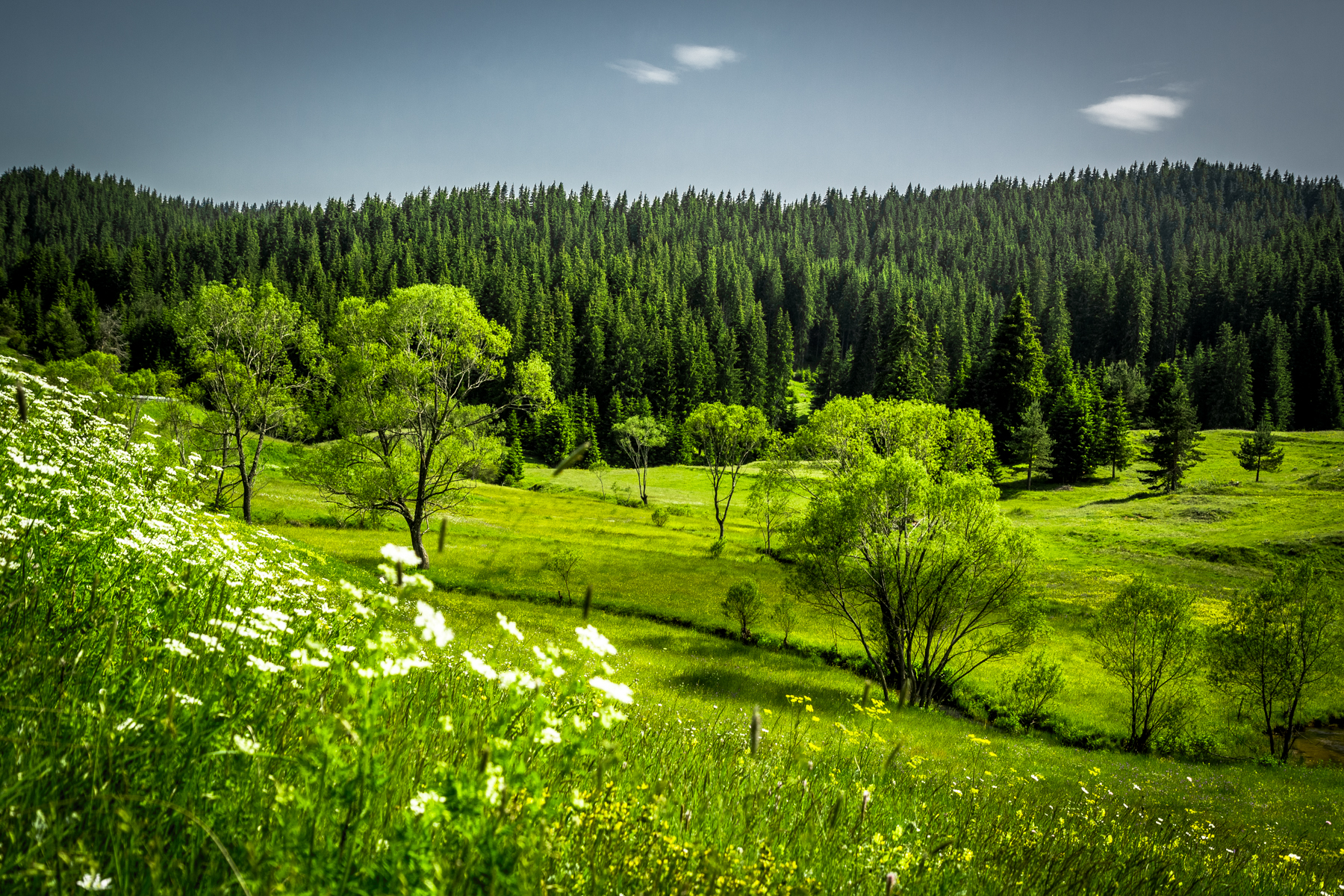
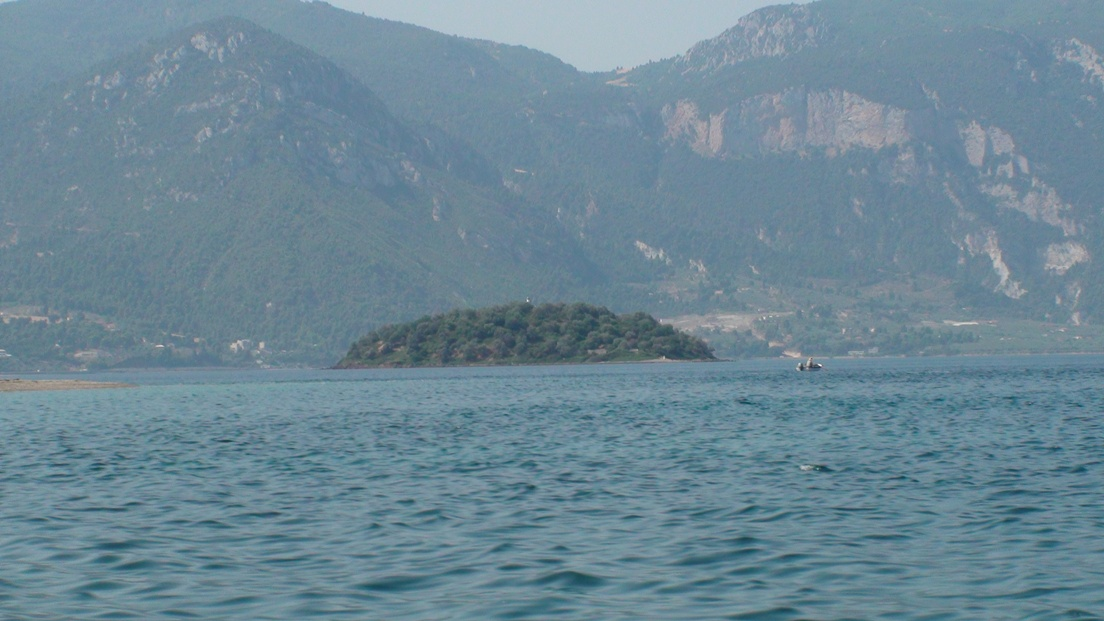
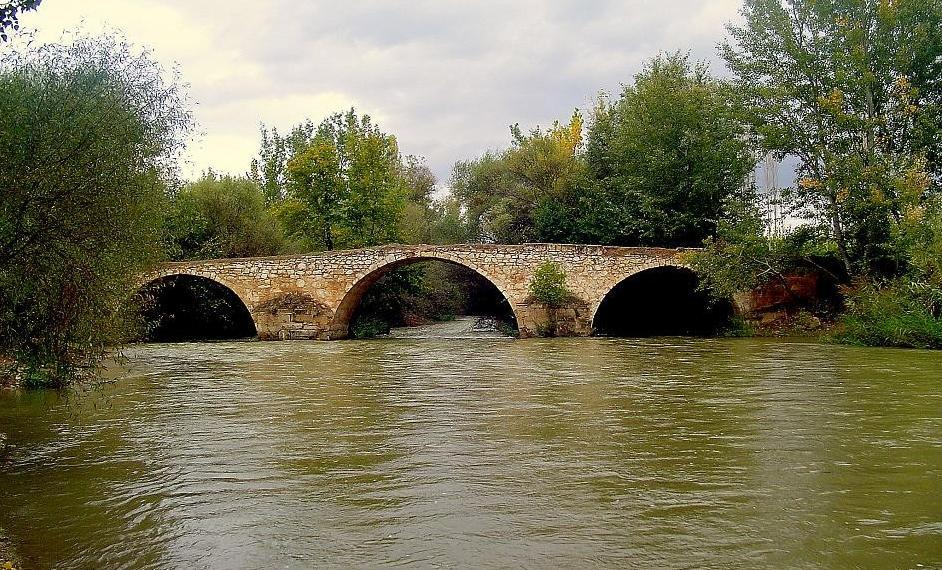
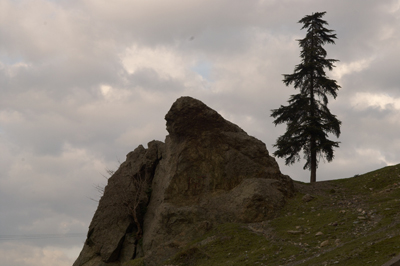
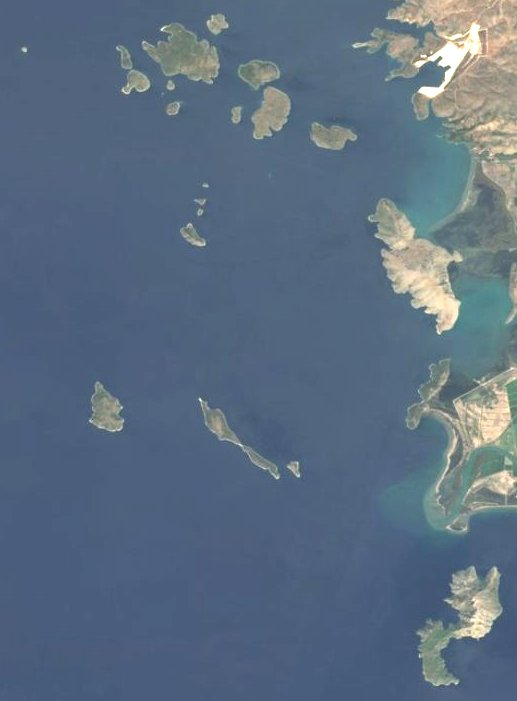
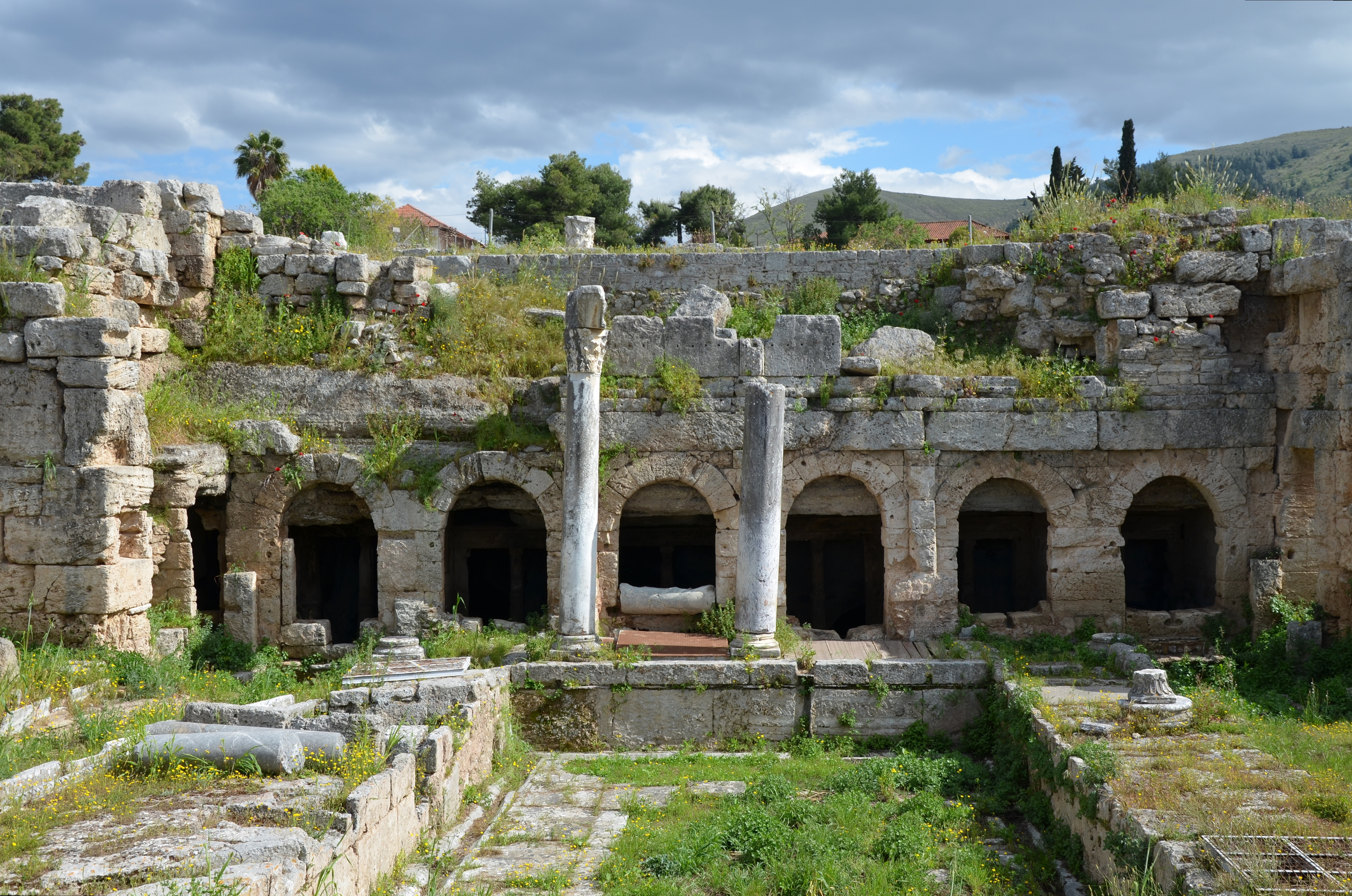
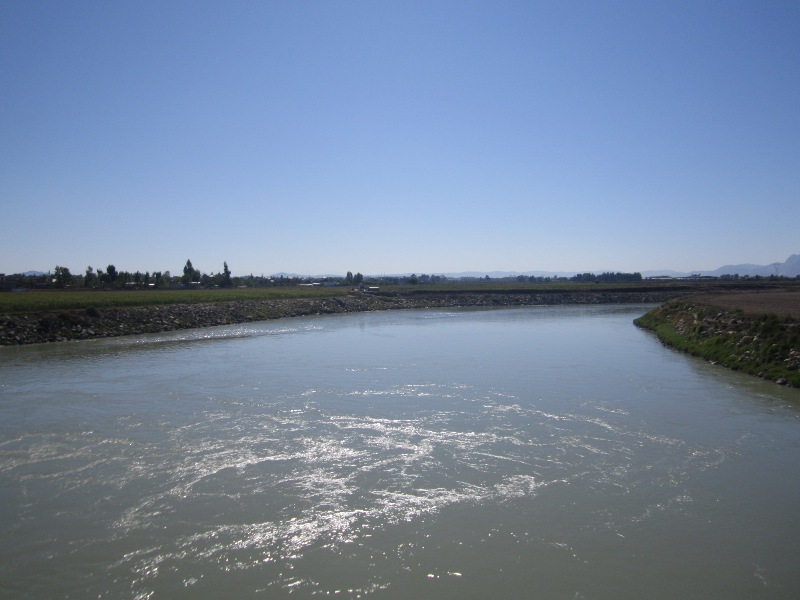
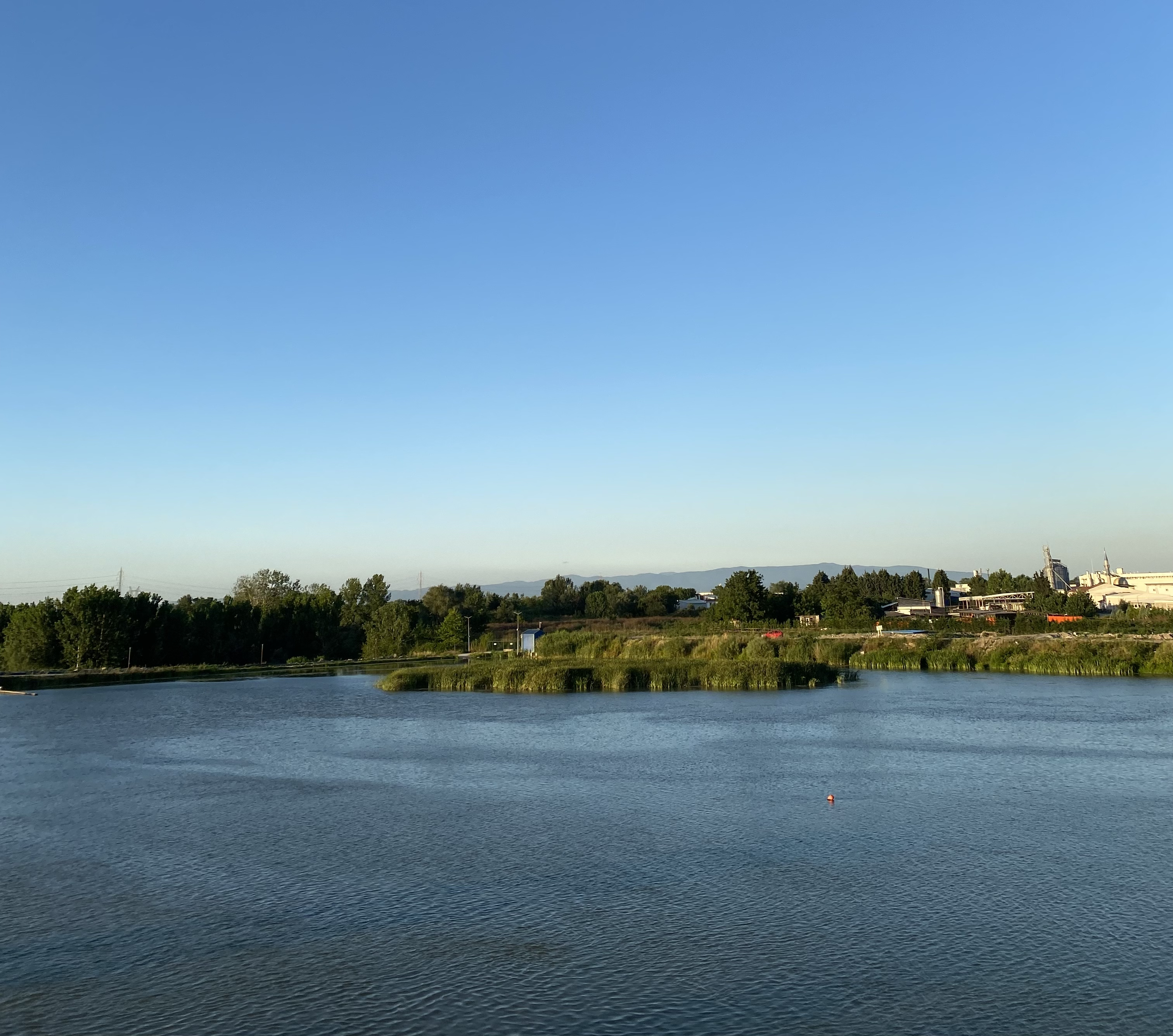
Who?	Into what?	By whom?	Notes	Image
Achelous	Achelous River	Gaia	In one versions of Achelous' origins, he was an earth-born man who lost all his daughters, the Sirens, and called upon his mother Gaia to receive him in her embrace. Achelous vanished into the earth, and soon after that Gaia made a river appear that bore her son's name.
Acheron	Acheron river	Zeus ?	Acheron in some versions was originally a son of Helios by either Demeter or Gaia who was changed into the Underworld river because he refreshed the Titans with water during their fight against Zeus.
Acis	Acis river	Galatea	The mortal Acis and the nymph Galatea were happily in love, but the cyclops Polyphemus also loved her. One day he saw them together, and in rage killed Acis by hurling a huge rock at him. Galatea saved her beloved by transforming him into a river god.
Aea	Aea	Phasis (?)	Aea was a Colchian hunter that the river-god Phasis fell in love with and pursued. Aea tried to flee, but she eventually got tired and he captured her, and bound her on the waves of the sea, as an island or land. Aea was the name of the colony Aeëtes built on the Phasis.
Alope	Spring	Poseidon	Alope exposed the infant son she had by Poseidon. When the infant was brought to her father Cercyon, he recognised the baby's clothes and immediately realised what had happened. He ordered Alope to be put to death, and her infant son to be exposed again. Poseidon later turned Alope's body into a spring bearing her name.
Alpheus	Alpheus river	Unclear	Although usually a god from the get go, in some tales Alpheus was originally a mortal hunter who was changed into a river-god following his pursuit of Arethusa.
Arethusa	Spring	Hera	Arethusa became the lover of the god Poseidon and bore him a son. Under unclear circumstances, the goddess Hera transformed Arethusa into a spring in Euboea which bore her name.
Arethusa	Spring	Artemis	Arethusa was a young nymph that caught the eye of the river god Alpheus, who pursued her relentlessly. Artemis, feeling sorry for the nymph, turned her into a spring (though Alpheus' efforts wouldn't stop there).
Asteria	Delos	Herself	Asteria, after transforming into a quail and plunging herself into the sea to escape the amorous advances of Zeus, turned into a small rocky island that was not fixed to the sea floor, but instead wandered around. Following the birth of Artemis and Apollo (the children of her sister Leto) on her, Asteria received the name "Delos" and was fixed in place by Apollo.
Atlas	Atlas Mountains	Perseus via Medusa	Atlas, the Titan who held the sky in his back as punishment, was turned into stone and then a mountain range in one version after the hero Perseus made him look Medusa's severed head, as a way of salvation.
Aura ("breeze")	Spring	None	The nymph Aura was a hunting companion of Artemis who openly questioned Artemis' virginity due to the overly feminine shape of her body. As punishment, Artemis arranged for Aura to be raped by Dionysus with the help of Nemesis and Eros. After giving birth to twins (and eating one of them) Aura drowned herself, and was turned into a spring.
Byblis	Spring	None, nymphs	Byblis was a mortal woman who was tormented with romantic feelings for her own twin brother Caunus. Although she tried to woo him, he rejected her, not wanting to engage in incest, and in the end he ran away from her. Byblis in despair withered away, and due to her constant crying she was changed into a spring. In other versions she hang herself or she was made into a nymph by other nymphs.
Calliste	Santorini	The gods	After revealing herself to Euphemus in a dream, Calliste ordered him to find her a home by the Nereids and the island of Anaphne. Euphemus tossed the clod of earth into the sea, and it thus transformed into the island of Calliste, now known as Santorini.
Chione ("snowy")	Cloud	Hermes	Chione was a mortal girl who was raped by some peasant. Hermes then turned her into a cloud by the orders of Zeus.
Cleite	Spring	Unclear	When her husband was killed by some Argonauts, Cleite turned into a spring out of sorrow.
Cyane ("blue")	Pond	None	Cyane was one of Persephone's nymph companions. When Hades burst through the ground and snatched Persephone, Cyane was unable to save the young goddess. She cried bitter tears, and was turned into a small pond.
Haemus ("bloody") and Rhodope ("rosy")	Haemus Mons and the Rhodope Mountains	Zeus and Hera	Haemus and Rhodope, king and queen of Thrace, bragged of being a more happy couple than Zeus and Hera. Enraged, the king and queen of gods turned them into mountain ranges; the Haemus Mons and the Rhodope Mountains.
Lichas	Lichades islets	Unclear	Lichas was a companion of Heracles, whom Heracles flung across the waves because he brought him Deianira's poisoned shirt, and he transformed into a group of rocky islets situated between Euboea and the coast of Locris.
Lilaeus	Mt. Lilaeon	Selene	Lilaeus was an Indian shepherd who angered the gods when he decided to only worship Selene out of them all, performing rituals and mysteries in the dead of the night. So they sent two lions to him who tore him apart. Selene, honouring the man who had adored her so, turned him into a mountain.
Manto's tears	Spring	Unclear	After the war of the Epigoni, Manto was captured and brought to Delphi. There, Rhacius married her and brought her to Colophon or Claros in Asia Minor, where she founded an oracle of Apollo. As she arrived in the new land, she shed tears for her homeland, and those tears turned into a spring.
Marsyas's siblings' tears	Maeander river	Unclear	Marsyas challenged the god Apollo in a music contest, panpipes against lyre, where Apollo was proclaimed as the winner. As punishment, Apollo flayed Marsyas alive. Marsyas' brothers and sisters mourned him so much their tears became a river, the Marsyas in Phrygia, which joined the Maeander near Celaenae.
Niobe	Weeping rock	Zeus	Niobe was a mortal queen of Thebes who bragged of being a greater mother than the goddess Leto, due to having given birth to more children (twelve or fourteen) than Leto's two. After the offended Leto's children, Artemis and Apollo, shot down each and every one of Niobe's sons and daughters, Niobe was turned into a crying rock out of sorrow.
Perimele	Perimele island	Poseidon	Perimele kept a secret affair with the river god Achelous. When her father discovered that, he pushed her off a cliff into the sea. Poseidon then transformed her into an island bearing her name, one of the Echinades islets.
Pirene	Pirene fountain	None	Pirene was a mortal woman. When her son by Poseidon Cenchrias was killed by Artemis, she was reduced to nothing but tears. Thus she turned into the Pirene fountain outside the gates of Corinth.
Pyramus and Thisbe	Pyramus river and spring	Unclear	Pyramus and Thisbe were two young lovers who decided to elope. When Pyramus arrived at the agreed place, he saw that Thisbe's cloak, bloody and torn by a lioness (Thisbe had arrived earlier, but hid when the lioness came). Believing her to be dead, he killed himself. When Thisbe returned, and saw him dead, she took her life as well. He was transformed into the river and she into a spring.
Rhodopis	Fountain	Artemis	Rhodopis and Euthynicus were two virginal hunters devoted to Artemis and chastity. Aphrodite, playing with them, commanded Eros to make them fall in love. The two broke their vows of purity, and in anger, Artemis changed Rhodopis into a fountain.
Sangas	Sangarius river	Rhea	Sangas was a mortal man who offended the goddess Rhea, whereupon she changed him into a river, the Sangarius in Anatolia.
Selemnus	Selemnus river	Aphrodite	Selemnus was a shepherd who loved a nymph named Argyra, but she left him when he got older and he died of grief. Aphrodite then turned him into a river, the waters of which were believed to cure unrequited love.
Sybaris	Spring	None	Sybaris was a monster that terrified Crisa, near Delphi. A man named Eurybarus decided to face the beast in order to save Alcyoneus, whom he had fallen in love with, and threw Sybaris off the crags. Sybaris hit her head, and disappeared. On that spot, a spring sprang that the people thereafter called Sybaris.

=== Metamorphoses into humanoid lifeforms ===
Metamorphoses into humanoids
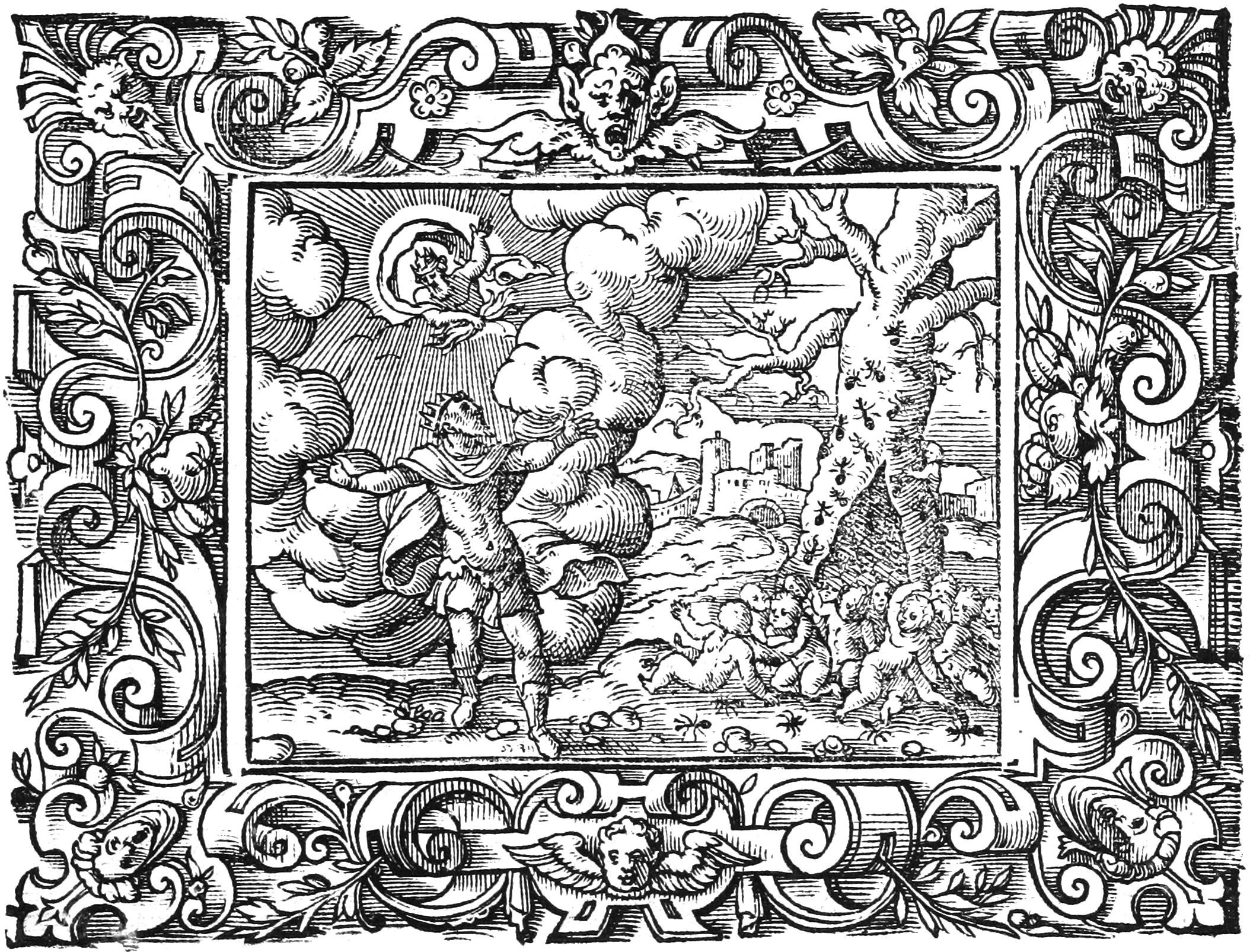
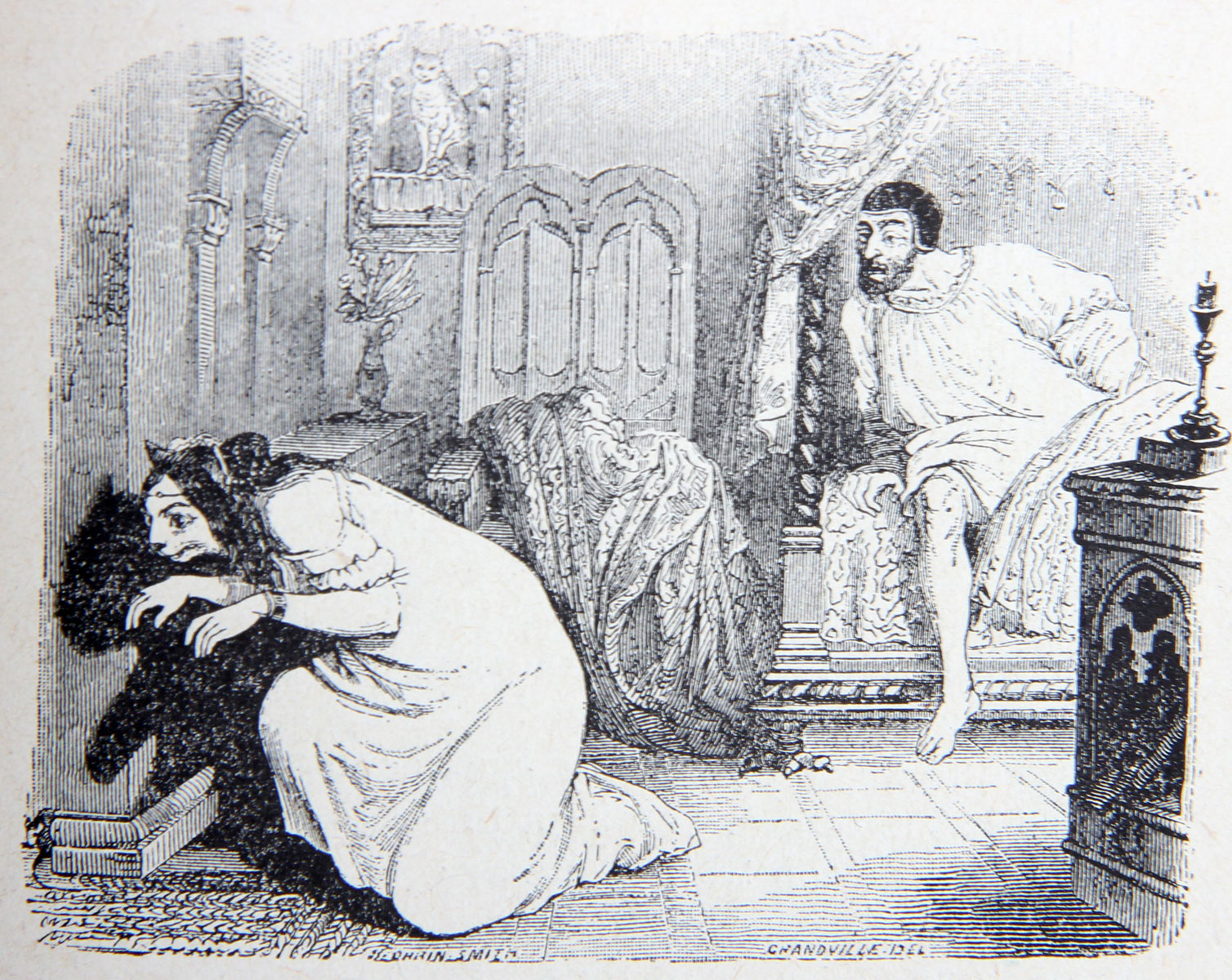
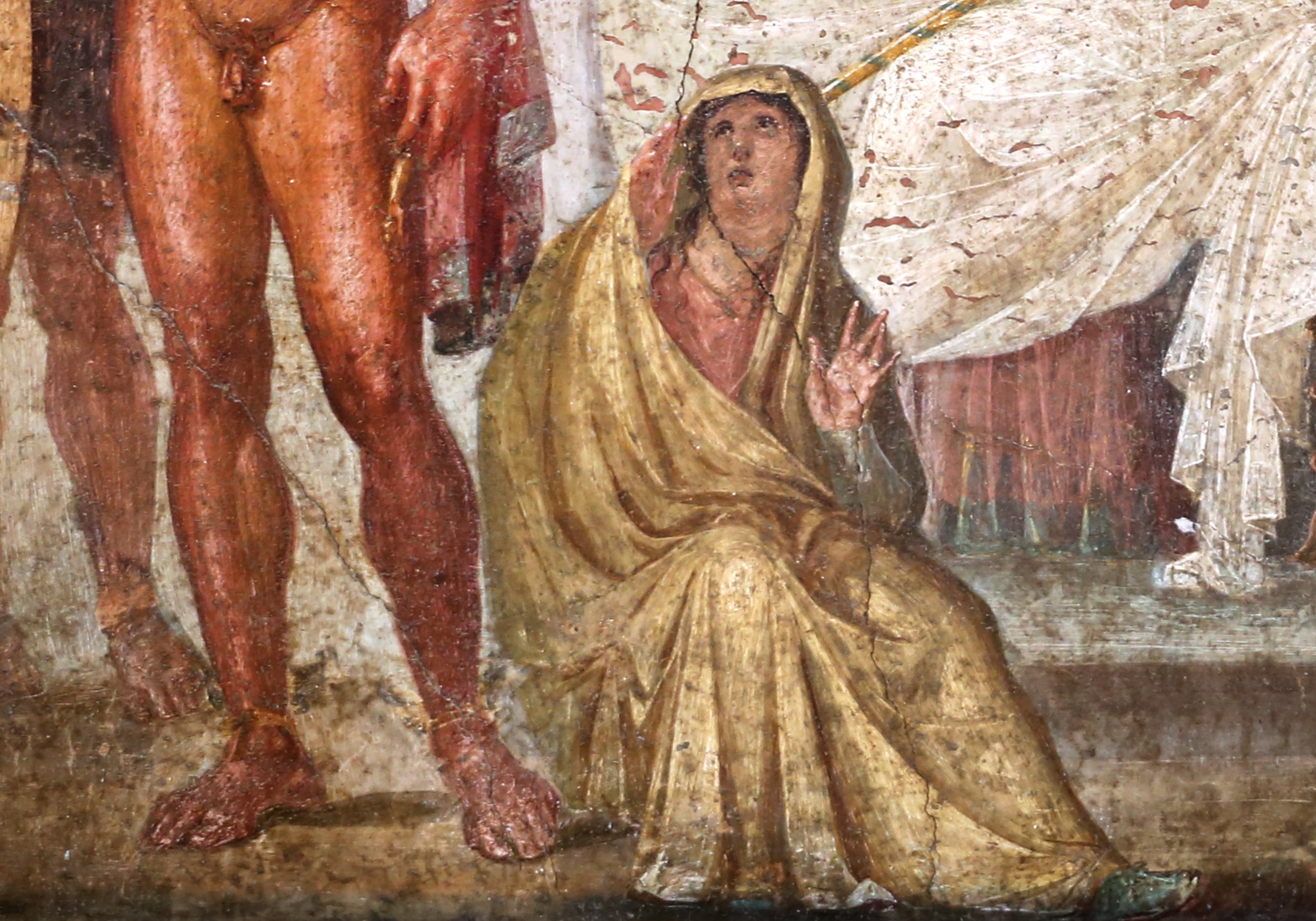
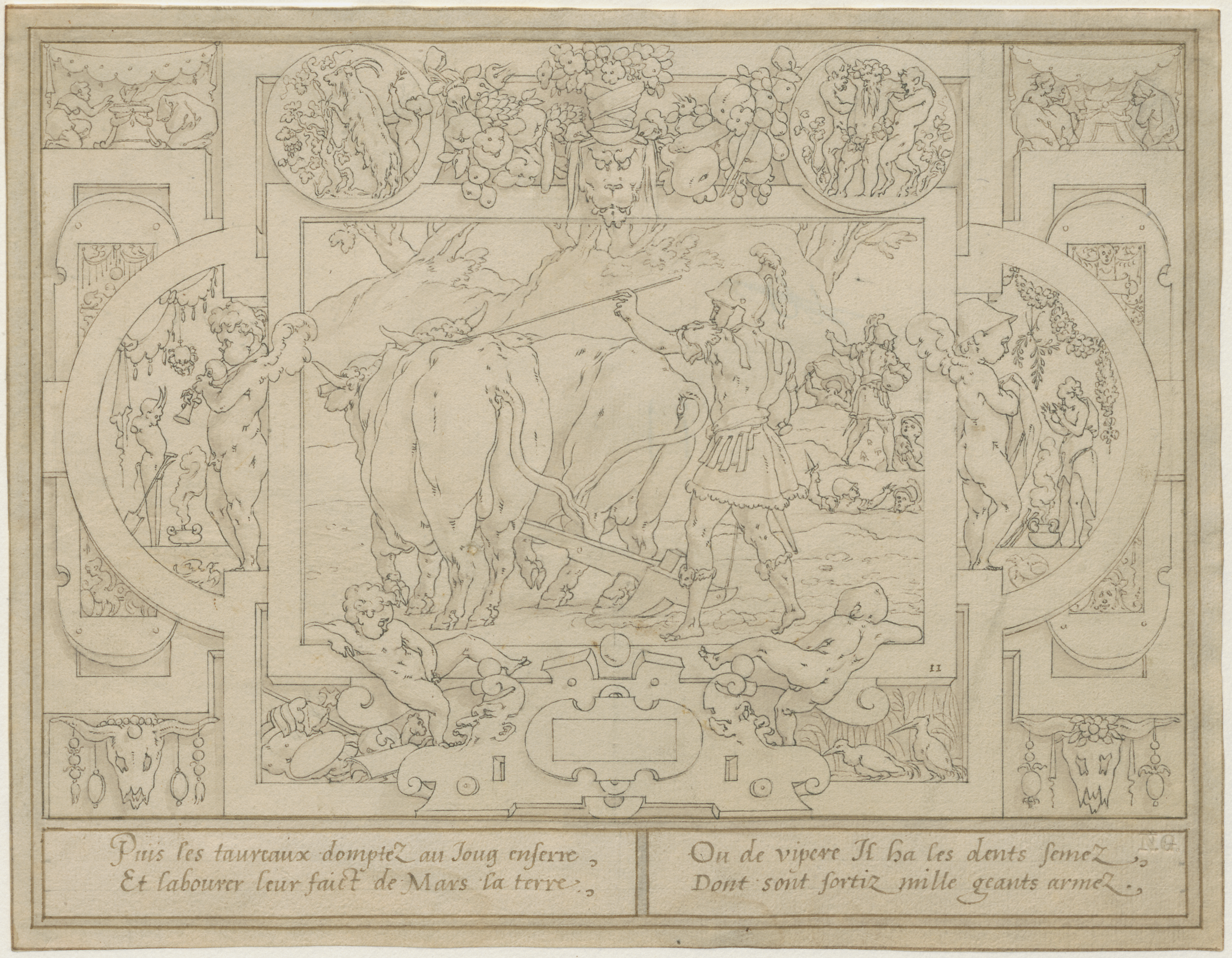
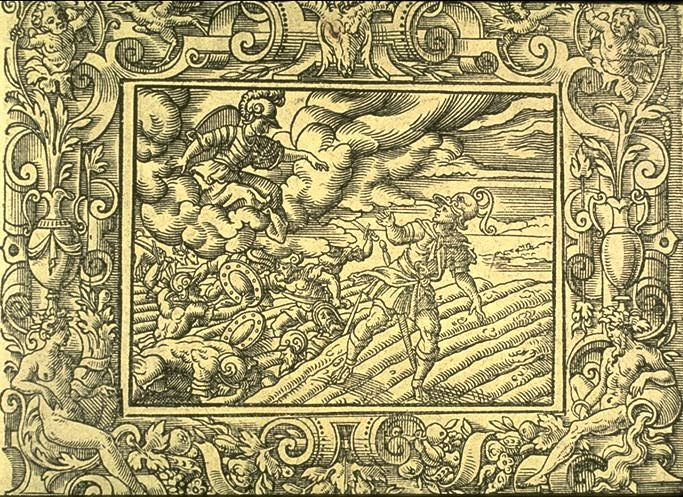
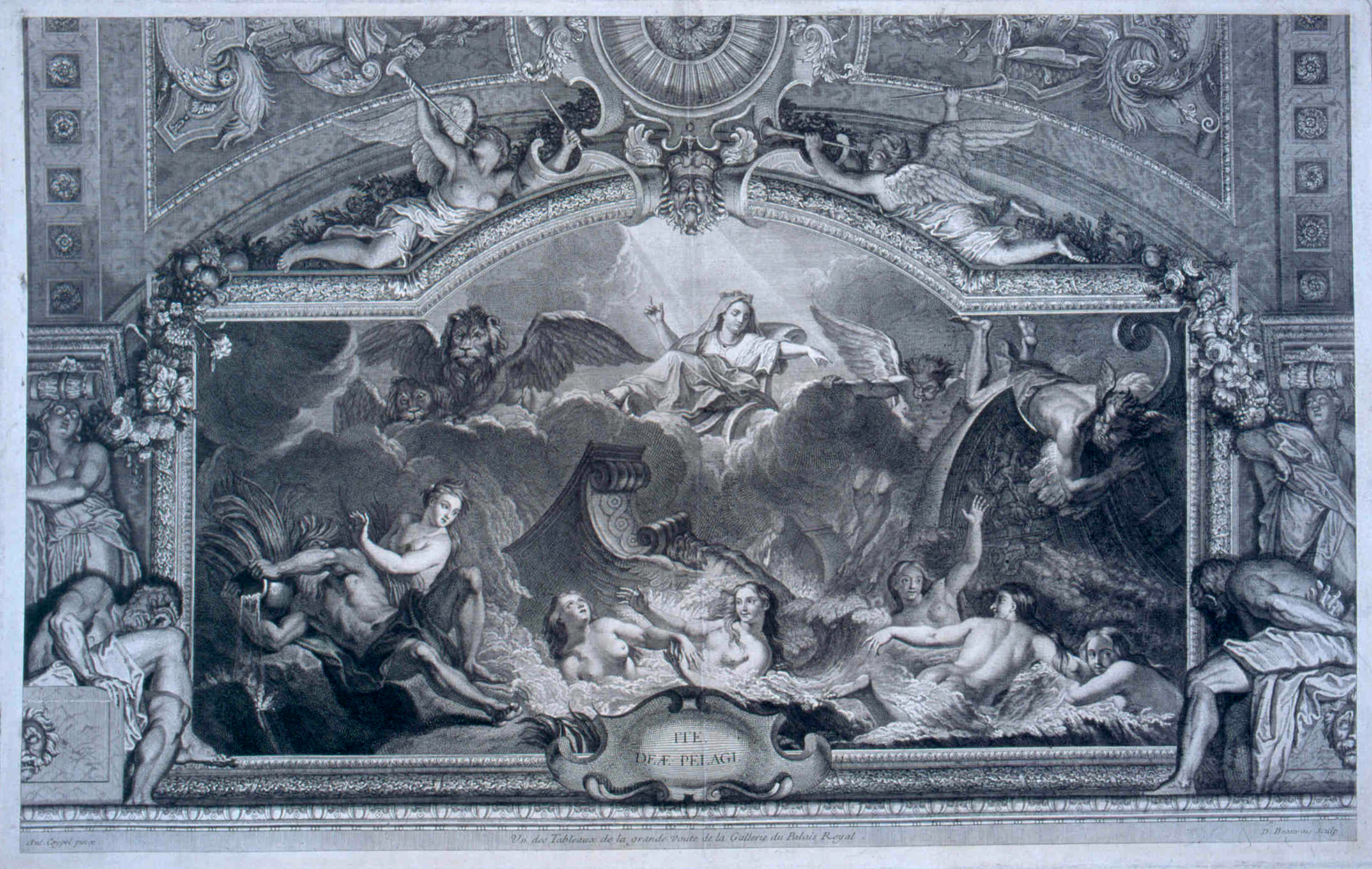
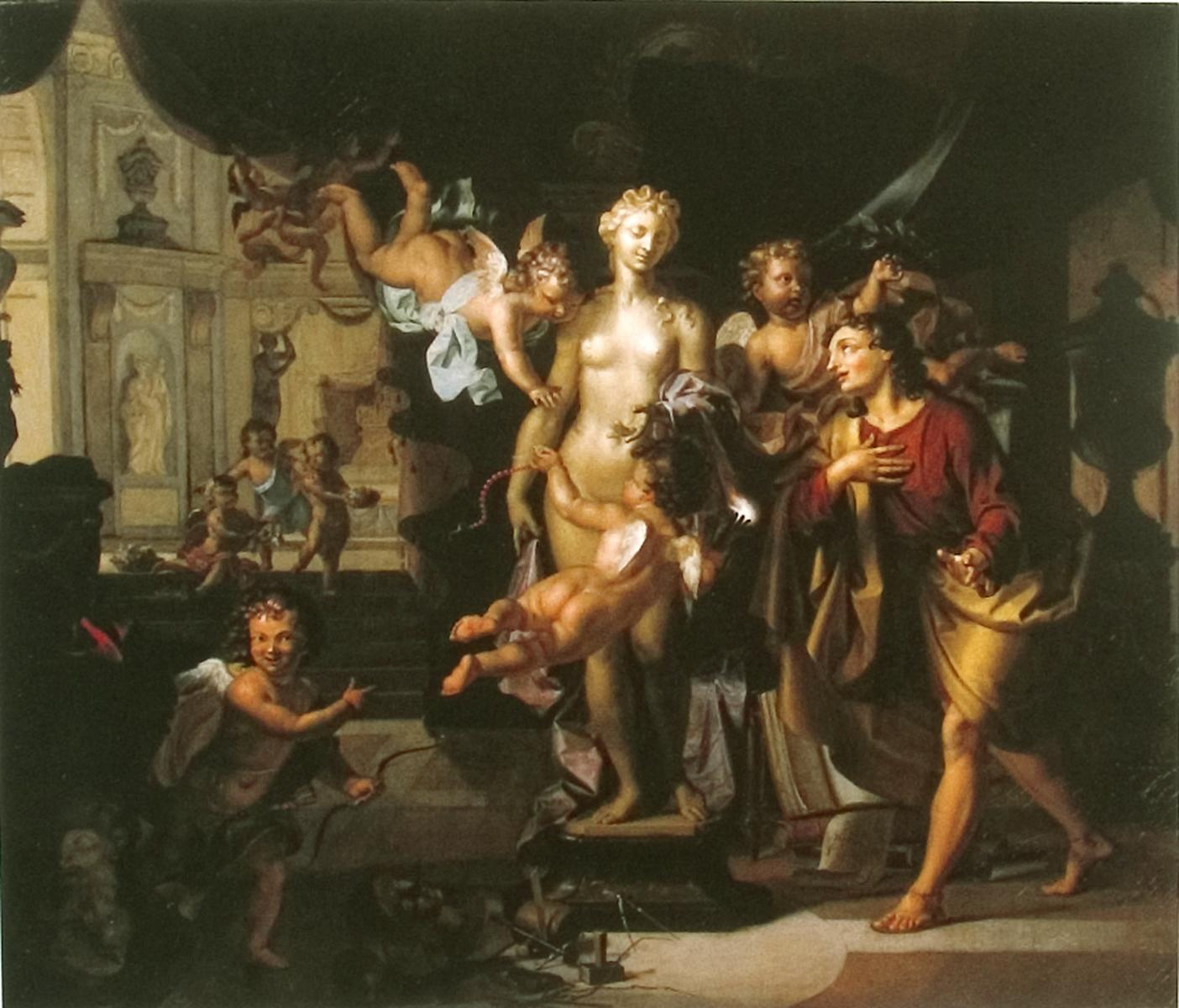
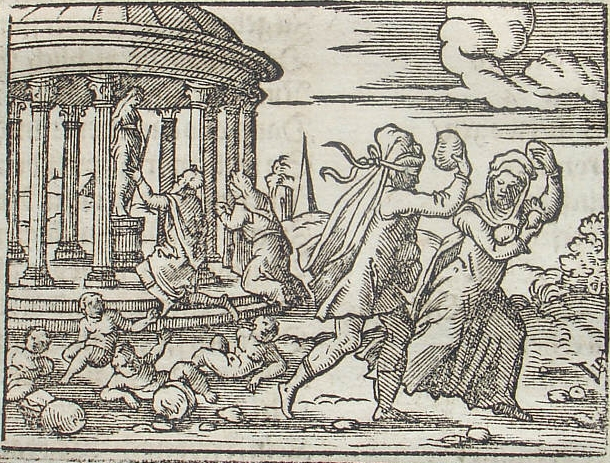
Who?	Into what?	By whom?	Notes	Image
Ants	Myrmidons ("ant people")	Zeus	After Hera sent a deadly plague to the island of Aegina which killed off the entire population (for the island had been named after one of Zeus' lovers) Zeus and Aegina's son Aeacus (and sole survivor) prayed to Zeus to help him repopulate the island. Zeus then transformed the ants on the island into men and women. Aeacus was Achilles's grandfather, and when he set sail to Troy, he was accompanied by Myrmidon warriors.
Cat	A woman, then back a cat	Aphrodite	In an Aesop's fable, a female house cat falls in love with her human owner. Aphrodite, touched, fulfils the cat's wish to be transformed into a woman, as long as she leaves all her animal instincts behind. The cat agrees, and as a woman marries her owner. One day, as she spotted a mouse running loose in the house, she got on all fours in order to chase it. Aphrodite seeing that, and realising the cat had not given up on her old ways at all, transformed her back into a house cat.
Clod of earth	Calliste	Itself	The sea-god Triton presented Euphemus, one of the Argonauts, a clod of earth as a token of friendship. In Euphemus' dream the clod transformed into a woman named Calliste, who introduced herself as the daughter of Triton and the nymph Libya.
Cloud	Nephele ("cloud")	Zeus	When Ixion tried to seduce Hera, Zeus created a Hera look-alike from a cloud, whom he named Nephele, and sent her to Ixion. Ixion was deceived and slept with Nephele, whereupon Zeus, having proved Ixion was not worthy of the gods' favour, threw him into Tartarus and gave Nephele's hand in marriage to the mortal King Athamas.
Dragon's teeth	Spartoi ("sown ones")	None	As part of the trials Jason had to accomplish in order to gain the Golden Fleece, King Aeetes made him sow dragon's teeth and then fight the warriors that sprang from said teeth. Jason tricked them into killing each other.
Dragon's teeth	Spartoi ("sown ones")	None	When Cadmus arrived in Boeotia, he fought and killed a dragon on the site he was ordered to found a new city. He sowed the teeth, and from them sprang the Spartoi, who helped Cadmus found Thebes and became the ancestors of the city's nobility.
Foal	Arne	None	She had been born a foal because her mother had been transformed into a horse when she had her, but she was given a human form and named Arne.
Hulls (Cymodoce et al)	Sea nymphs	Rhea/Cybele	When the Trojan refugee Aeneas and his followers landed in Italy, a local Italic warrior named Turnus set Aeneas's pine-framed vessels afire. The goddess Rhea or Cybele, remembering that those hulls had been crafted from trees felled on her holy mountains back in Troad, transformed the vessels into sea nymphs.
Ivory statue	Galatea ("milk-white")	Aphrodite	The talented sculptor Pygmalion created the perfect woman out of ivory, as he was not impressed by the living women around him. Pygmalion came to fall in love with the lifeless creation, and begged Aphrodite to help him. She answered by giving life to the statue, who became his wife thereafter.
Rocks	Humans	The gods	After the great deluge wiped off all life on earth, Deucalion and Pyrrha were the sole survivors of the human race. They were ordered to throw some rocks behind their shoulders as they walked. The rocks Deucalion threw became men, those Pyrrha threw, women. This new race of humans were sometimes identified with the Leleges, a supposed pre-Greek people of the Aegean.
She-bear	Woman	Unclear	In some versions, after the death of Procris, Cephalus asked an oracle whether he would have offspring. The oracle told him that in order to get children, he should mate with the first female being he saw. Right after Cephalus encountered a she-bear and mated with her. The she-bear then turned into a human woman, who bore him a son, Arcesius.

=== Metamorphoses into inanimate objects ===
Metamorphoses into plants
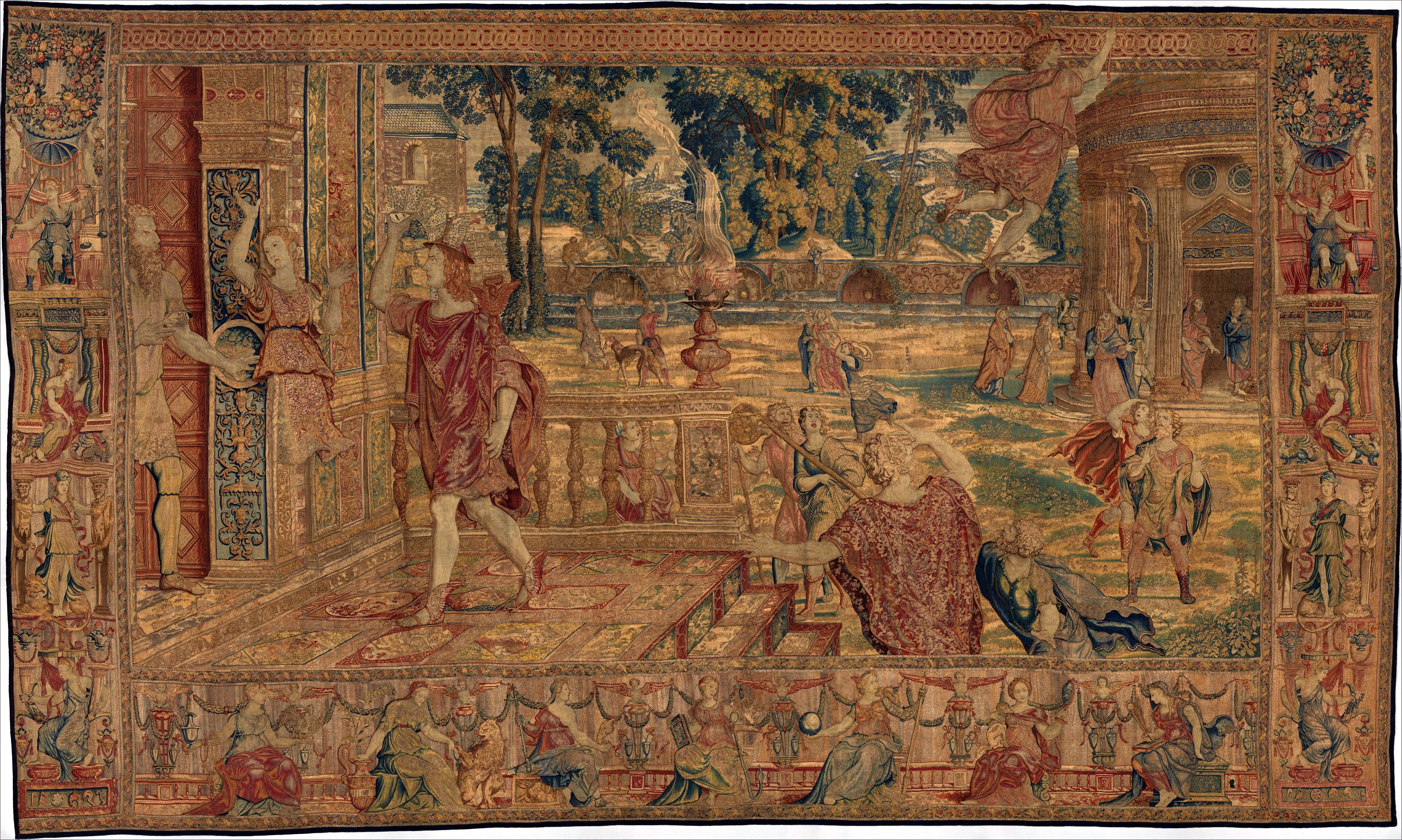
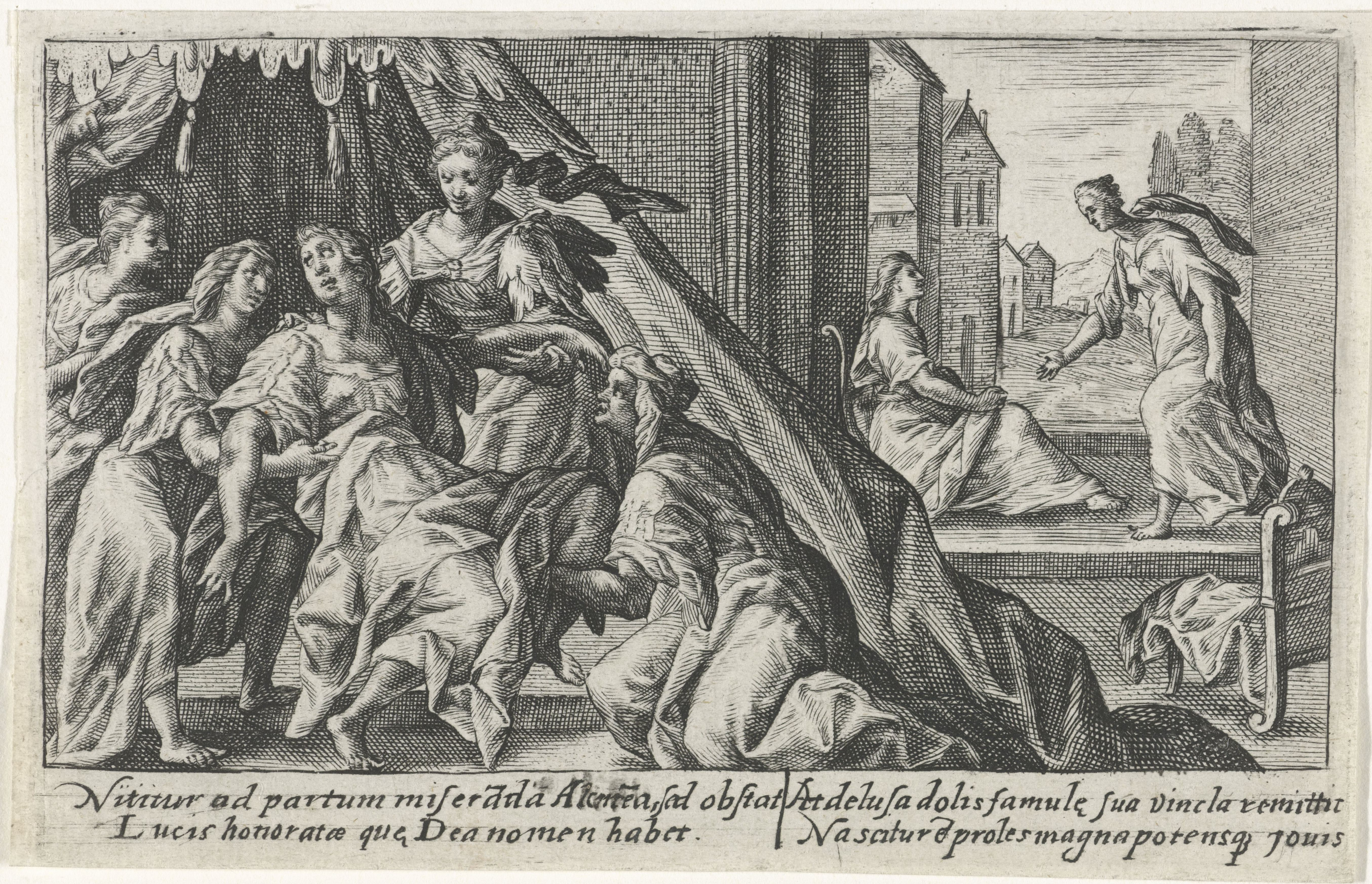
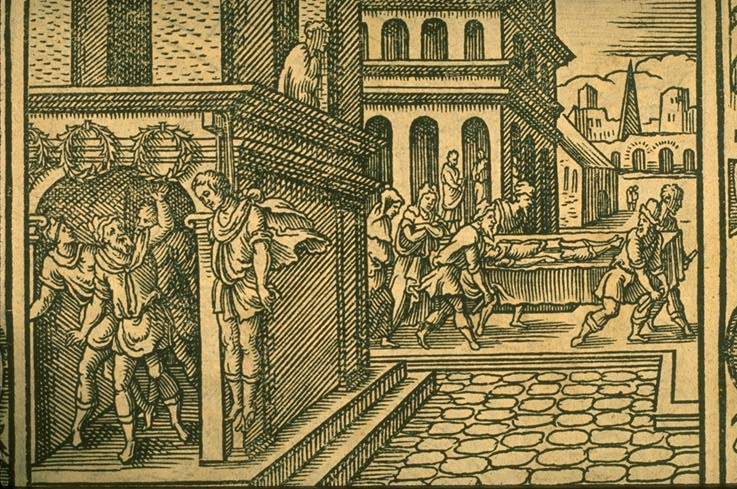
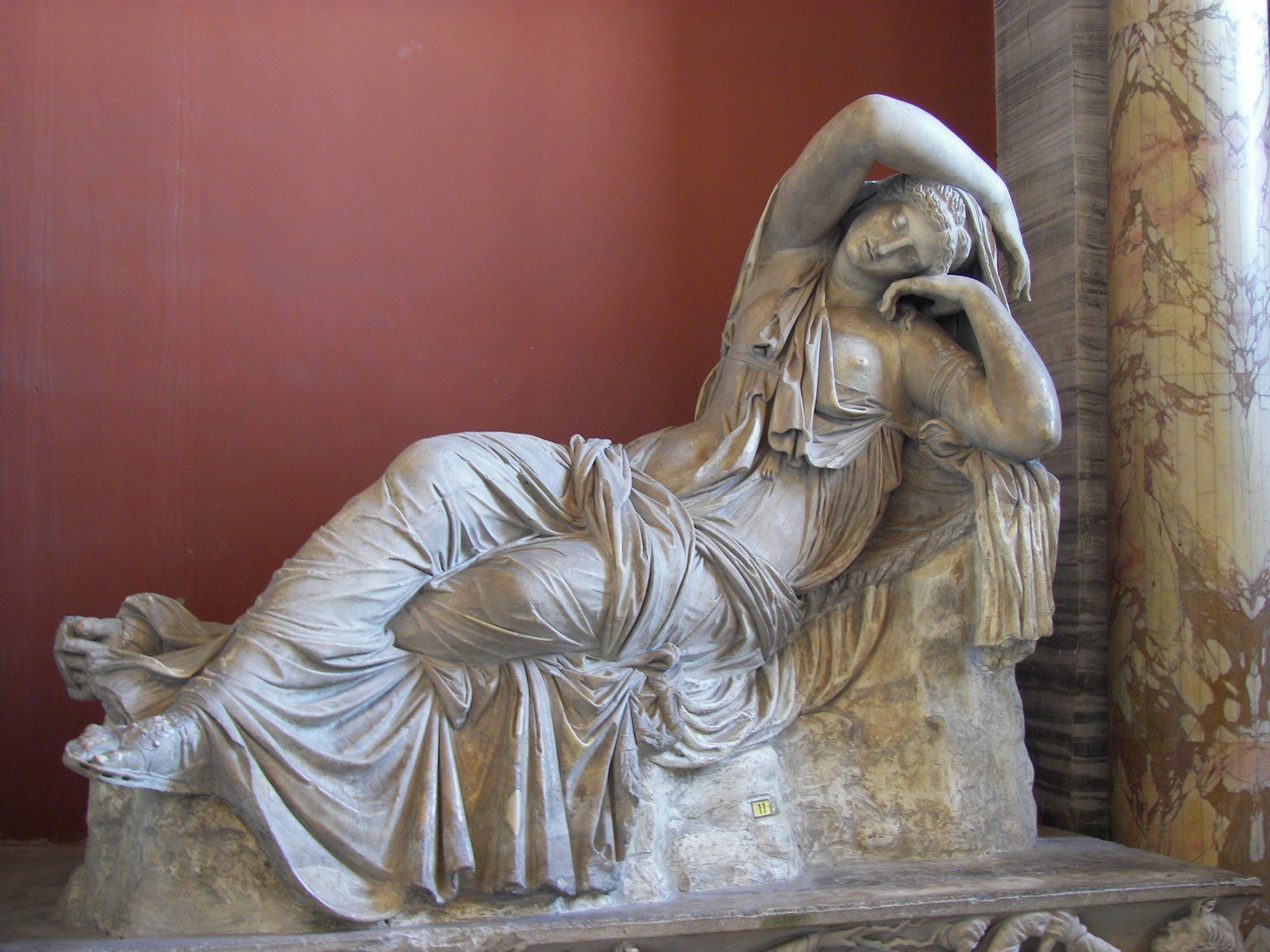
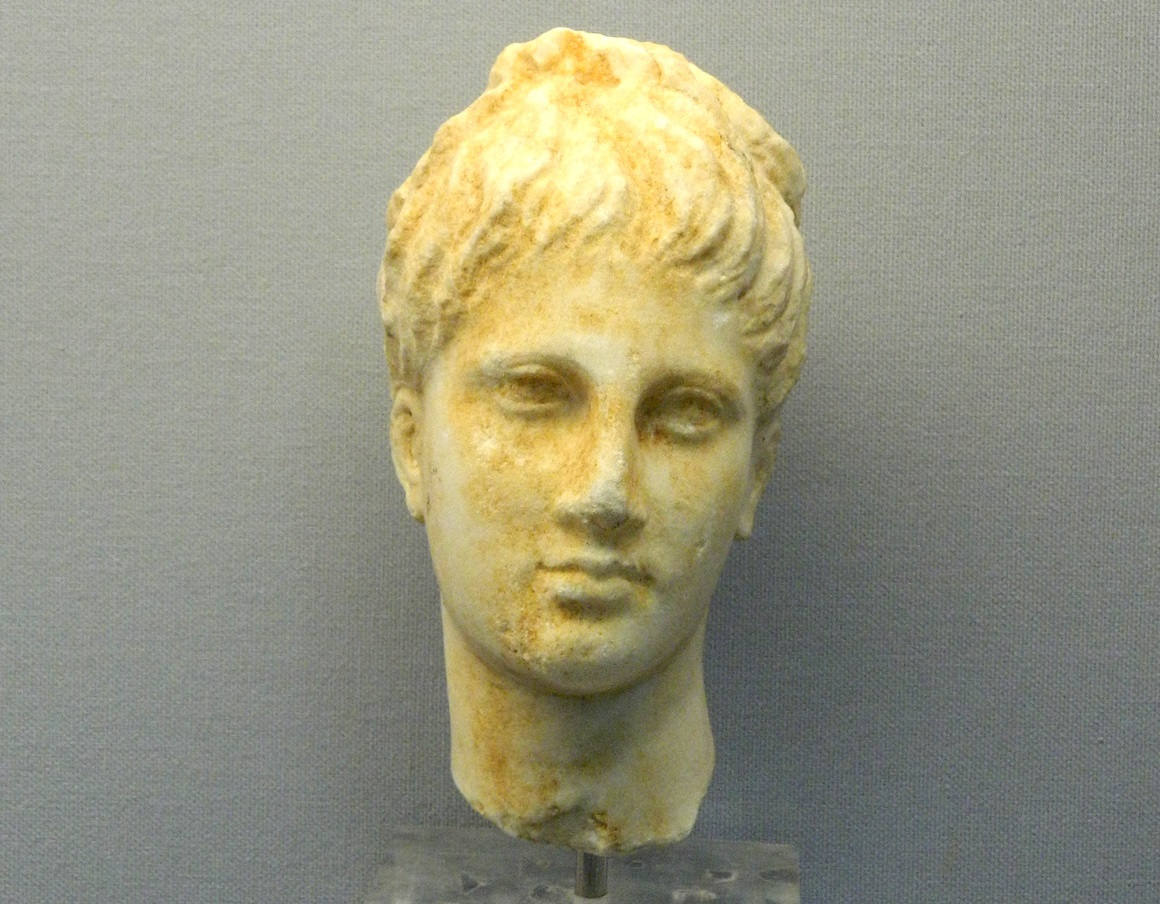
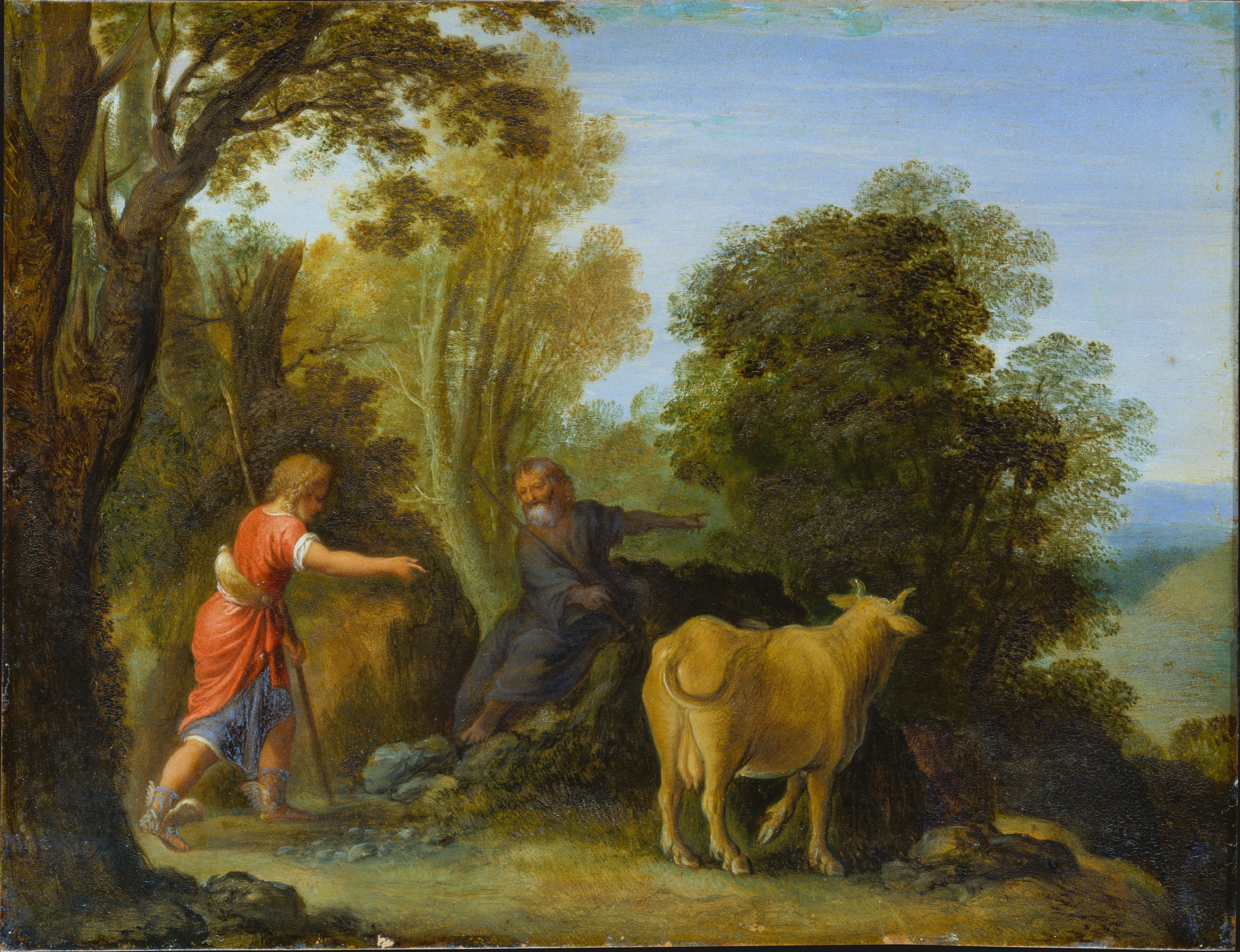
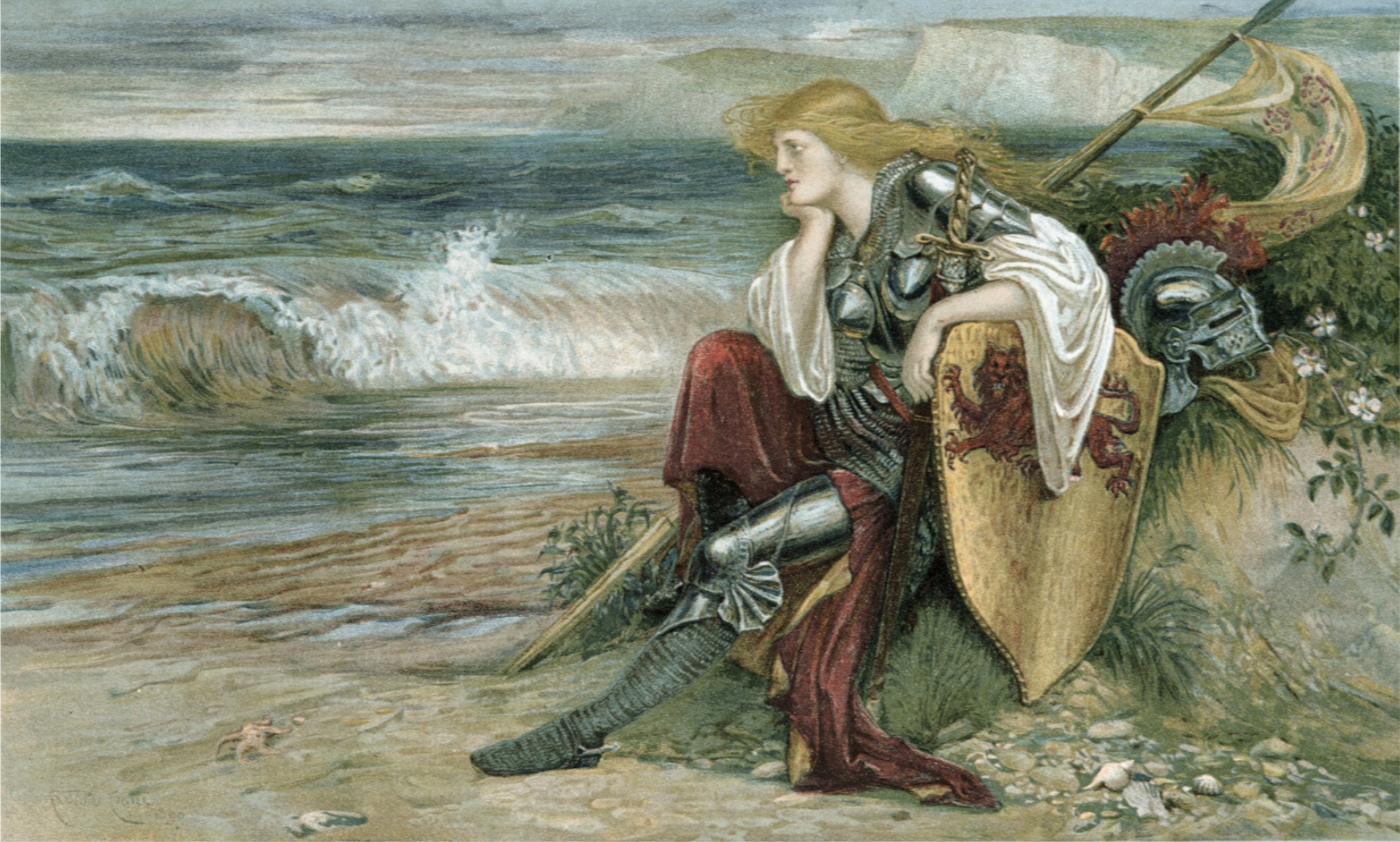
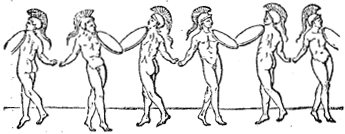
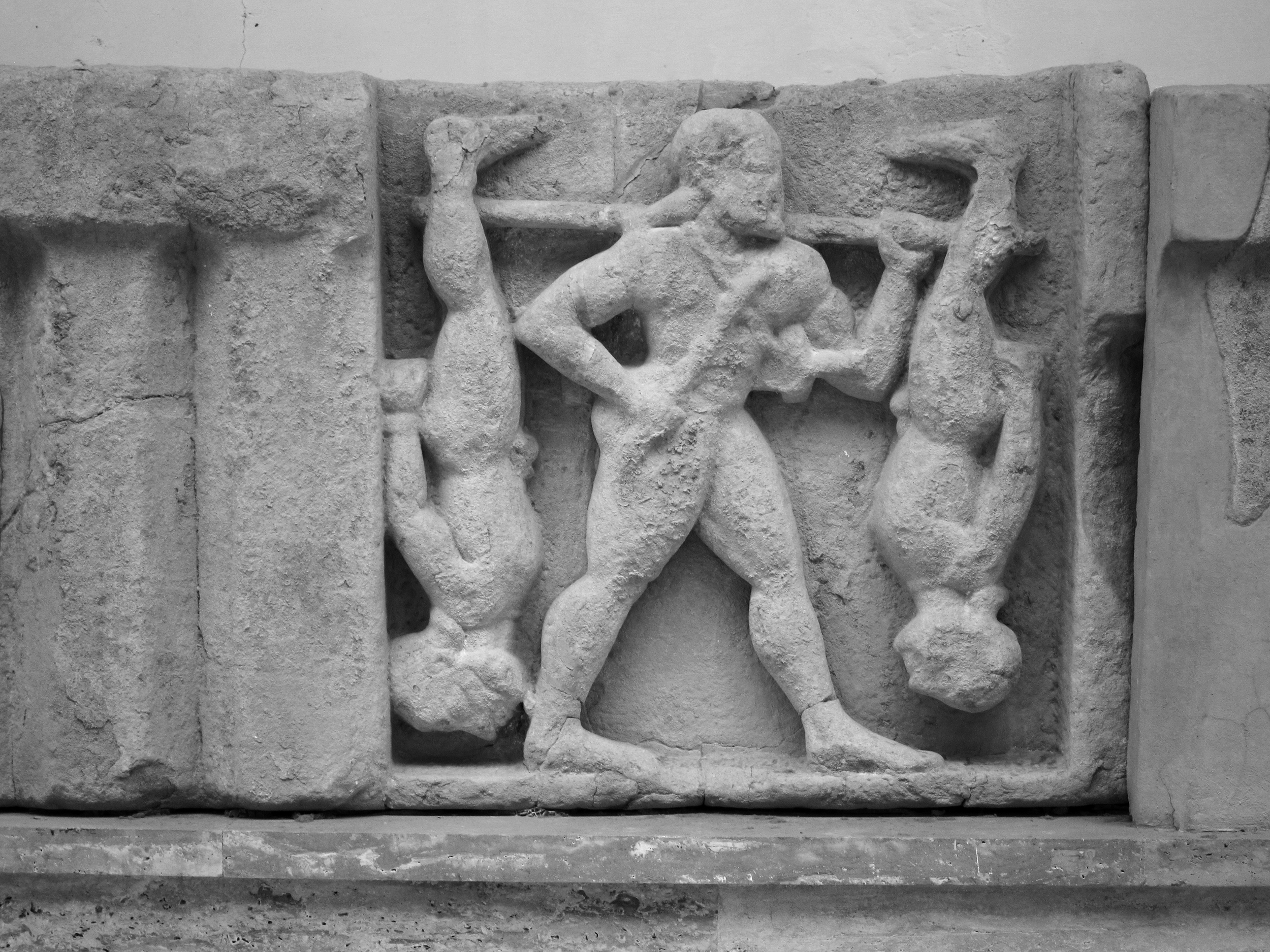
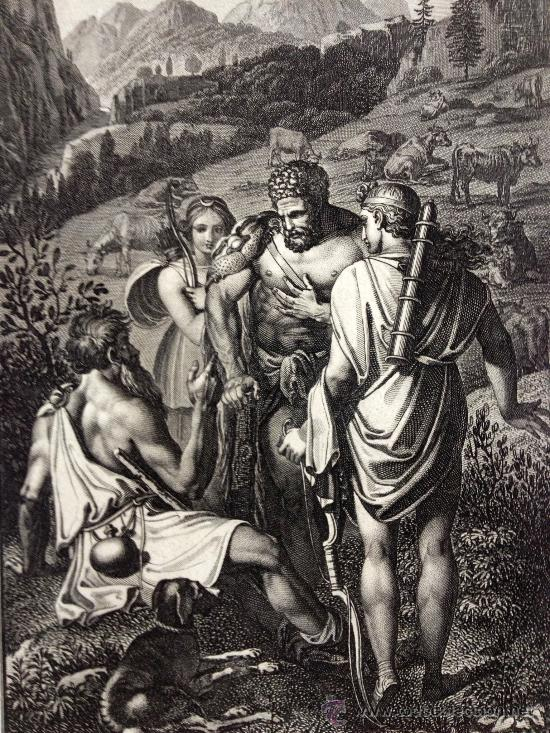
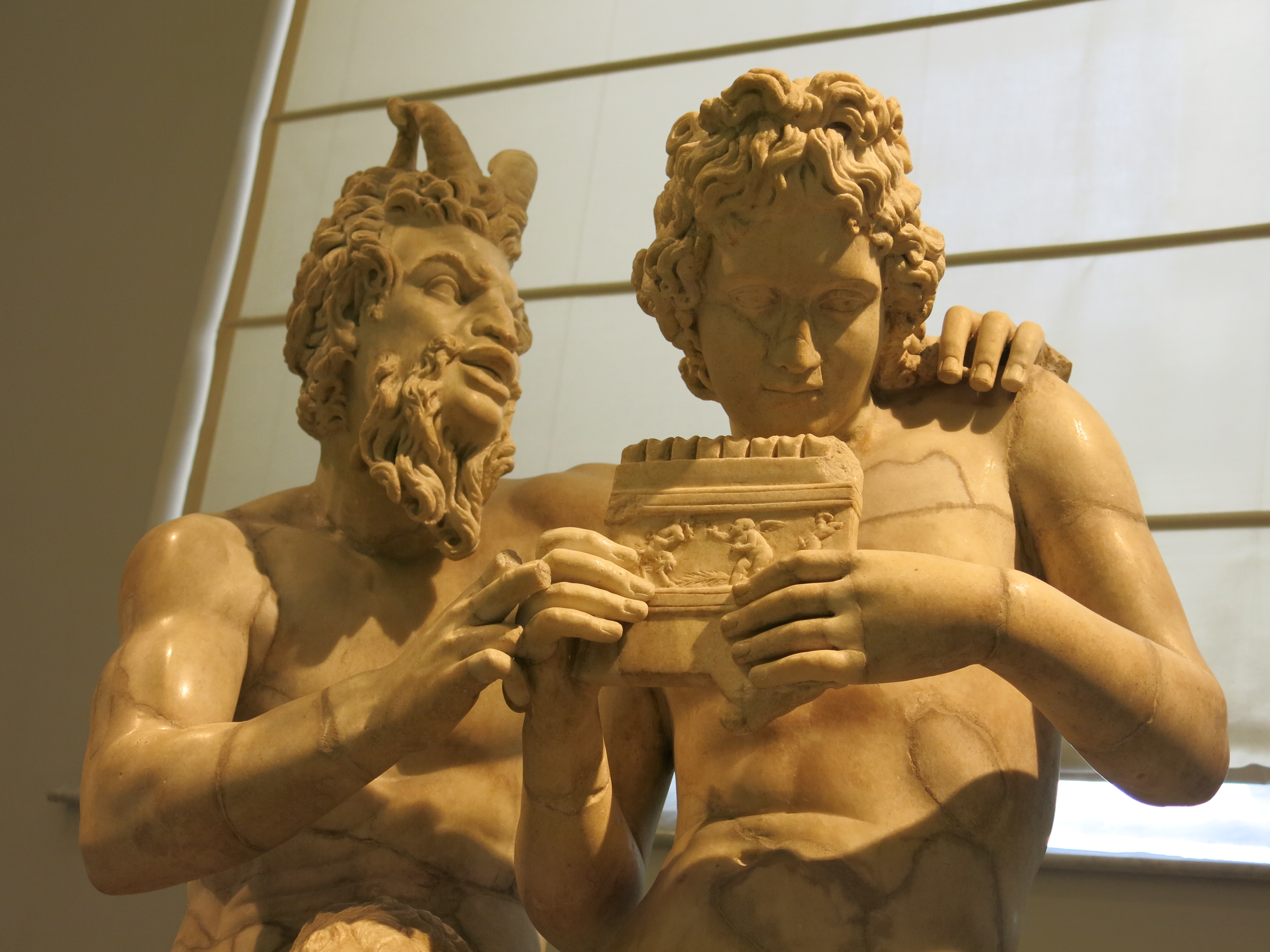
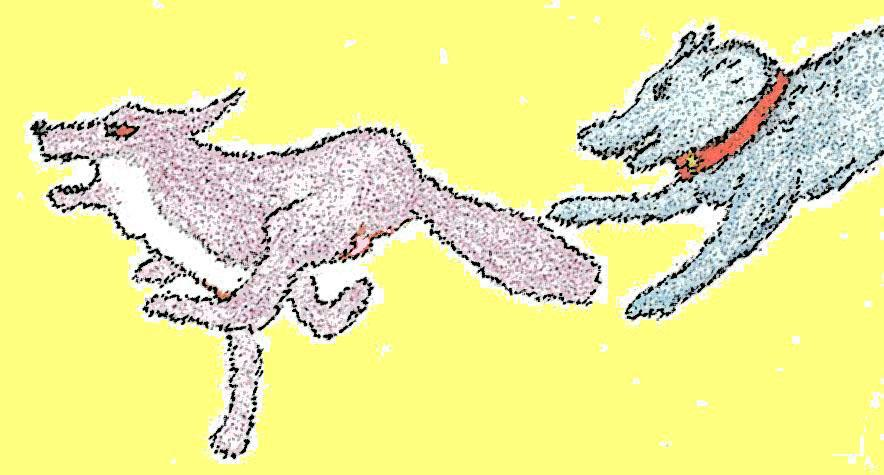
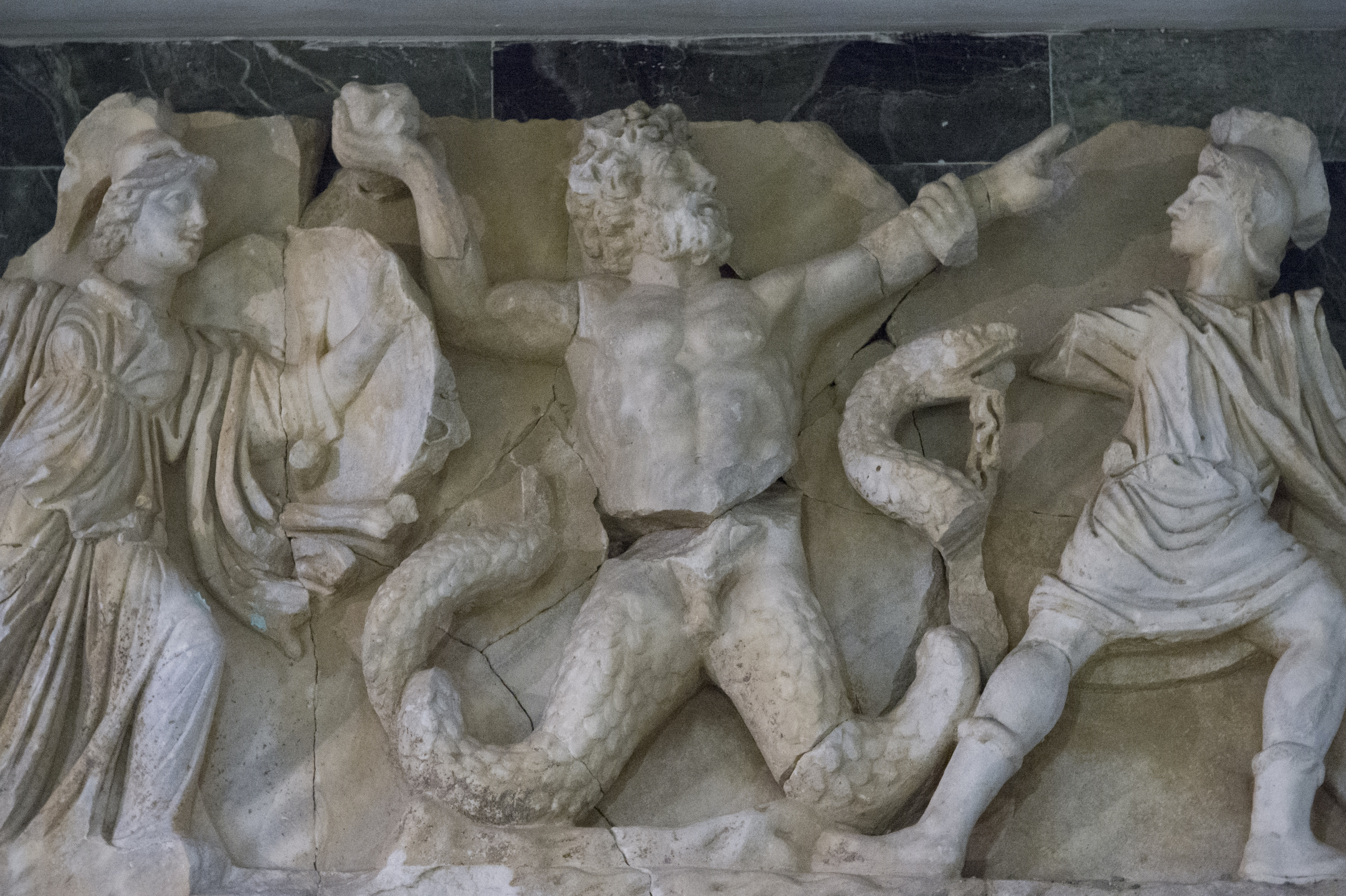
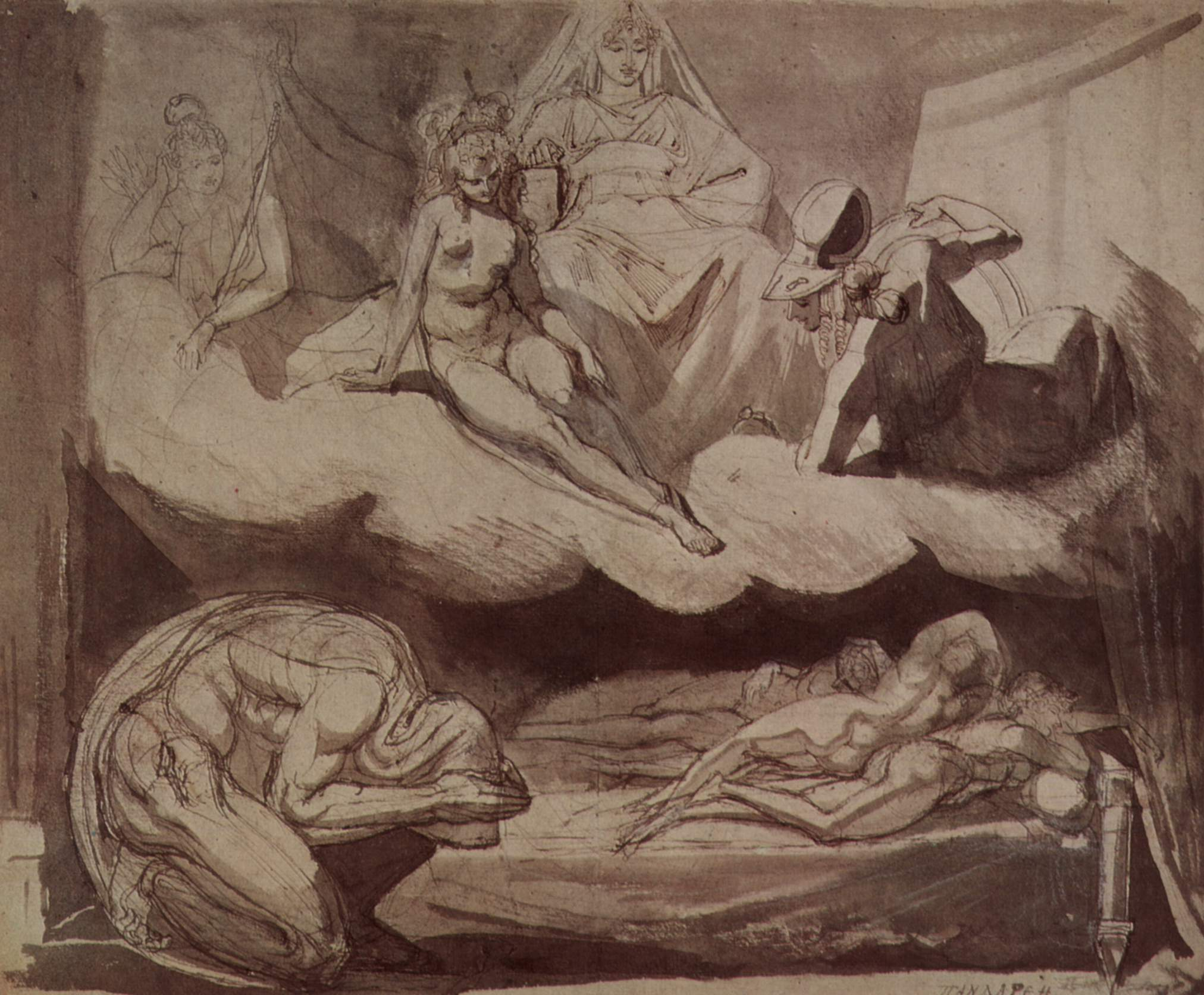
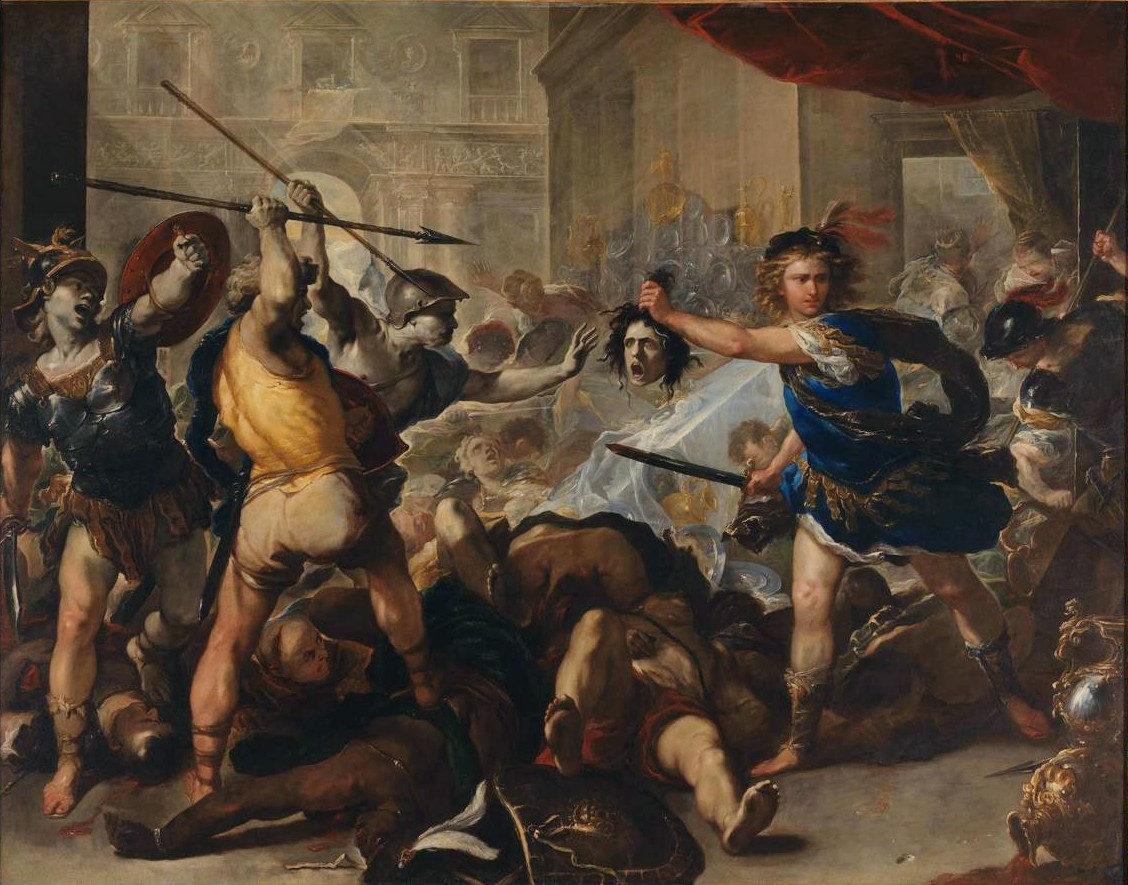
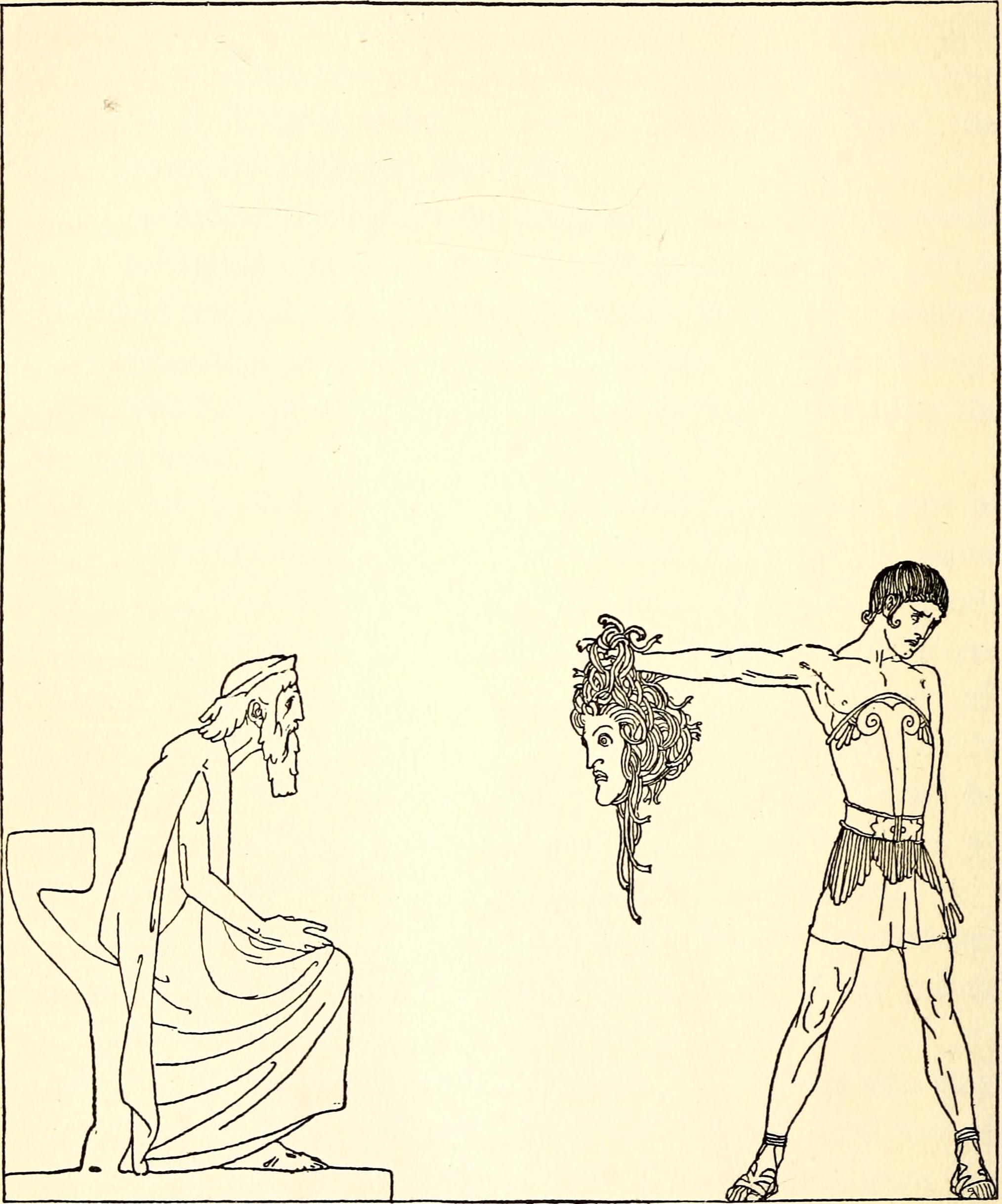
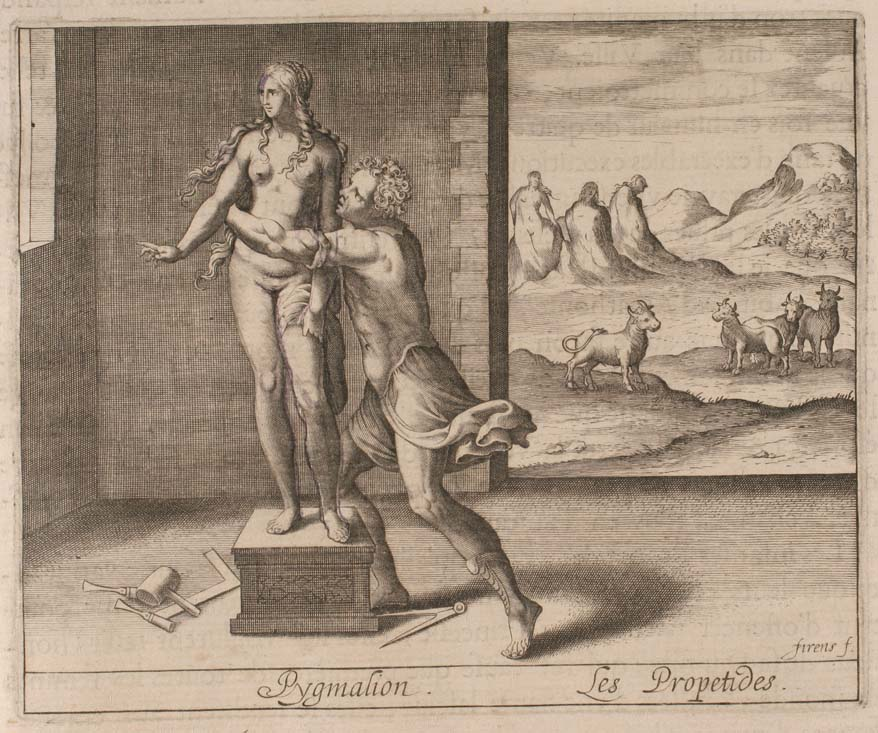
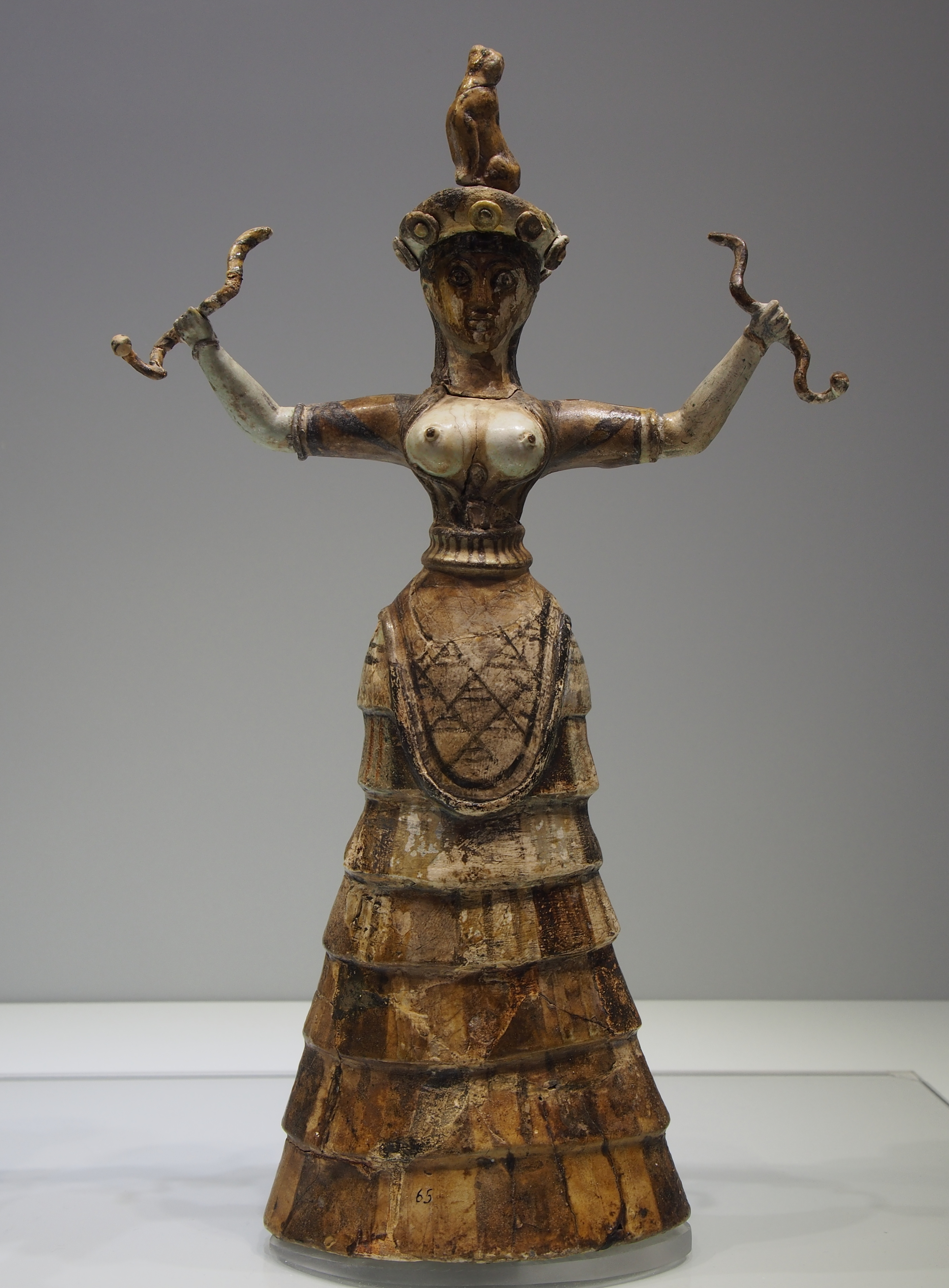
Who?	Into what?	By whom?	Notes	Image
Aconteus	Stone	Perseus via Medusa	Aconteus was one of Perseus's allies who was accidentally turned to stone during Perseus's fight with Phineus.
Aglaurus	Stone	Hermes	Hermes fell in love with the Athenian princess Herse, and tried to gain access into her bedchamber one night. Herse's jealous sister Aglaurus however barred his entry into the house and refused to move. Hermes, in anger, changed Aglaurus into stone.
Alcmene	Stone	Unclear	After her death, the body of Heracles's mother Alcmene was transformed into stone.
Anaxarete	Stone	Aphrodite	Anaxarete was a girl of noble blood who attracted the attention of a man named Iphis. He courted her to no success, as she kept on rejecting him. She spurned and mocked him, until he took his own life. Anaxarete was unmoved, and made unflattering comments during his funeral. Aphrodite, furious, turned her into a stone statue. This is very similar to the tale of Arsinoe.
Ariadne	Stone	Perseus via Medusa	According to Nonnus, Ariadne was killed by Perseus at Argos when he turned her into stone with the head of Medusa, during Perseus' war against Dionysus, though usually Ariadne becomes a goddess and ascends on Olympus with the other gods.
Arsinoe	Stone	Aphrodite	Arceophon courted the princess Arsinoe, but her father Nicocreon would not allow such marriage to take place. He tried to bribe her wetnurse into letting him meet with Arsinoe, but Arsinoe told her parents, who maimed and kicked out the wetnurse. Arceophon then killed himself. When during his funeral Arsinoe leaned out of her window to watch, Aphrodite turned her into a stone statue.
Aspalis	Wooden statue of Artemis	Unclear (Artemis?)	Aspalis was chosen to be the concubine of the local tyrant of Melite, who demanded the most beautiful women to be brought to him as mistresses. Aspalis killed herself rather than be violated. As they were about to give her a burial, her body disappeared, with only a wooden statue of Artemis left in its place.
Battus	Stone	Hermes	Battus was a shepherd who witness the infant Hermes stealing Apollo's cattle. Hermes bid him not to tell anyone what he had seen, but Battus betrayed his secret, so Hermes turned him to stone.
Britomartis	Statue	Unclear	In one story, Britomartis left Crete to escape from the advances of King Minos and arrived in Aegina, where a fisherman tried to violate her. She jumped off her boat and disappeared forever, only for her statue to appear in the temple of Artemis nearby.
Calydon	Stone	Artemis	Calydon was a Calydonian man who saw Artemis as the goddess was bathing naked and was transformed into stone for that. A mountain was named after him.
Celmis	Steel	Unclear	Celmis was one of the Dactyls that Rhea put to guard the infant Zeus in Crete. At some point he was transformed into steel.
Cercopes	Stone	None	The Cercopes were a pair of uncivilized brothers challenged Heracles and were turned into stone. In another tale, they were turned into monkeys by Zeus instead.
Cragaleus	Stone	Apollo	Cragaleus was seen as just and wise, and was one day visited by three gods; Apollo, Artemis, and Heracles who asked him to settle an argument as to which of the three should become patron-god of the city of Ambracia, in Epirus. All three presented their claims and reasoning why they should be chosen over the other two. In the end, Cragaleus chose Heracles, deeming him to be the most worthy of the city. Apollo however was angered over losing Ambracia, so he turned Cragaleus into stone as punishment.
Cypriot old woman	Stone	Aphrodite	Aphrodite turned an elderly woman from Cyprus into stone when she betrayed Aphrodite's hiding place in Cyprus to the other Olympian gods.
Daphnis	Stone	A nymph	Daphnis was a young shepherd, a son of Hermes and follower of the goddess Artemis. Daphnis fell in love with a nymph (whose name varies on tradition) and she asked that he would be faithful to her forever. Eventually, Daphnis was intoxicated by a princess, and broke his promise to the nymph. He was either blinded or turned into stone as a result.
Gorgo	Stone	Unclear	A story similar to those of Arsinoë and Anaxarete, Gorgo was a Cretan woman who was turned into stone while watching the funeral of Asander, a man who had wooed her while alive.
Iodame	Stone	Athena via the Gorgoneion	Iodame was a priestess of Athena. One night that she was carrying out temple duty, Athena appeared in front of her, bearing the Gorgoneion (the head of Medusa on her shirt). Iodame was petrified immediately, and thereafter priestesses would repeat "Iodame lives and demands fire" thrice a day.
Laelaps and Teumessian fox	Stone	Zeus	Laelaps was a dog destined to catch every prey it hunted, and the Teumessian fox blessed to evade any hunter. When Laelaps chased down the fox, Zeus, recognizing the paradox, turned them both into stone, so neither the fox would be caught neither Laelaps fail in its task.
Lethaea and Olenus	Stone	The gods	Lethaea, a mortal woman, claimed to be more beautiful than any goddess. For her hubris she was turned into stone. Her husband Olenus wished to share the same fate as her, and was turned into stone as well.
Lyco and Orphe	Stone	Dionysus	Lyco and Orphe promised to Apollo to never betray the gods, but when Dionysus fell in love with their sister Carya, they tried to force them apart. For this Dionysus turned them both into stone.
Metioche and Menippe	Comets	Hades and Persephone	Once, Hades and Persephone sent a plague to Aonia, in Boeotia, and demanded virgin sacrifice to appease their wraths. Two maiden girls, Metioche and Menippe (the daughters of Orion), offered themselves to save the town, and sacrificed themselves using the shuttles of their looms. Hades and Persephone then turned their bodies into comets.
Niobe's compatriots (Note: Traditionally the murder of the Niobids happened at Thebes, however this petrification detail comes from Homer, who did not place Niobe and her myth at Thebes, making the nationality of the petrified people unclear.)	Stone	Zeus	After the murder of the Niobids by Artemis and Apollo, Zeus petrified all the citizens of Thebes (sans the mourning Niobe) for nine days, so the Niobids remained unburied and lying in their own blood during that time. On the tenth day the gods buried the children; the exact fate of the petrified people is not elaborated.
Pallas	Stone	Athena via gorgoneion	Pallas was one of the Giants who fought against the gods during the Gigantomachy, as the opponent of Athena. In one Roman version of his demise, Pallas was turned into a stone statue by Athena, who had used the head of Medusa against him.
Pandareus	Stone	Zeus	Pandareus tried to steal the golden dog that Rhea had once put to guard Zeus as an infant. Zeus turned him into stone for his insolence.
Phineus	Stone	Perseus via Medusa	Phineus was the brother of Cepheus and the betrothed of Andromeda. After Andromeda was rescued by Perseus and subsequently married to him, Phineus tried to claim her back and attacked Perseus, who petrified him with the head of Medusa.
Polydectes	Stone	Perseus via Medusa	Polydectes, the king of the island of Seriphos, was turned into stone when Perseus showed him Medusa's severed head. Polydectes himself had sent Perseus on the quest to retrieve the head of Medusa in hopes that he would die, so Polydectes would be free to marry Perseus's mother Danae undisturbed, as Perseus stood in his way.
Proetus	Stone	Perseus via Medusa	In one version of Proetus's tale, he was turned to stone by Perseus when the hero returned to Argos to claim his rightful inheritance. Proetus had previously usurped the throne from his brother Acrisius, Perseus' maternal grandfather who had cast the newborn Perseus and his mother Danae into the sea inside a chest.
Propoetides	Flints	Aphrodite	The Propoetides sisters dared to claim that Aphrodite was no real goddess, so she proved them wrong by turning them into flints.
Pyrrhus	Stone	Rhea	Pyrrgus was a mortal man who tried to force the goddess Rhea, so she turned him into stone instead.
Serpents	Stone	The gods	A serpent in Aulis where the entire Greek fleet had gathered devoured nine sparrows and was then turned into stone; Calchas interpreted this to mean that the war against Troy would last ten years.
Serpents	Stone	The gods	When two serpents visited Cadmus and Harmonia and coiled around their heads and shoulders, Zeus turned the snakes into stones, as a sign that it was Cadmus and Harmonia's destiny to be turned into serpents.
Unnamed man	Stone	None	An unnamed man was turned into stone out of fright when he saw Cerberus, the three-headed dog that guards the Underworld.
Wolf of Psamathe	Stone	Thetis or Psamathe	After Peleus killed his half-brother Phocus, who was Psamathe's son, out of jealousy, Psamathe sent a wolf to devour Peleus' herd for revenge. After the wolf had devoured part of the herd, it was turned to stone by either Psamathe herself or Thetis, Peleus's wife.

=== Metamorphoses into the opposite sex ===
Metamorphoses into the opposite sex
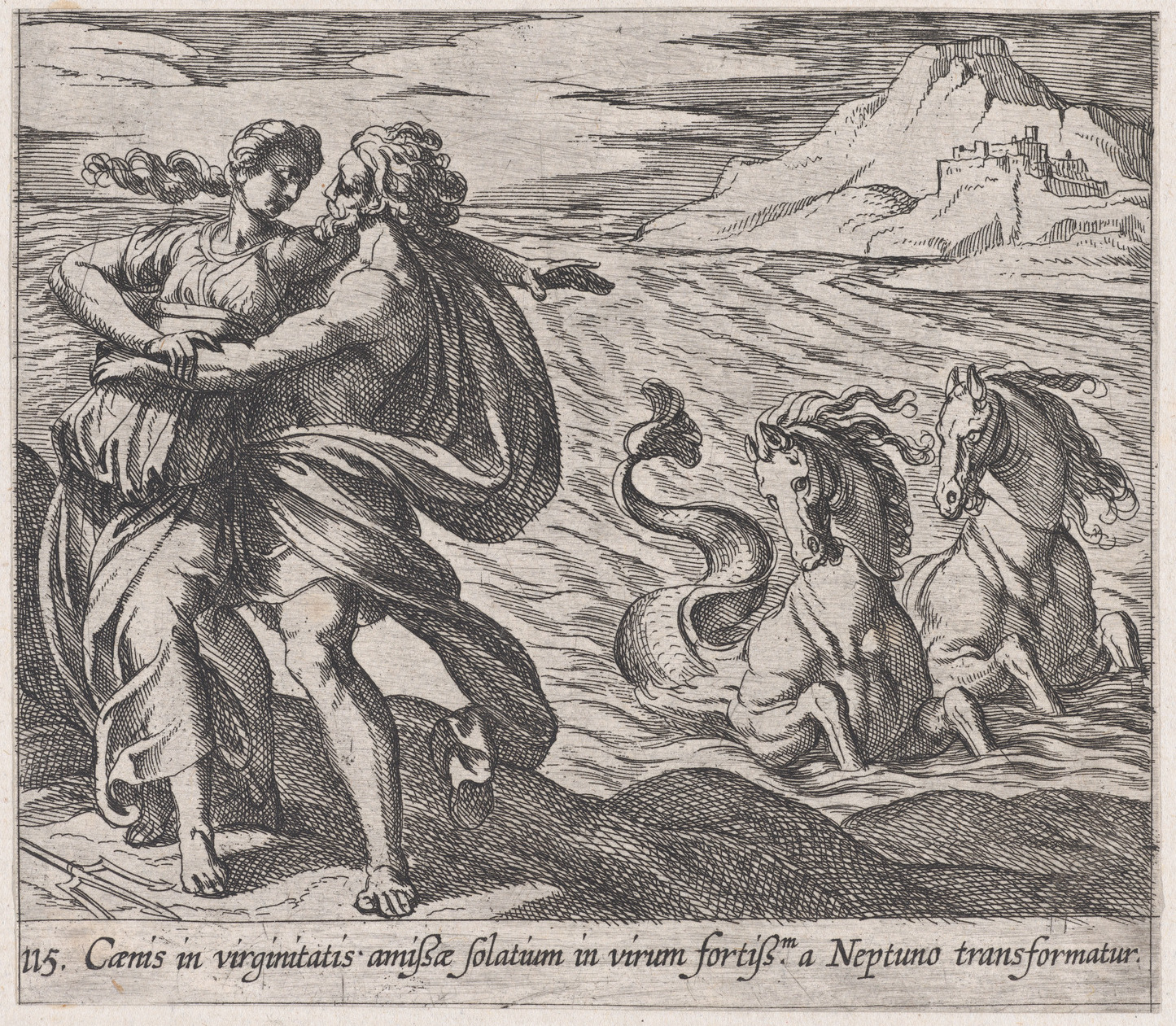
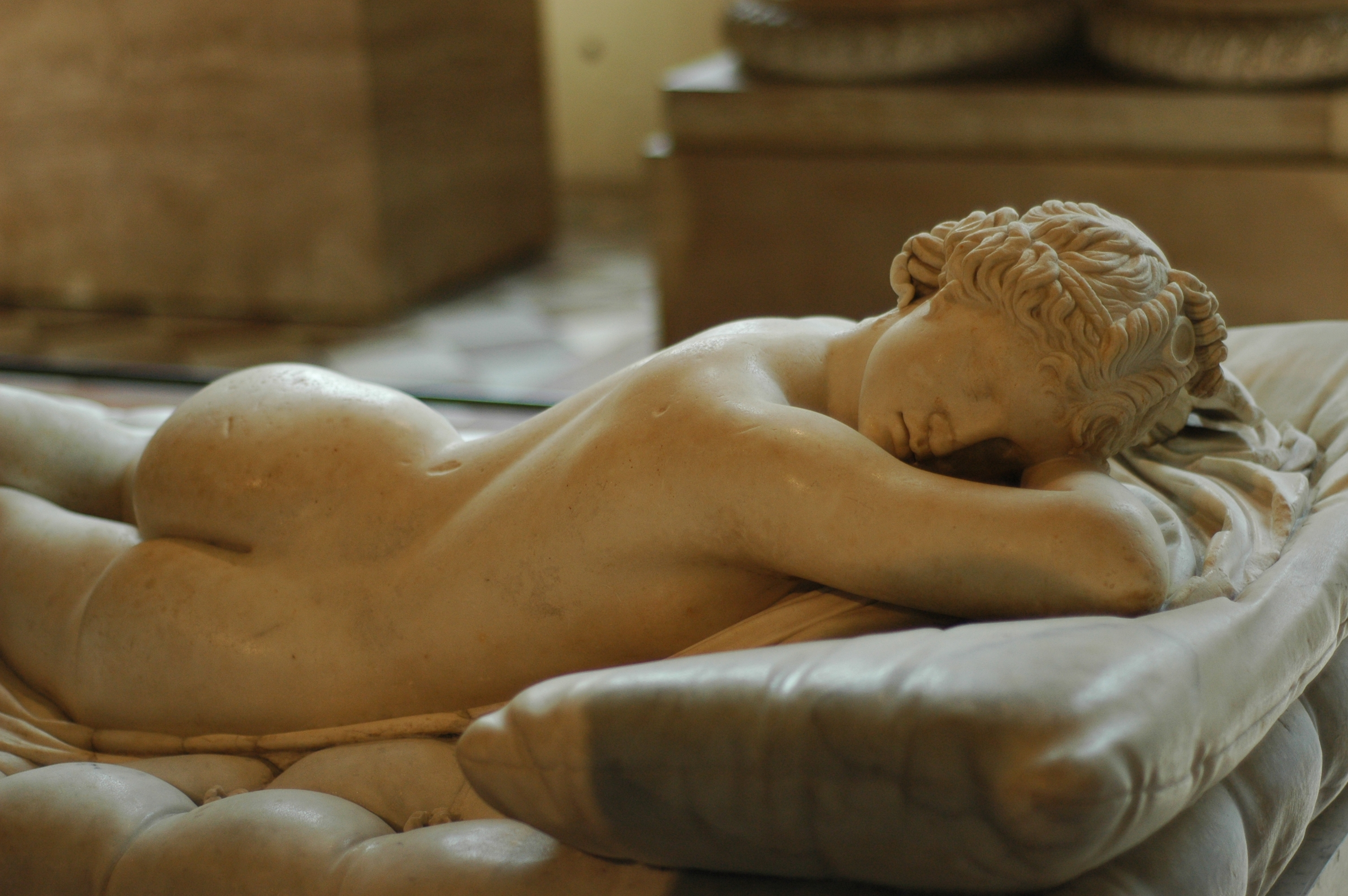
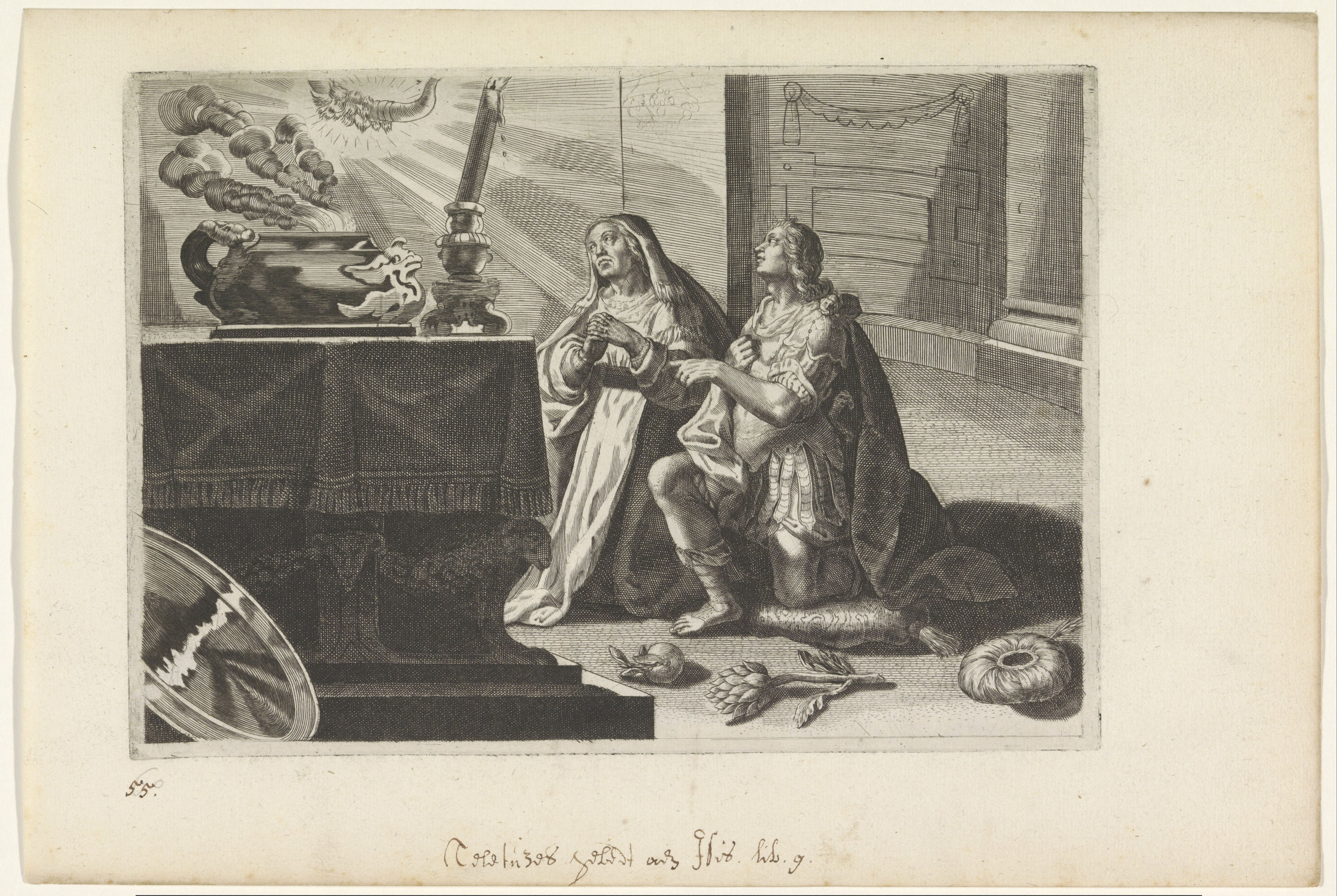
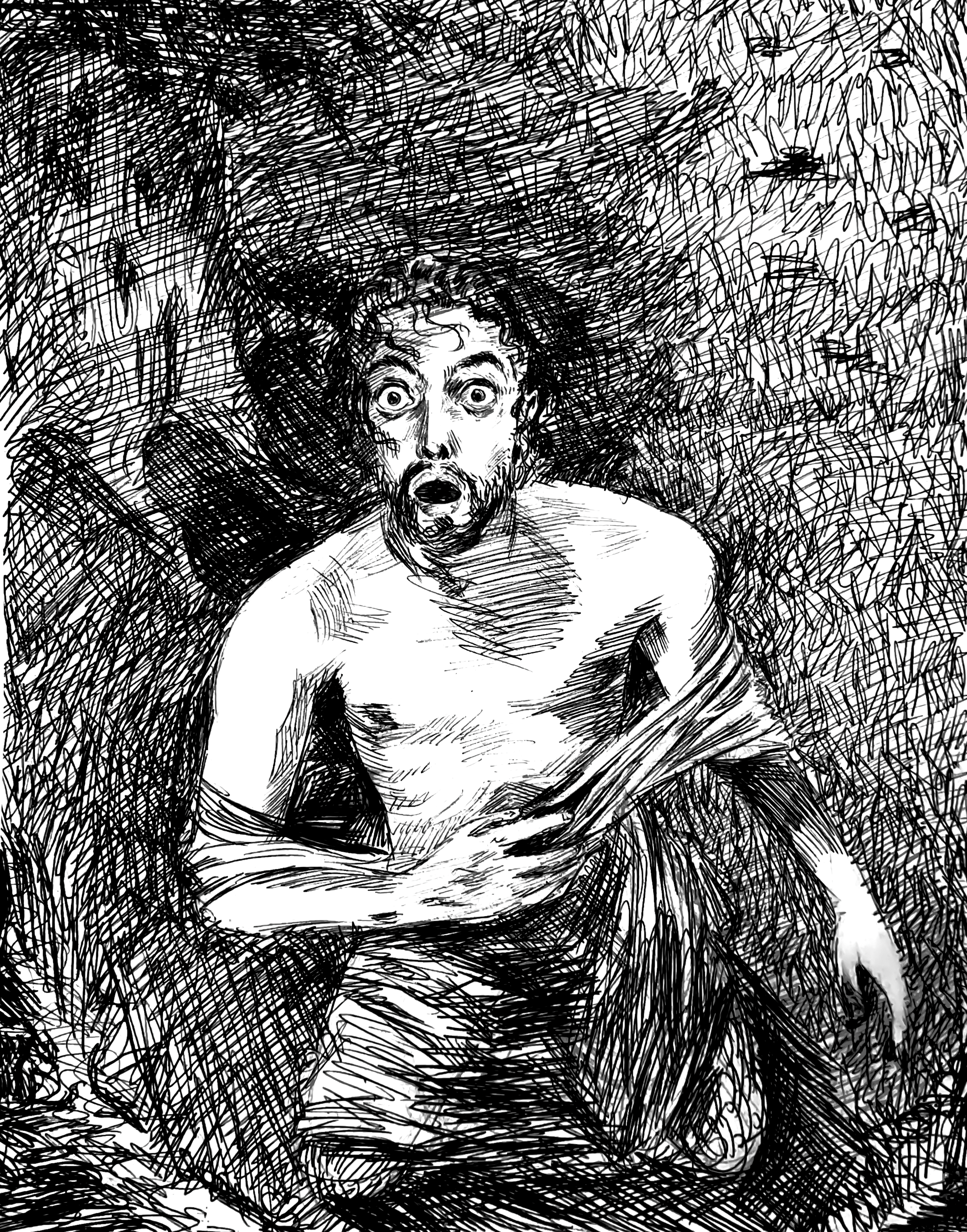
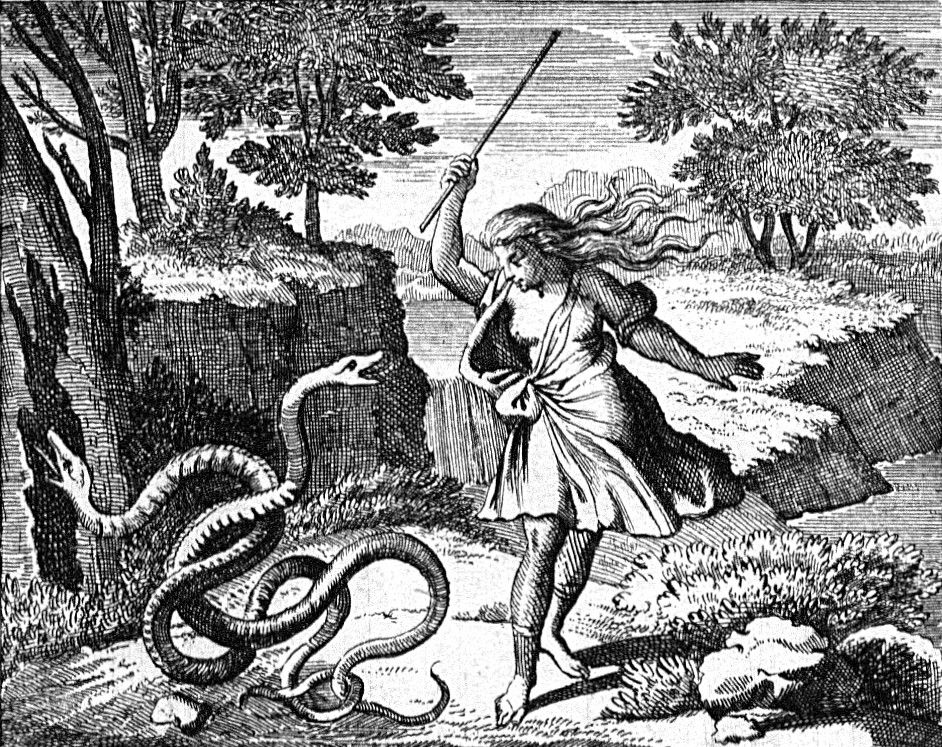
Who?	Into what?	By whom?	Notes	Image
Caenis ("new")	Man	Poseidon	The hero Caeneus was originally a Lapith woman named Caenis who either had sex with or was raped by the sea-god Poseidon, and subsequently asked him to change her into a formidable man. Poseidon fulfilled her wish, and Caenis adopted the name Caeneus thereafter.
Hermaphroditus and Salmacis	Intersex	The gods	Hermaphroditus, originally born a male, the son of Hermes and Aphrodite, was attacked while bathing in a spring by the nymph Salmacis, who had fallen in love with him. As he struggled to escape, she wished that they would be forever together, and the gods then merged the two bodies into one.
Iphis	Man	Isis	Iphis was born to a poor couple, so her father decided that if their unborn child was female, they would kill it. When Iphis was born, her mother lied to her father, gave the child a unisex name and raised her as a boy. When Iphis grew up, she was betrothed to and fell in love with another girl, Ianthe. As the day of the wedding approached, Iphis' desperate mother Telephusa prayed to temple of Isis, who then transformed Iphis into a man, allowing him to marry Ianthe without her ever finding out the truth.
Leucippus ("white stallion")	Man	Leto	Leucippus of Crete, despite the name, was born a girl to a poor couple, Galatea and Lamprus. Galatea, knowing that her husband would expose a female child, lied to him, claiming she had given birth to a son, and raised Leucippus as boy. As Leucippus grew up and the deceit became harder and harder to conceal, Galatea prayed to Leto in her temple, and the goddess in pity transformed Leucippus into an actual male.
Siproites	Woman	Artemis	Siproites was a Cretan hunter who walked into Artemis bathing naked; the goddess then turned him into a woman.
Sithon	Indeterminate	Unclear	A little-known man named Sithon is said to have "became of indeterminate sex, now man, now woman".
Tiresias	Woman then again a man	Hera	The prophet Tiresias once came upon a pair of copulating snakes, he hit the pair with his stick. Hera then turned him into a woman. He spent several years as a woman, until he came upon another pair of snakes. He either left them alone this time, or trampled them, and thus became a man again.

=== Changes in base physical appearance ===
Metamorphoses into monsters and base appearance
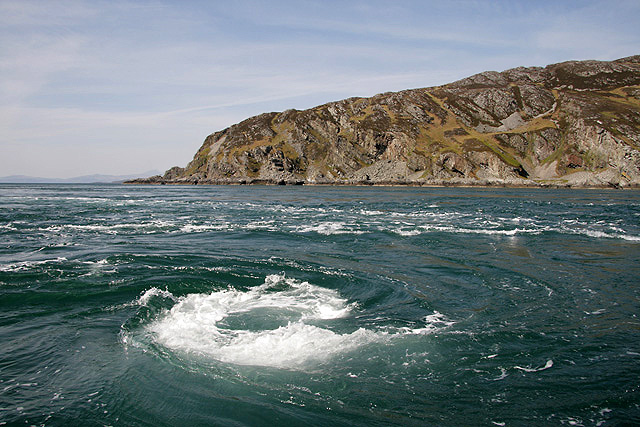
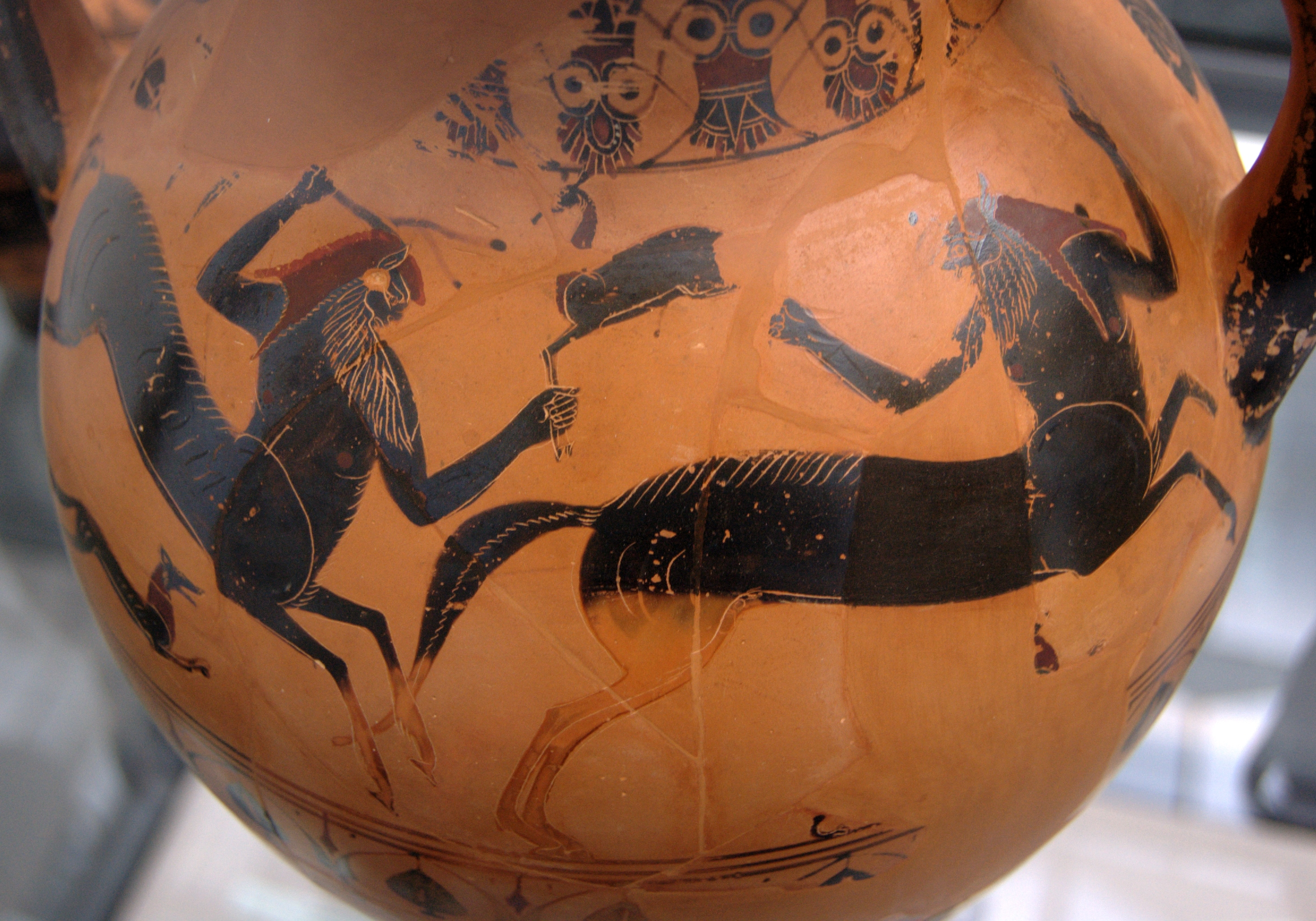
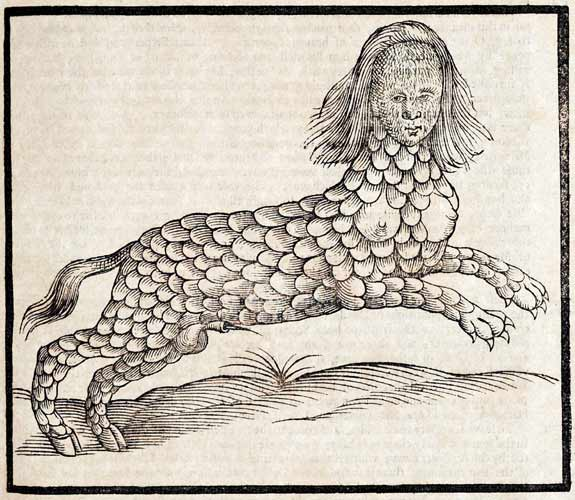
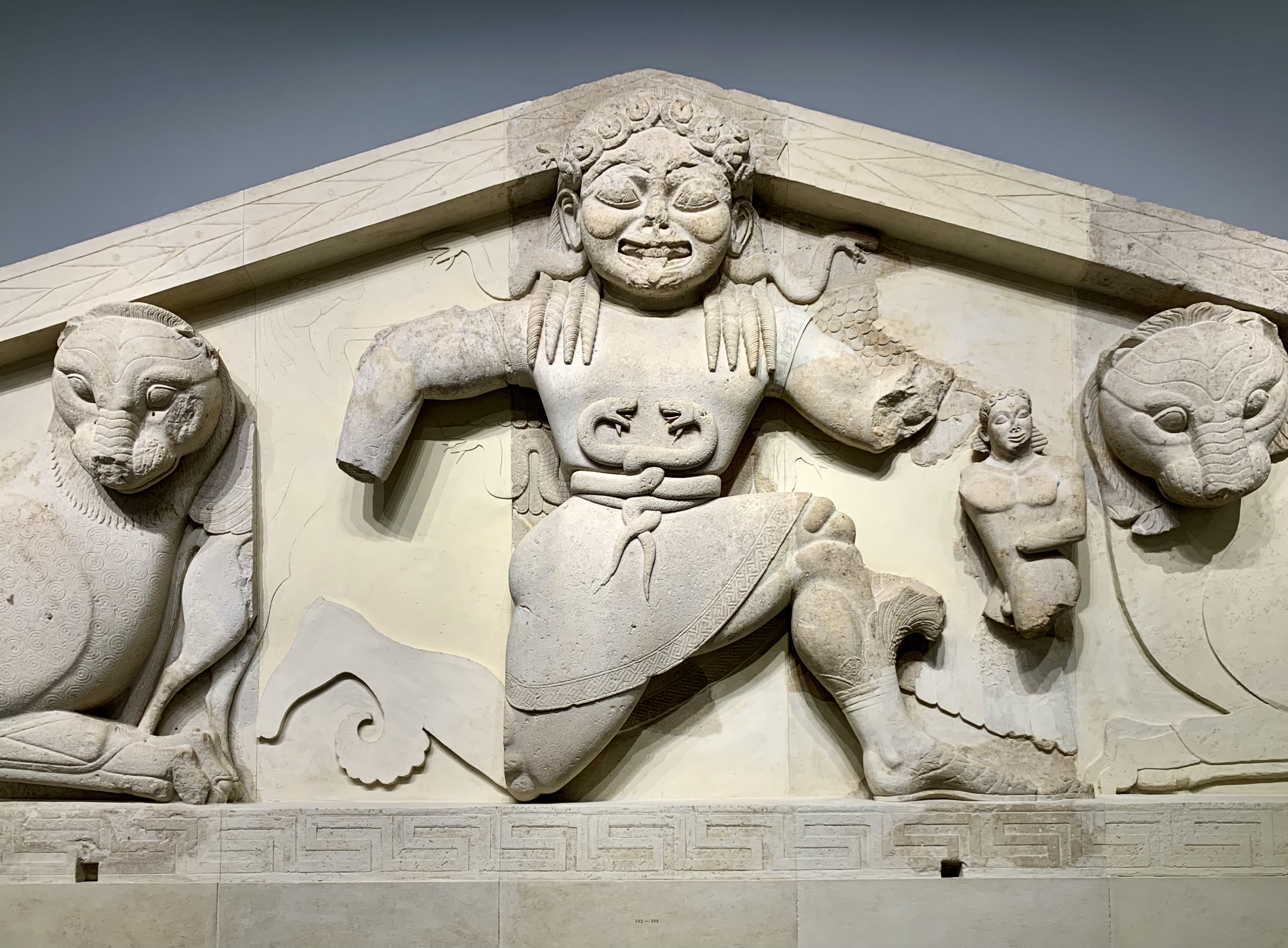
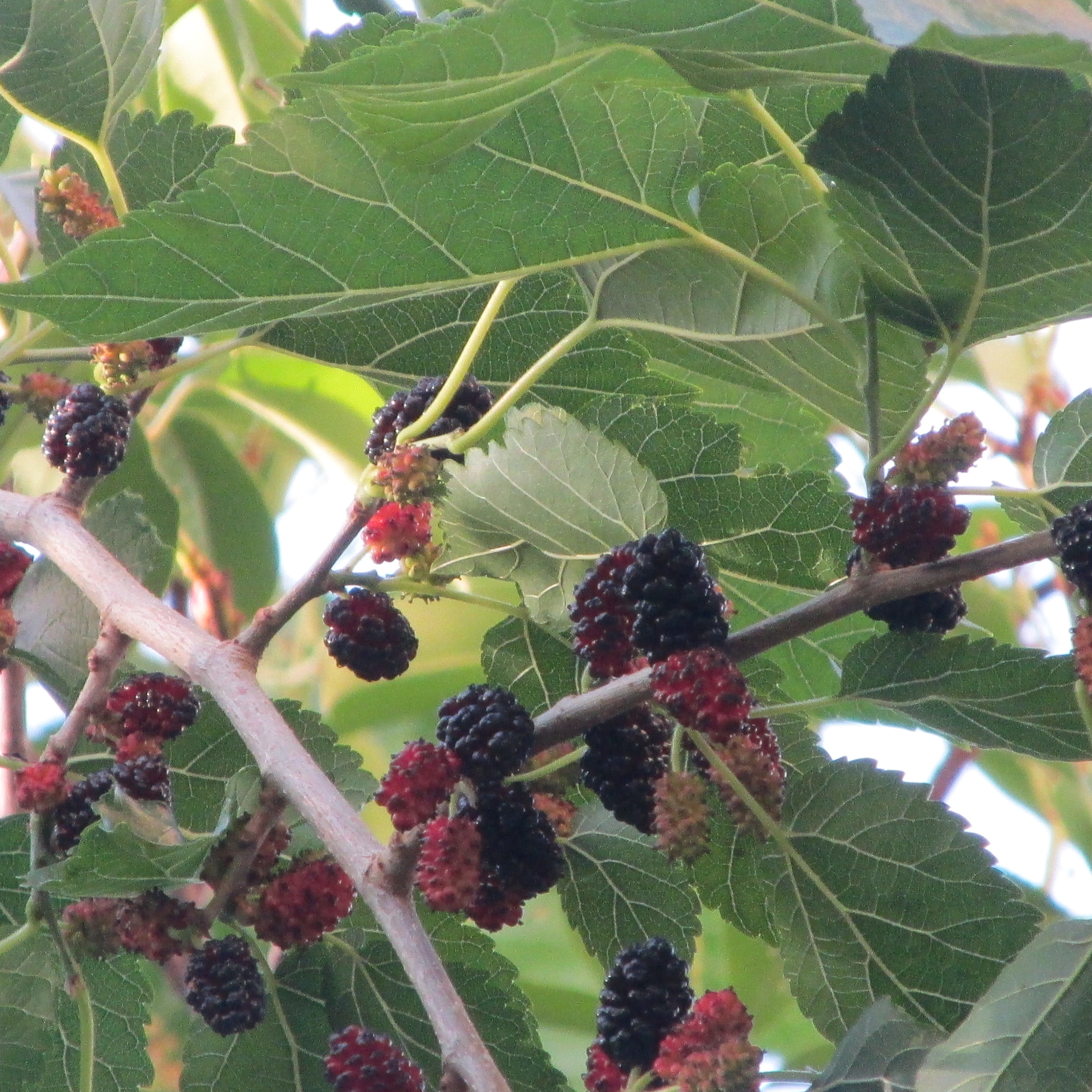
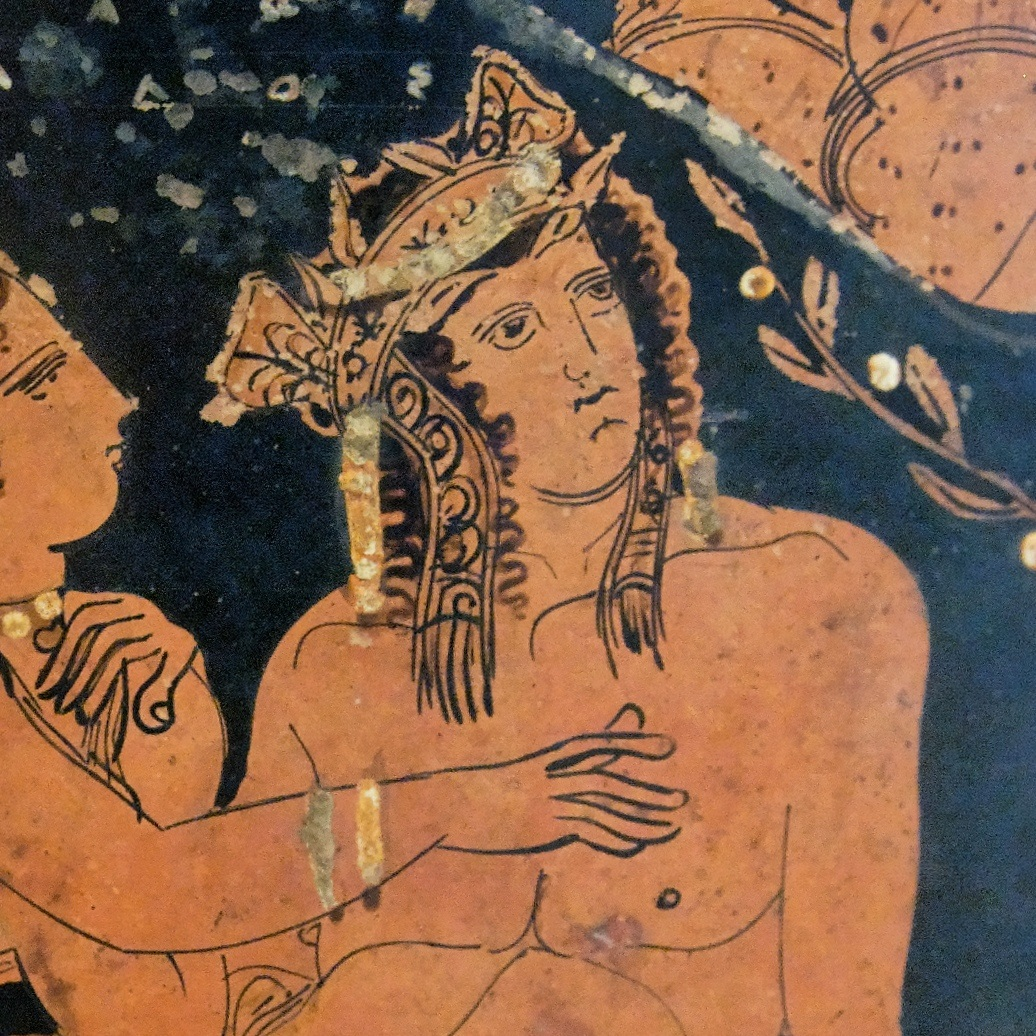
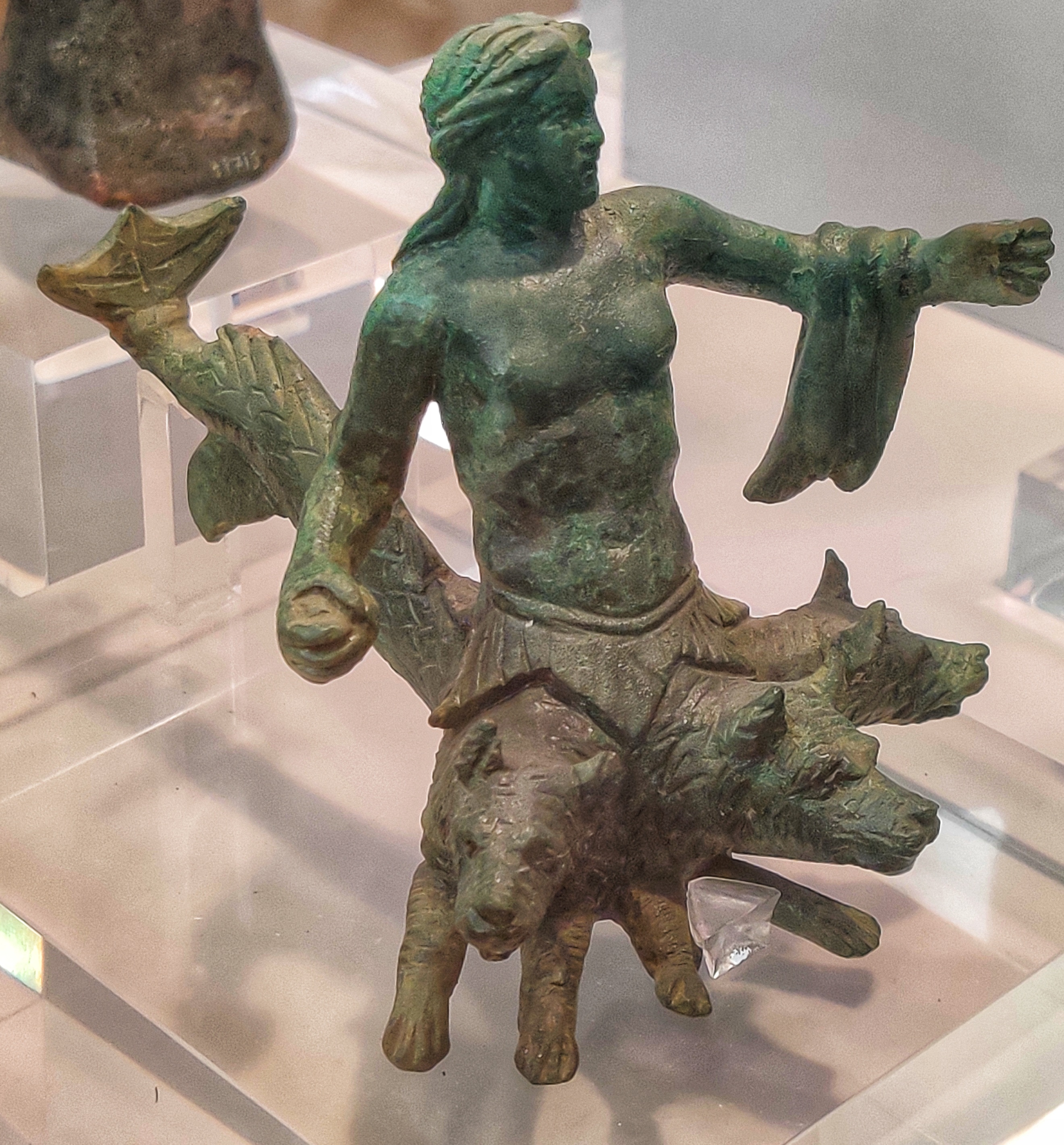
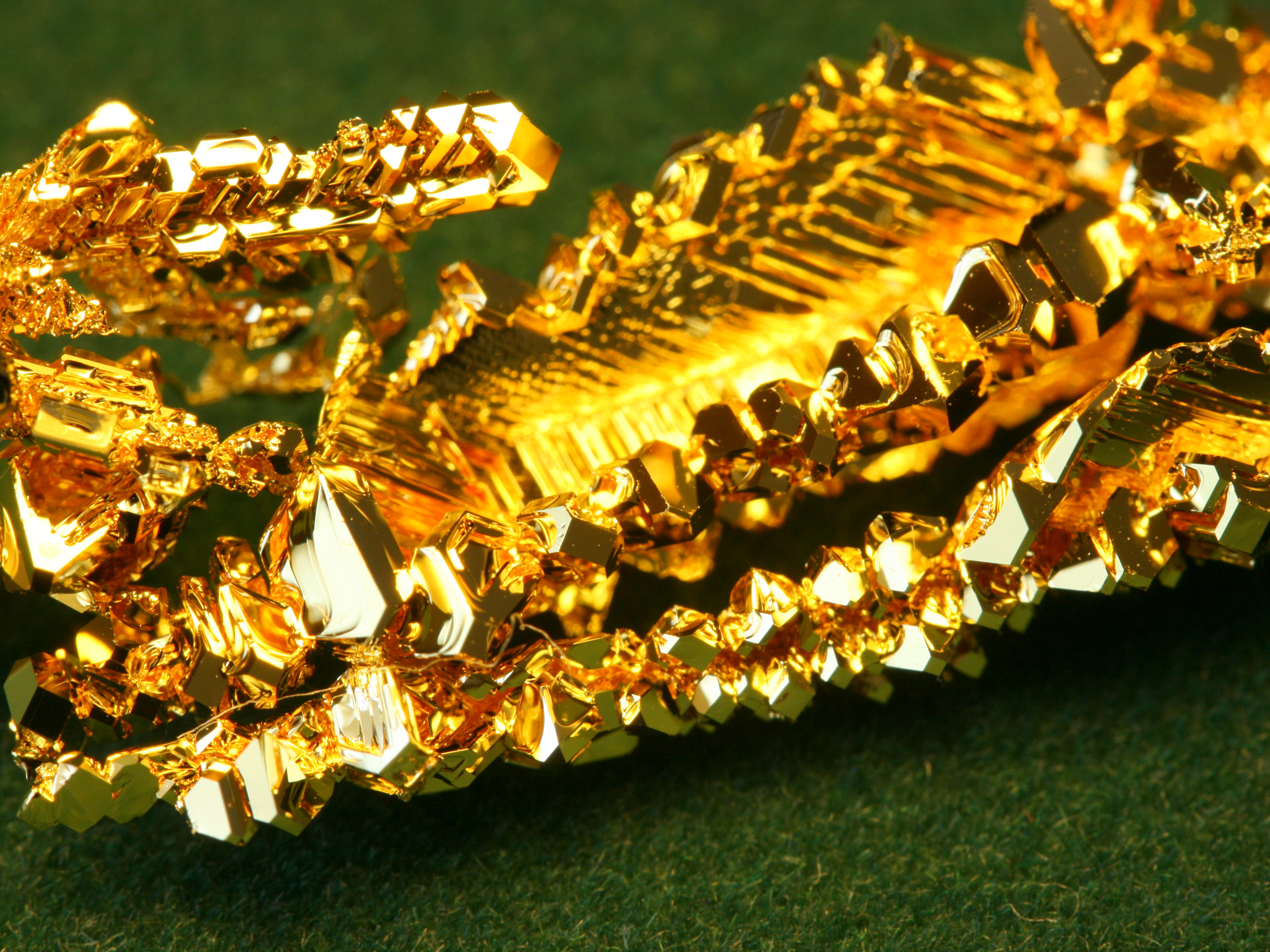
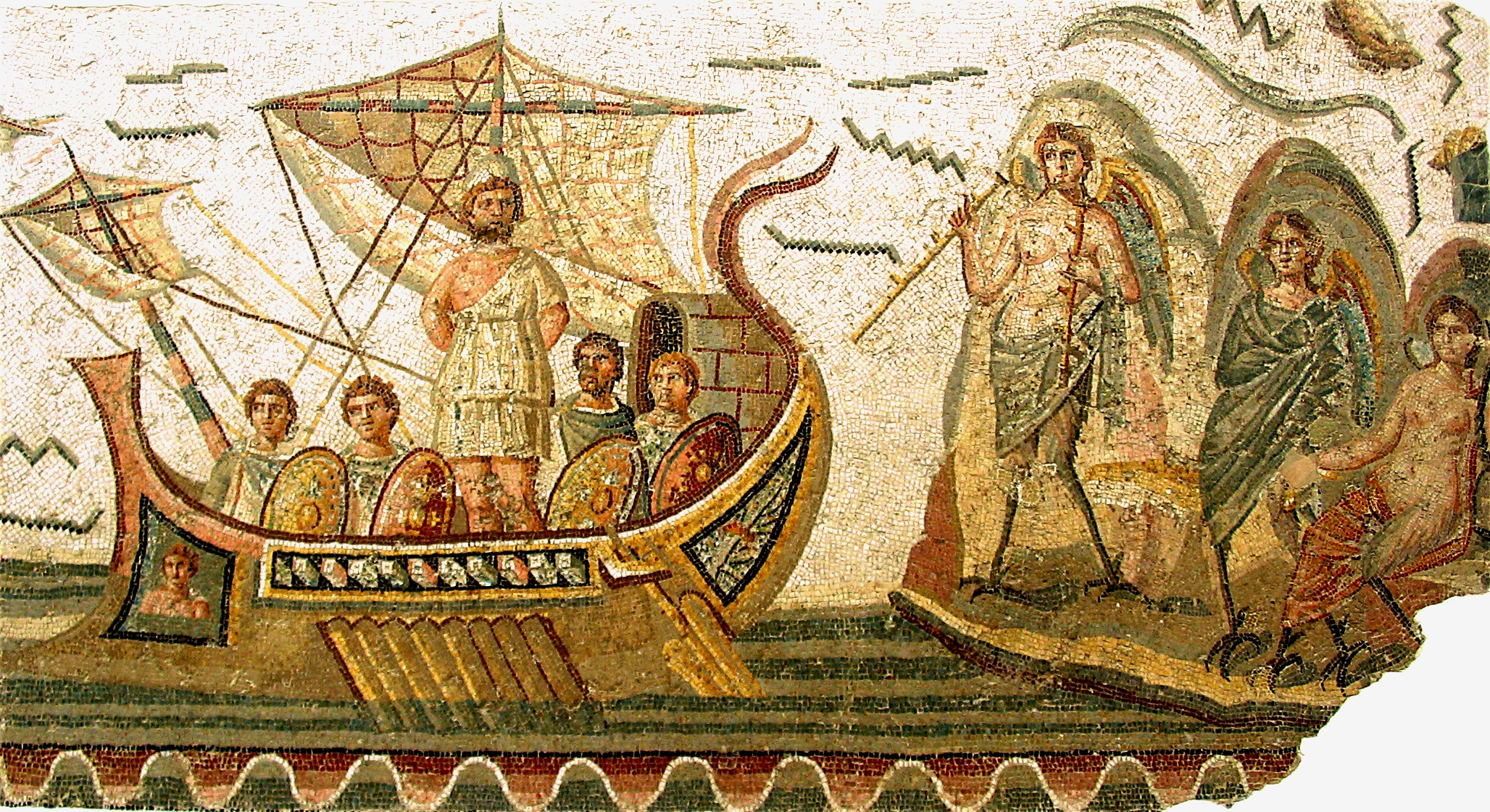
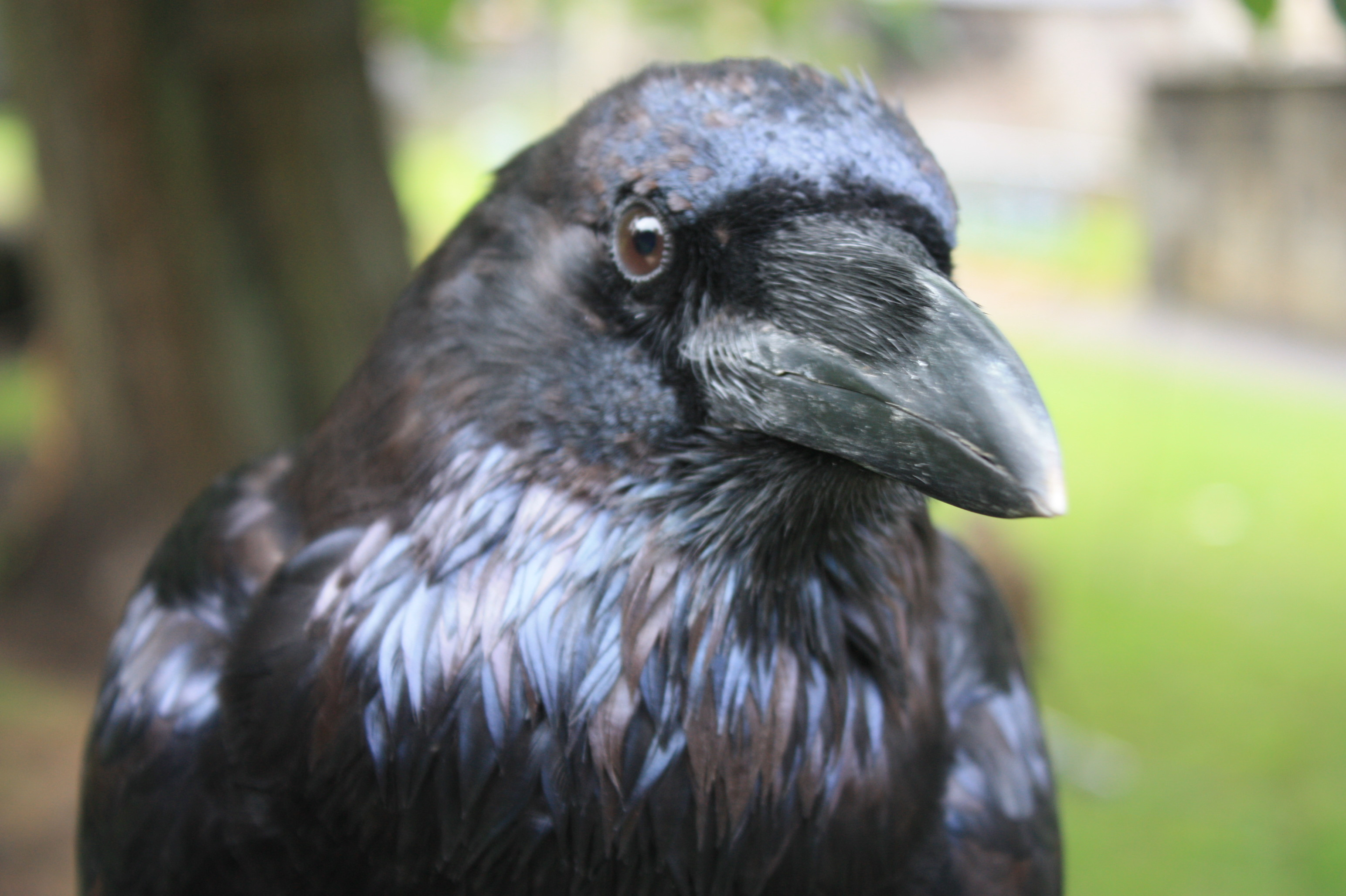
Who?	Into what?	By whom?	Notes	Image
Achilles	An ugly man	Aphrodite	Achilles was an exceedingly beautiful man who entered a beauty contest against Aphrodite. Pan, the judge, deemed Achilles to be the most beautiful, so then Aphrodite cursed him to be as ugly as he had once been attractive.
Antigone	Snake-haired woman	Hera	Antigone boasted of being prettier than Hera, so the goddess gave her snakes for hair.
Boat	Stone	Apollo	After Pompilus saved Ocyrhoe from Apollo by transporting her to a nearby island, Apollo appeared again, stole Ocyrhoe, turned Pompilus into fish and his boat into stone.
Charybdis	A sea monster	Zeus	In some accounts, Charybdis was originally a woman whom Zeus turned into a sea water-swallowing monster when she sided with her father Poseidon over some dispute.
Dionysus's guardians	Centaurs of the Lamus	Hera	The sons of some Lamian Naiad nymphs of Cilicia were tasked with guarding the young Dionysus by Zeus, until Hera caught sight of him and punished his guardians by transforming them into some creatures, that in spite of being called Centaurs, are described as man-shaped with ox horns and horse tails. (Note: As William Rouse himself notes, where Nonnus heard of this class of 'Centaurs' remains a mystery.)
Lamia	A blind, child-snatching monster	Hera	Lamia was one of the many lovers of the god Zeus. When Hera discovered the affair, she caused Lamia to kill her own children, and then transformed her into a malformed creature that preyed on people's children, snatching and then killing them.
Medusa	A snake-haired monster	Athena	According to Ovid, Medusa was originally a beautiful maiden who was raped by Poseidon inside one of Athena's temples. Athena, enraged, turned the girl's hair into snakes, and in due time she would help Perseus slay her.
Mulberry's white fruit	Dark red	None	In the most known version of Pyramus and Thisbe, they did not transform into bodies of water, but instead Pyramus's blood stained the (previously white) fruit of a mulberry dark red, and they remained so thereafter, reminding everyone of the couple's tragic fate.
Phaon	A handsome man	Aphrodite	Phaon was an old and ugly boatman from Lesbos who ferried Aphrodite (disguised as an old woman) from Lesbos across to the coast of Asia Minor without asking for payment. In gratitude she gave him a box of ointment, and when he rubbed it on his face, he became young and attractive.
Scylla	A dog-tailed monster	Circe or Amphitrite	According to some authors, Circe turned the beautiful Scylla into a monster by poisoning the waters she used to bathe in because the sea-god Glaucus rejected her in favour of Scylla; according to others Amphitrite, the queen of the sea, was the one to curse her due to Scylla becoming mistress to Poseidon.
Several things	Gold	Midas	After Midas acquired the power to turn everything into gold from Dionysus, his touch turned a number of objects into gold, be it his clothes or his food or even water. Eventually Midas begged Dionysus to take back his gift lest Midas died of starvation, unable to consume golden food.
Sirens	Snatching birds with women's heads	Demeter	According to some late accounts, the Sirens were the daughters of the Muse Melpomene and the river god Spercheus. When Hades abducted Persephone, they failed to save the girl. In her rage, Persephone's mother Demeter turned them into winged creatures.
White raven	A black one	Apollo	Clinis' son Lycius, now a raven with a white plumage, informed Apollo that his pregnant lover Coronis had been unfaithful to him. In rage, Apollo turned the white raven into a black one, and proceeded to murder Coronis.

=== Miscellaneous ===
Miscellaneous metamorphoses
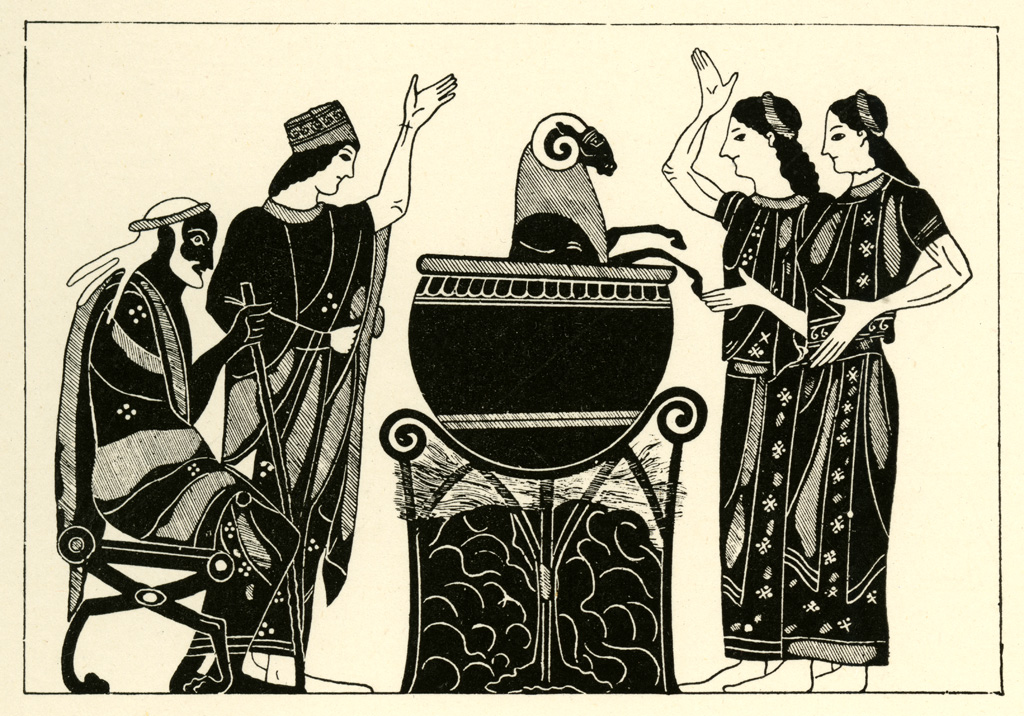
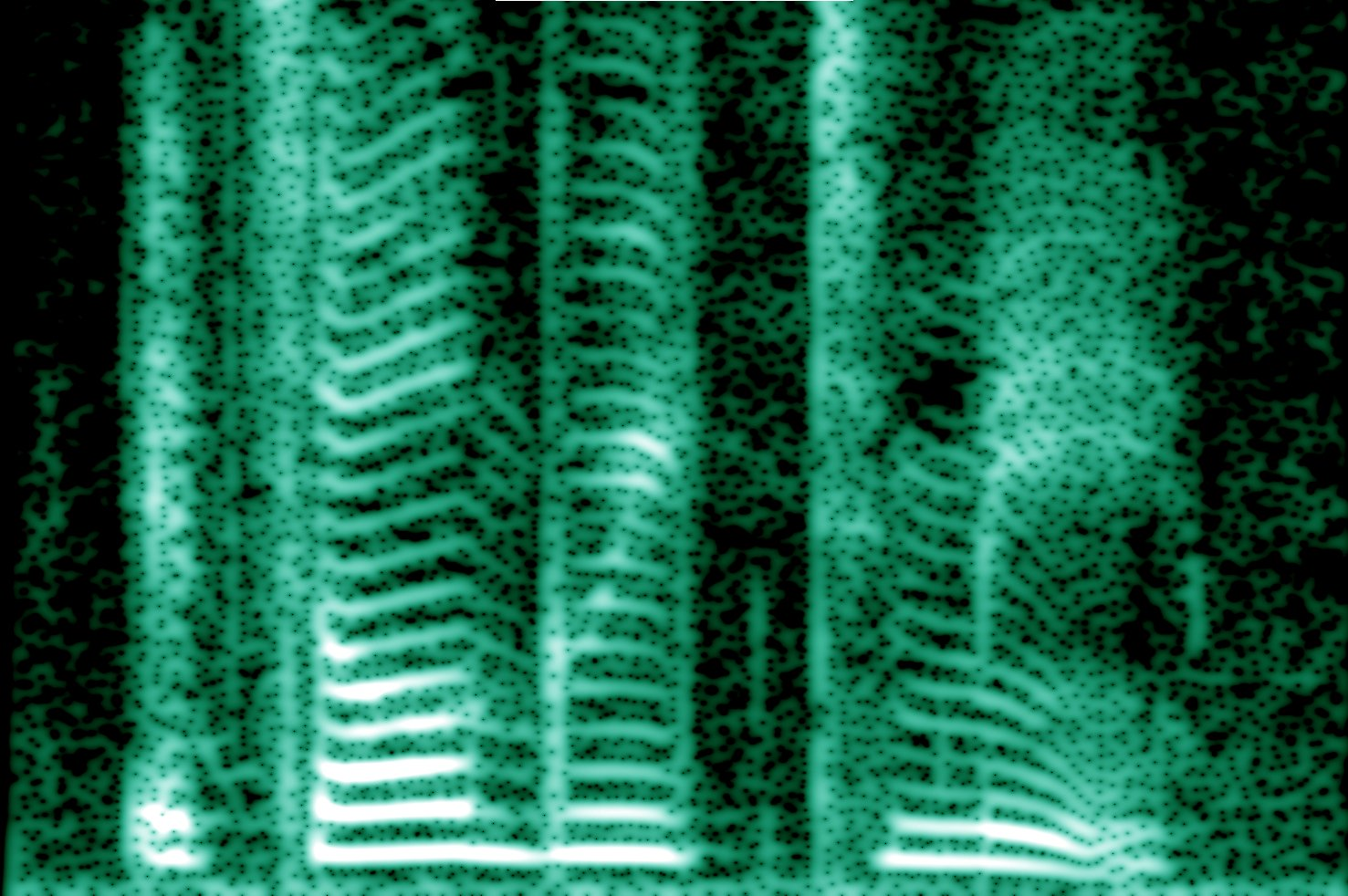
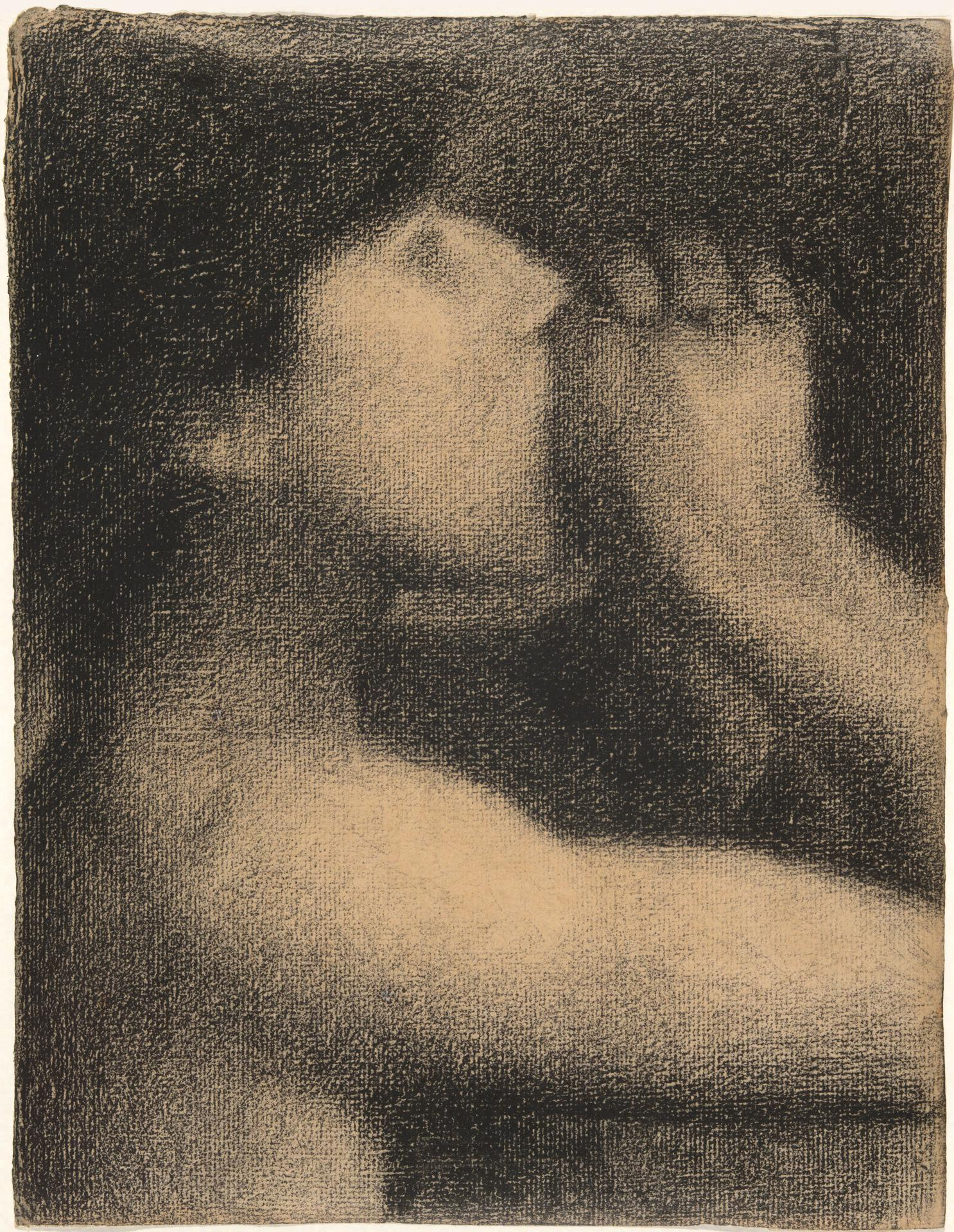
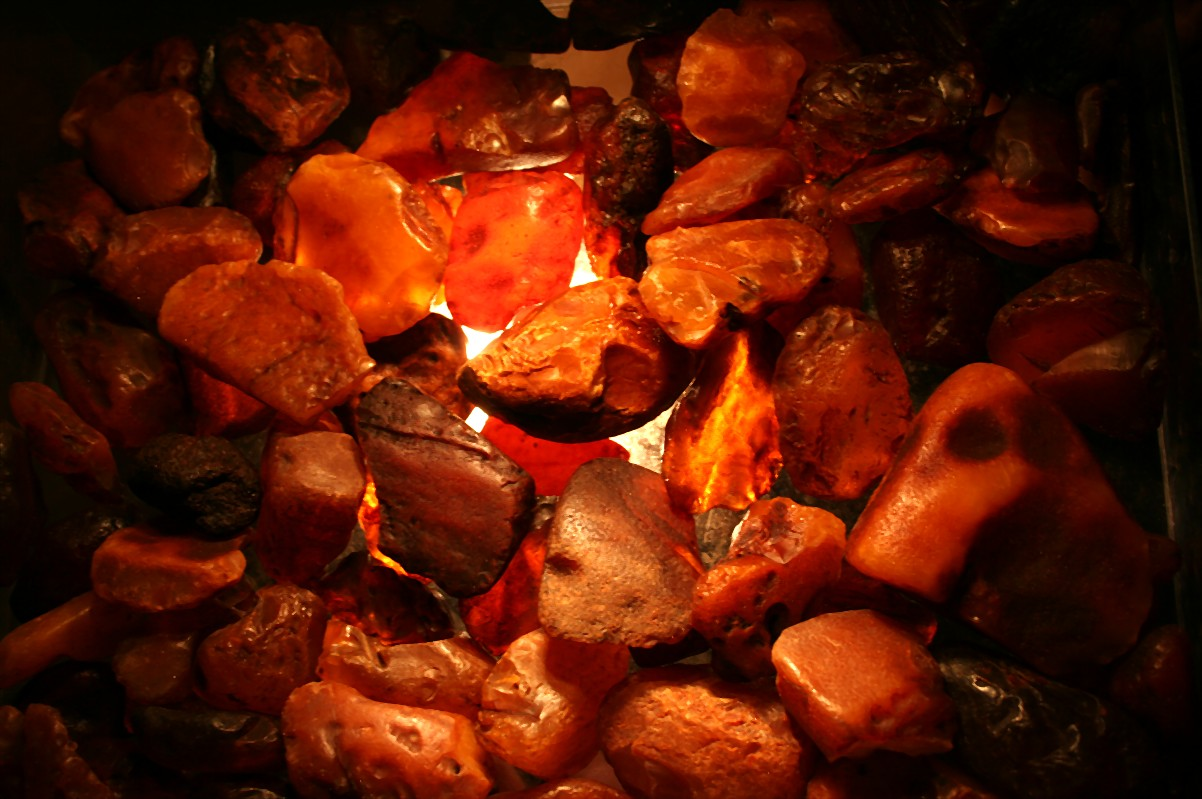
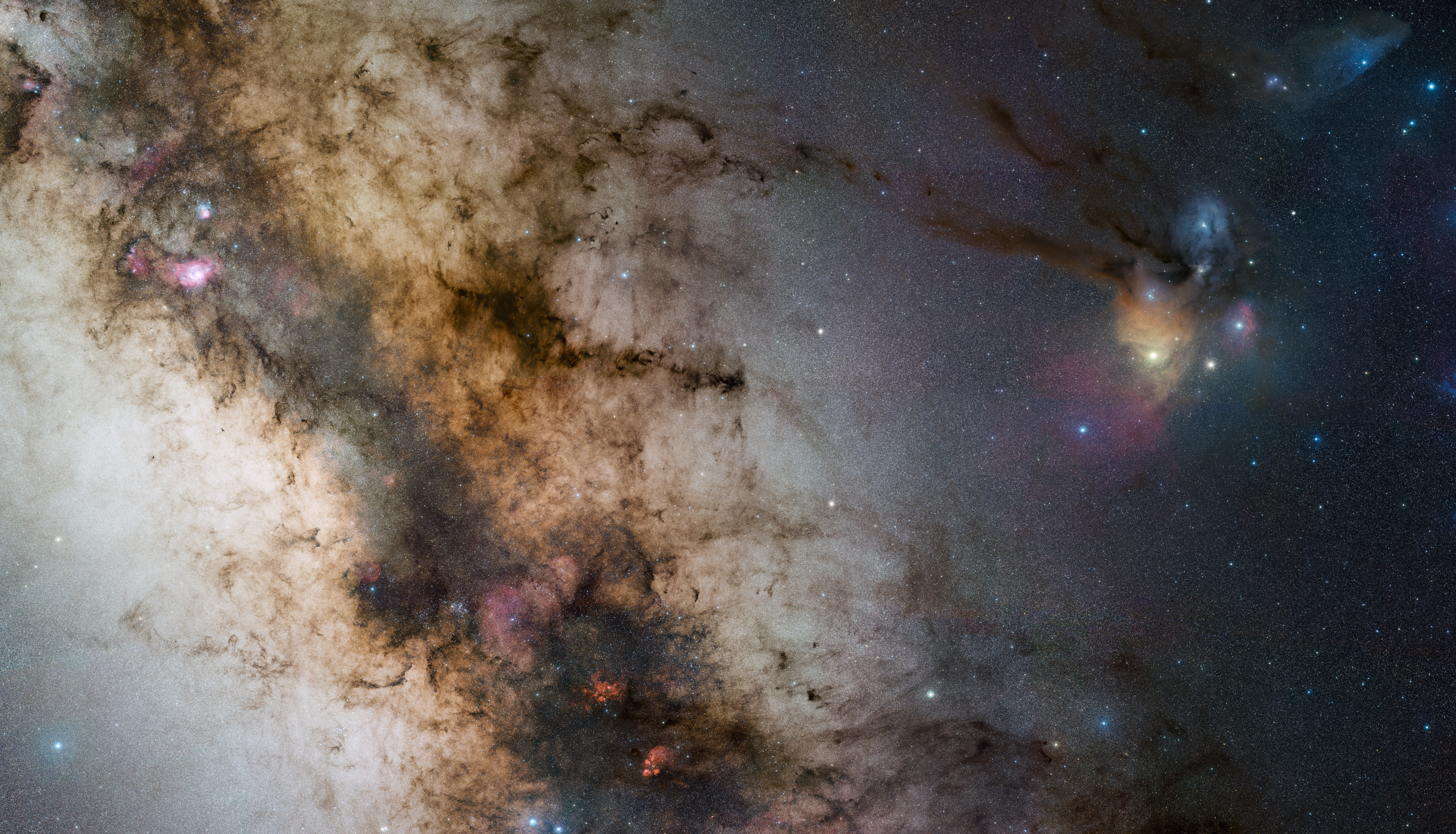
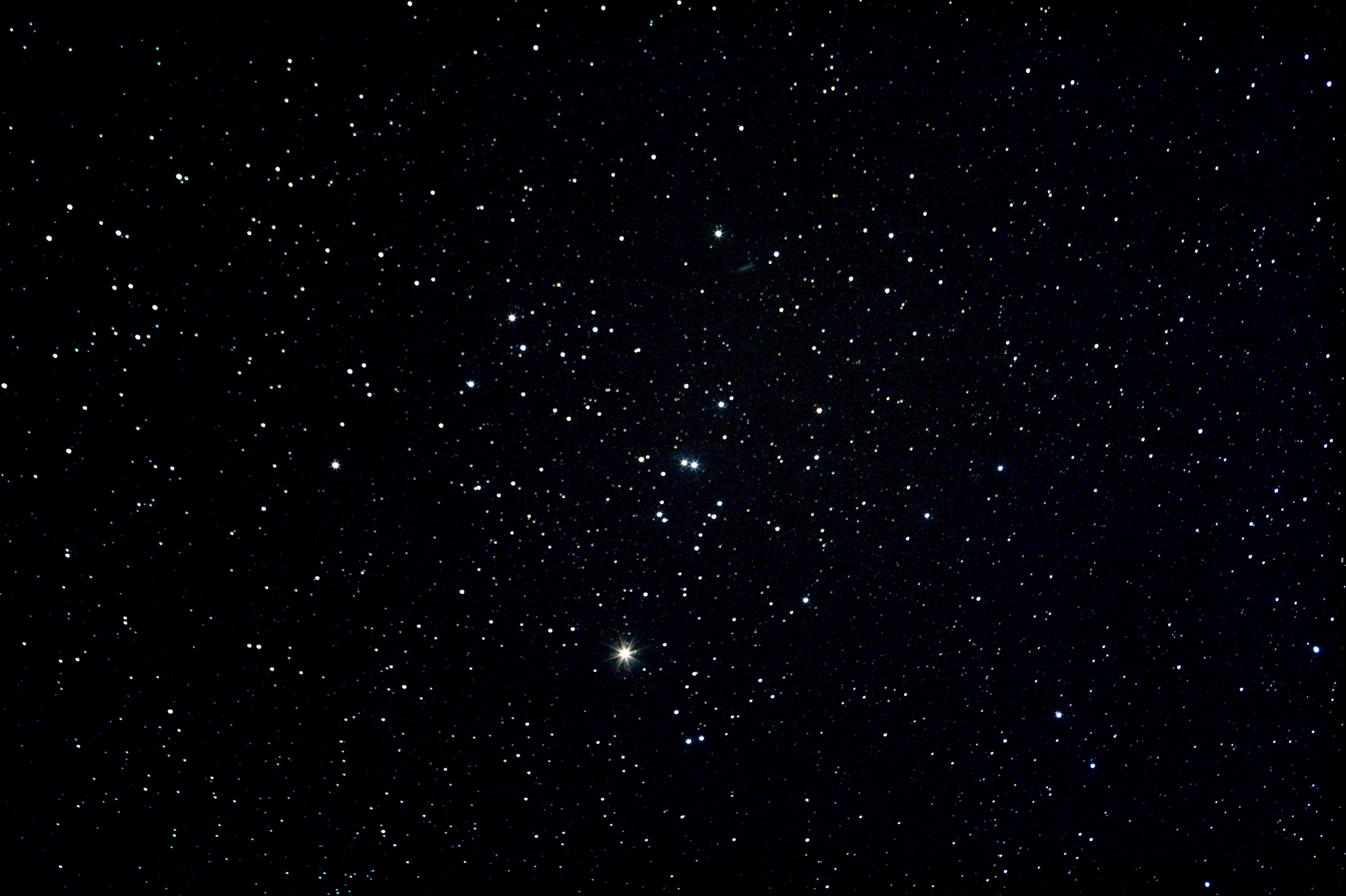
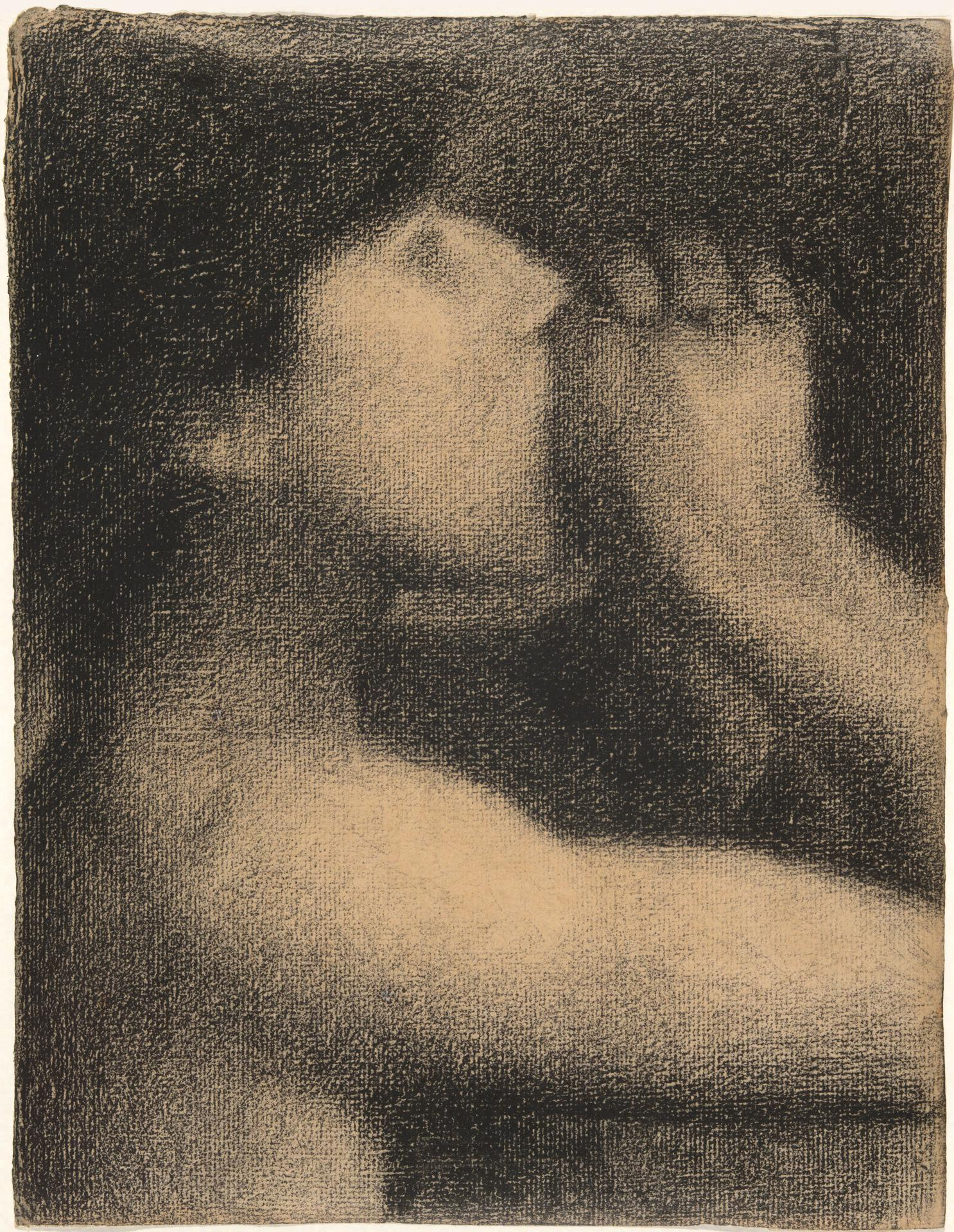
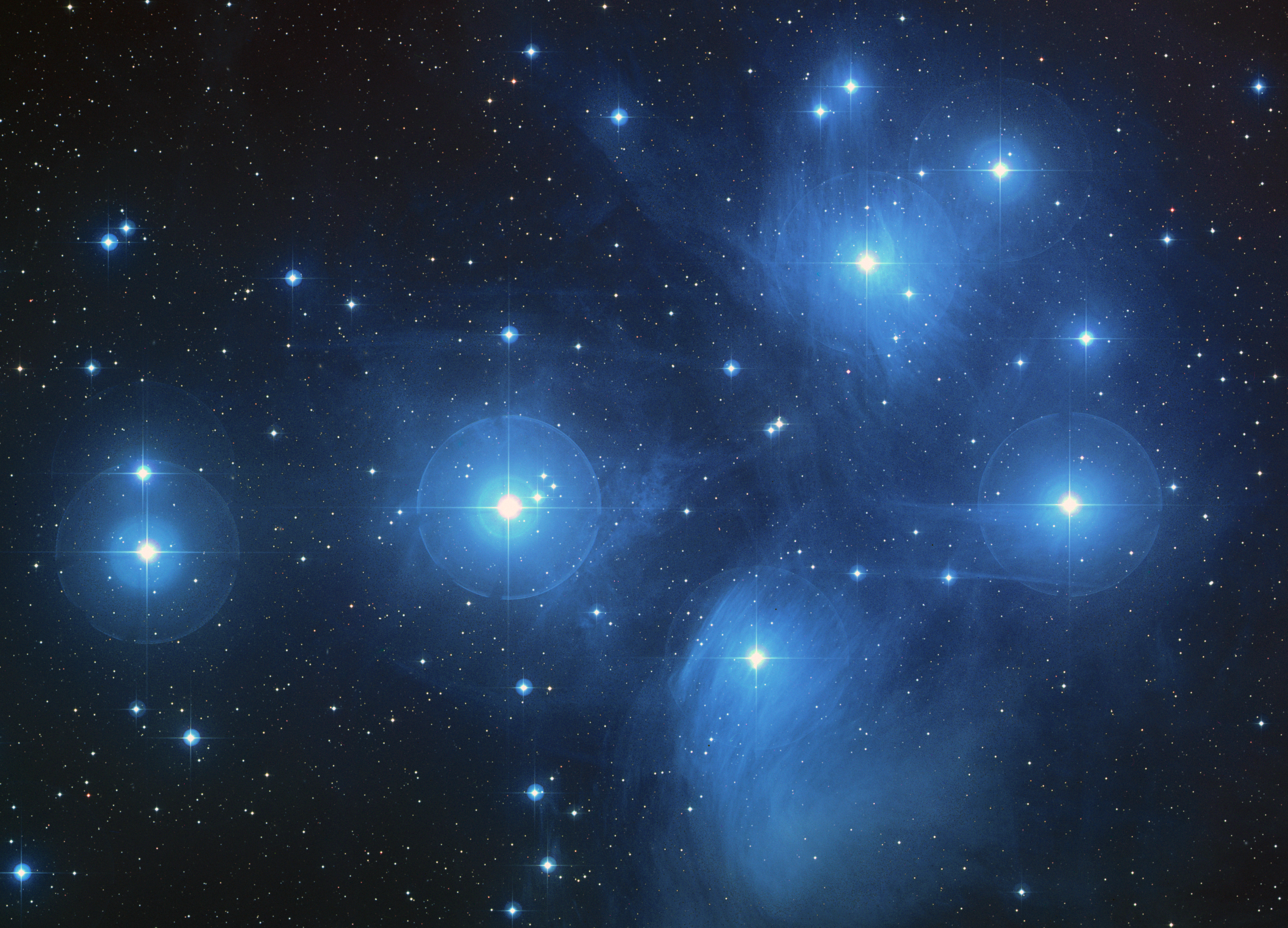
Who?	Into what?	By whom?	Notes	Image
Aging ram	A young one	Medea	When Jason and Medea returned to Iolcus, Medea deceived Pelias's daughters with a magic trick. She cut down an old ram and threw it into a boiling cauldron, thereupon a young ram jumped out. The Peliades unsuccessfully tried to do the same trick on their father.
Cumaean Sibyl	Voice	None	Sibyl promised Apollo her affections if he gave her as many years of life as the grains of sand she held in her arms. Apollo granted her wish, but Sibyl rejected him. The sibyl lived for a very long time but without eternal youth so she aged and shrank and became helpless. In the end only her voice remained of her.
Echo	Echo	None	Depending on version, Echo was a nymph who either was cursed by Hera to only repeat conversations and then fell in love with the vain Narcissus, or attracted the envy of Pan due to her musical talent and her chastity. Nothing but her echoing voice, named after her, was left after she withered away. Depending on version, this happened either when Narcissus rejected her and left her heartbroken, or the men that Pan sent against her out of anger tore her apart. Thus, this way Echo keeps repeating the last words she hears for all eternity.
Heliades's tears	Amber	None	After the death of their brother Phaethon, the Heliades shed bitter tears, which hardened into amber.
Hera's milk	Milky Way galaxy	None	When Hera breastfeeded the infant Heracles, without knowing his true identity, some of her divine milk spilt, either because Heracles bit her or because she chucked him away when she realized who he was. Her milk then became the galaxy with all its stars and planets.
Hyades	Hyades stars	Zeus	The Hyades were so inconsolable after the death of their brother Hyas that they were turned into a star cluster. In some versions Zeus did so as gratitude for protecting his infant son Dionysus.
Hylas	Echo	The nymphs	Hylas joined the Argonauts in their search for the golden fleece. While journeying on the Argo, he was abducted by some nymphs who fell in love with his good looks. Although his companion Heracles sought for him far and wide, Hylas disappeared from the face of the earth and was never found again. In some versions, the nymphs kept him with them forever, but in others they transformed him into echo instead, so his agonizing shouts for help were the only thing left of him.
Pleiades	Pleiades (stars)	Zeus	The Pleiades (Maia, Electra, Alcyone, Celaeno, Taygete, Sterope, Merope) were pursued by the hunter Orion. After years of non-stop chasing, Zeus pitied them and transformed them into a star cluster, the Pleiades, also known as the Seven Sisters.

=== Voluntary transformations ===
Mischellaneous
Who?	Into what?	By whom?	Notes
Greek gods	Anything	Themselves	Most, if not all, Greek gods and goddesses have the ability to alter their appearance at will and then change back. Gods who exercise this ability in written stories include Zeus, Demeter, Hera, Poseidon, Athena, Ares, Aphrodite, Hermes, Apollo, Artemis, Dionysus, Hephaestus, Helios, Leto, Eros, Pan, Asteria, Heracles, Cronus, Rhea, Thetis, Psamathe, Nereus, Proteus, Nike, Sosipolis, Nemesis, Boreas and Melinoë.
Kobalos	Anything	Themselves	The kobalos is a sort of mischievous sprite, a companion of Dionysus, which loved to play tricks on people and terrify mortals with its shapeshifting abilities.
Mestra	Anything	Themselves	A mortal woman who was given the ability to change her shape at will by Poseidon, her lover. Mestra used her gift to sell herself and then escape many times, in order to buy her ever hungry father some food.
Periclymenus	Anything	Themselves	A mortal son of Poseidon who was granted the gift of voluntary transformation by his father.

== Falsely claimed as Greek mythology ==
Throughout the eons, several made up and unattested stories involving Greek mythological characters and Greek mythological motives have been passed as genuine Greek myths and beliefs and attributed to various ancient Greek and Roman writers, despite having no basis in Greek mythology and being attested in no ancient Greek or Latin texts. Those do not correspond to ancient beliefs and their origins can be traced in post-antiquity and modern times.

Fakeloric metamorphoses
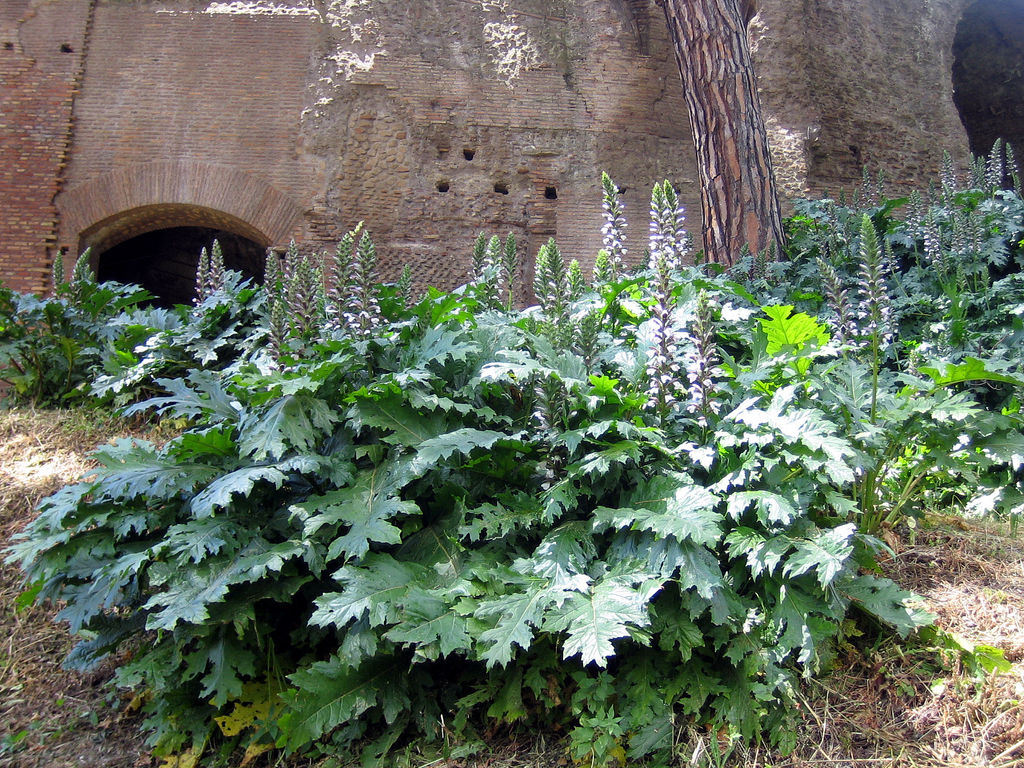
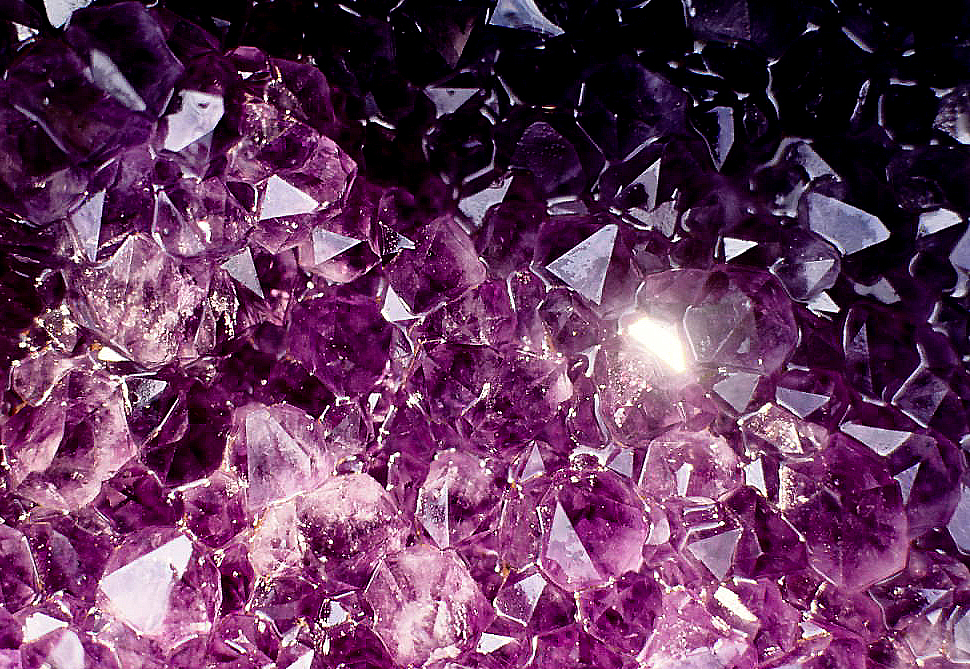
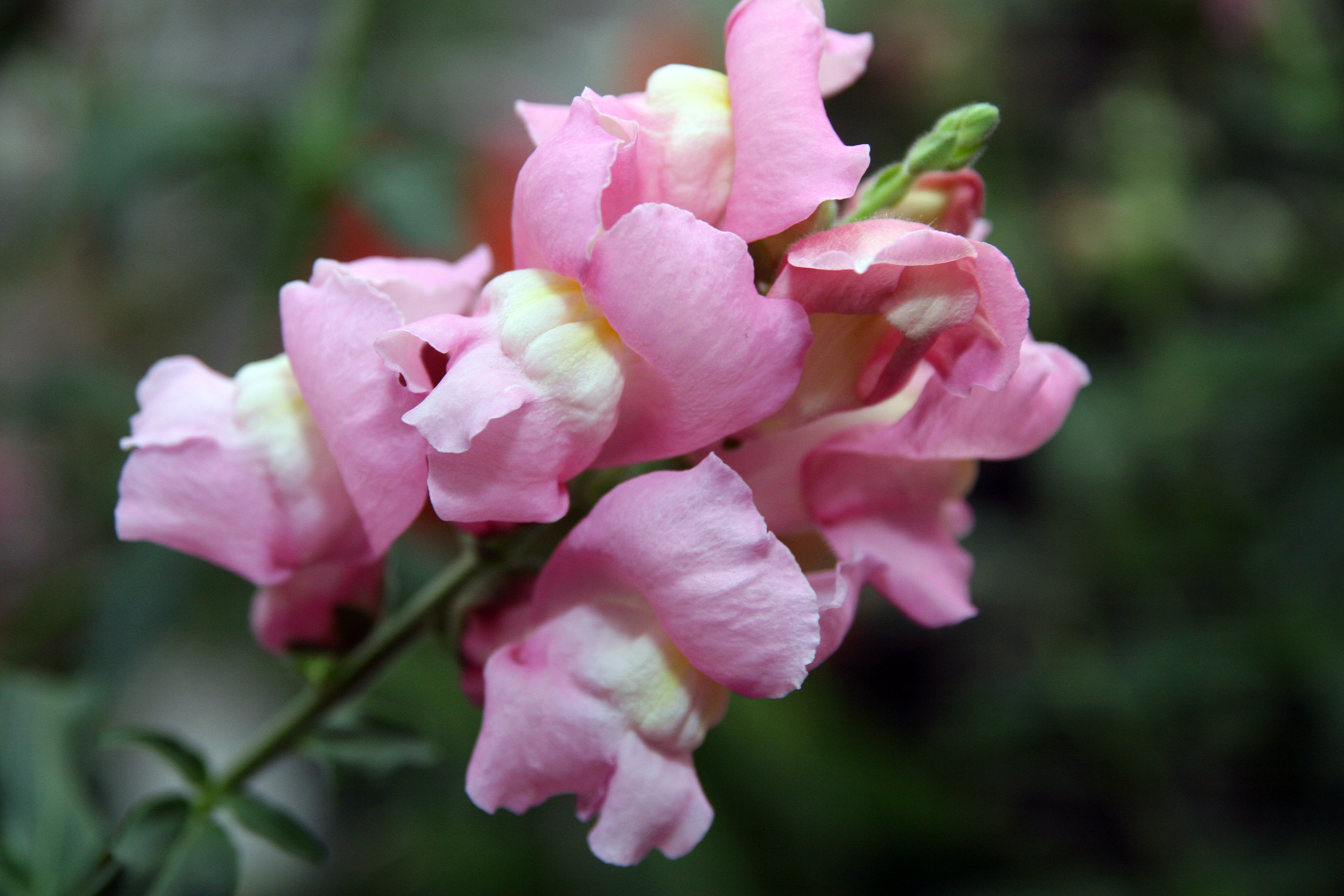
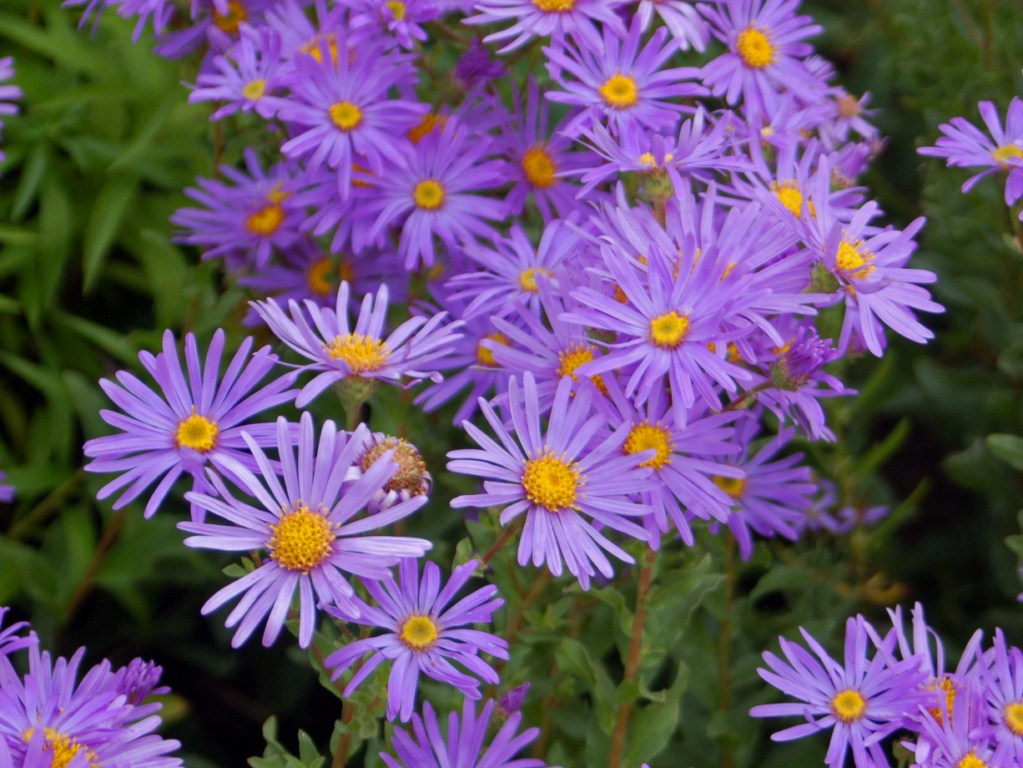
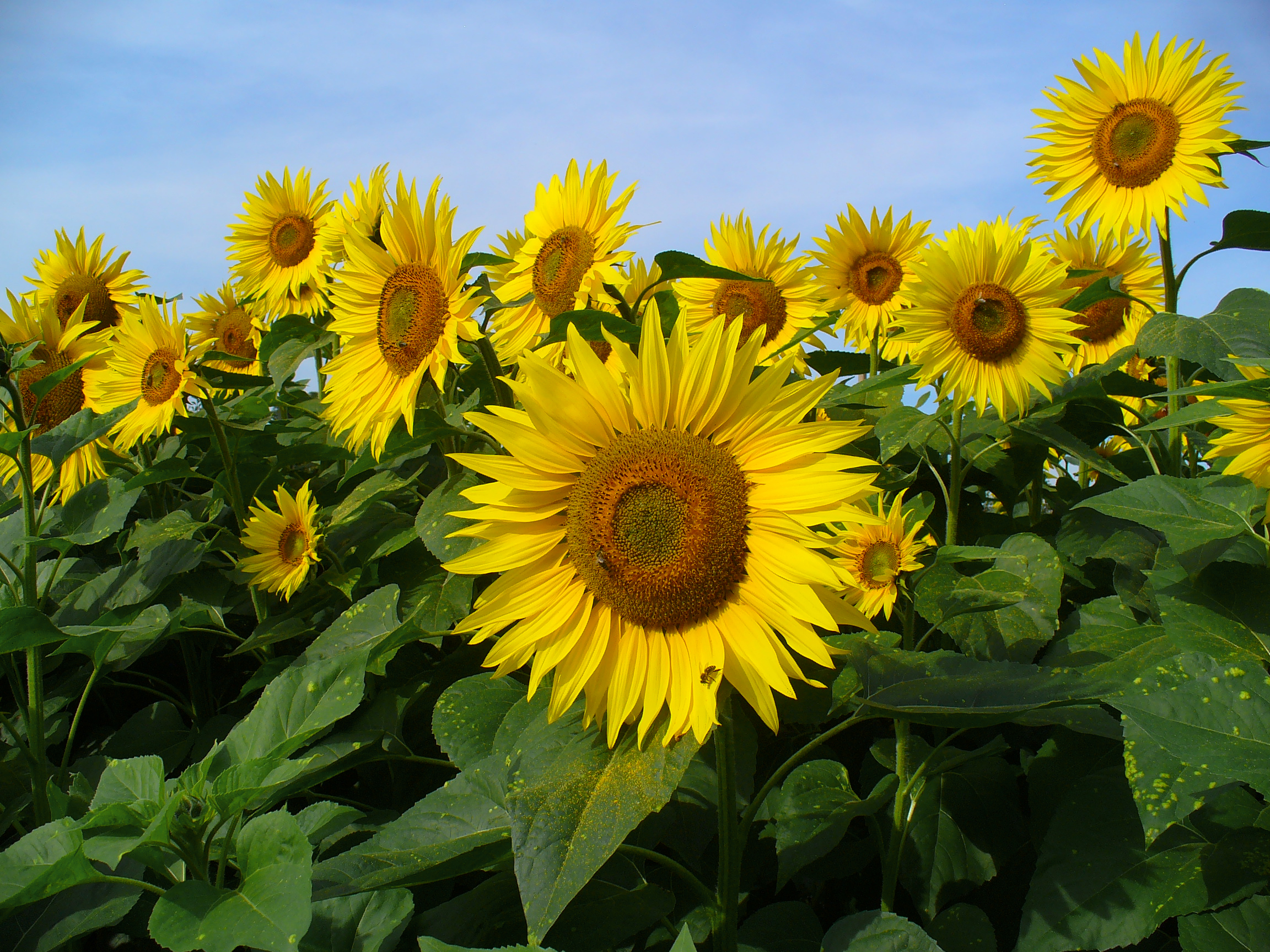
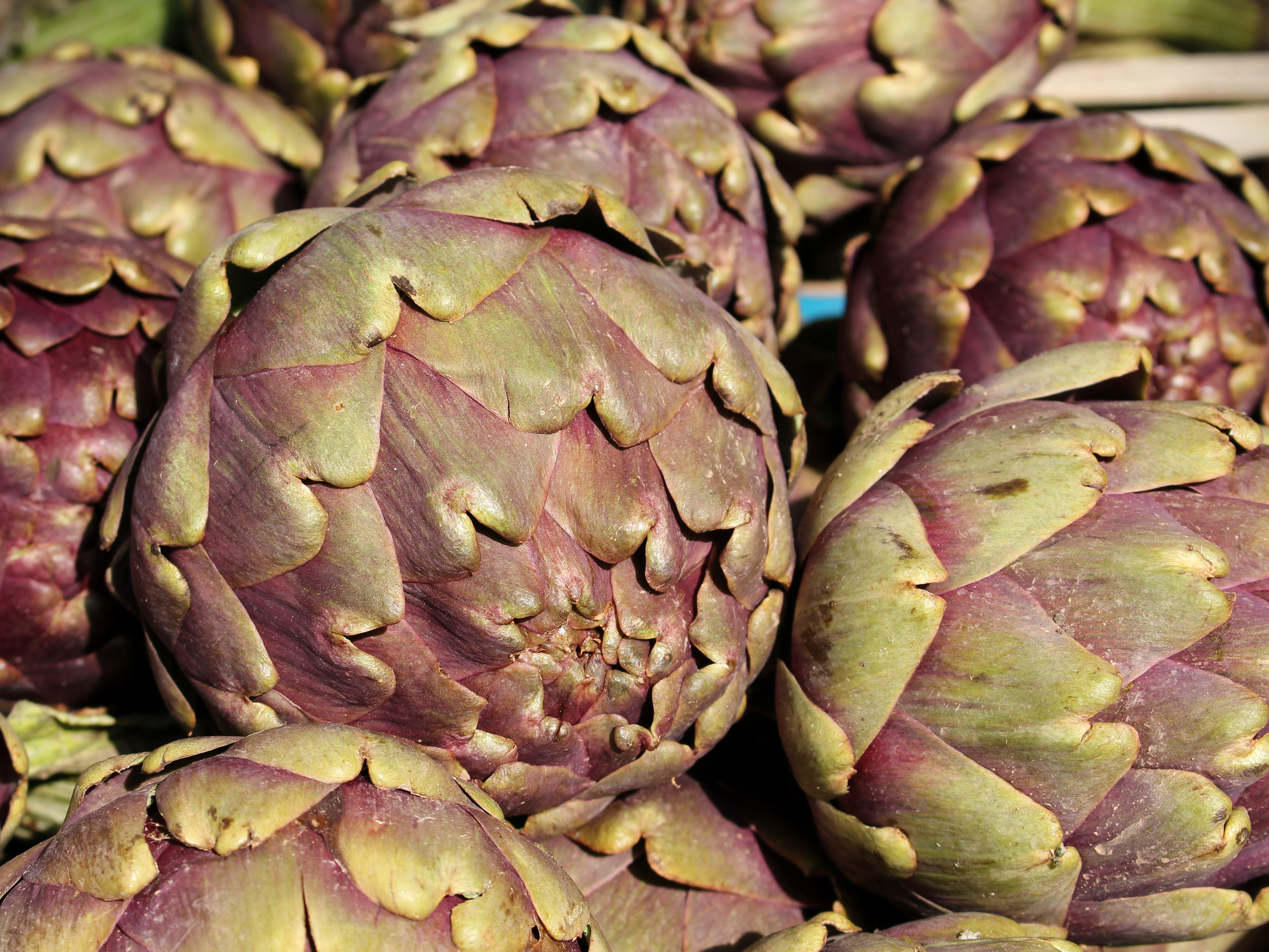
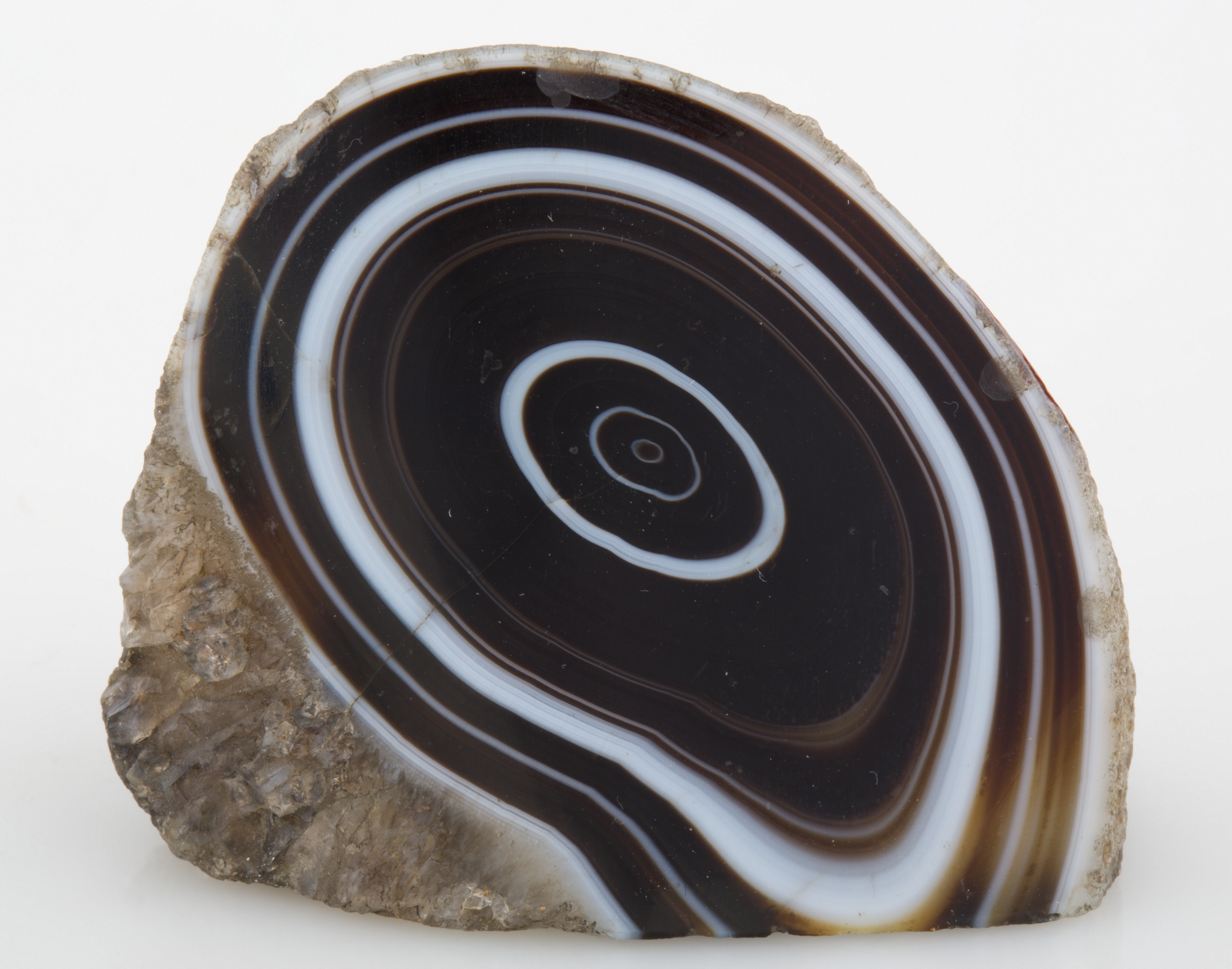
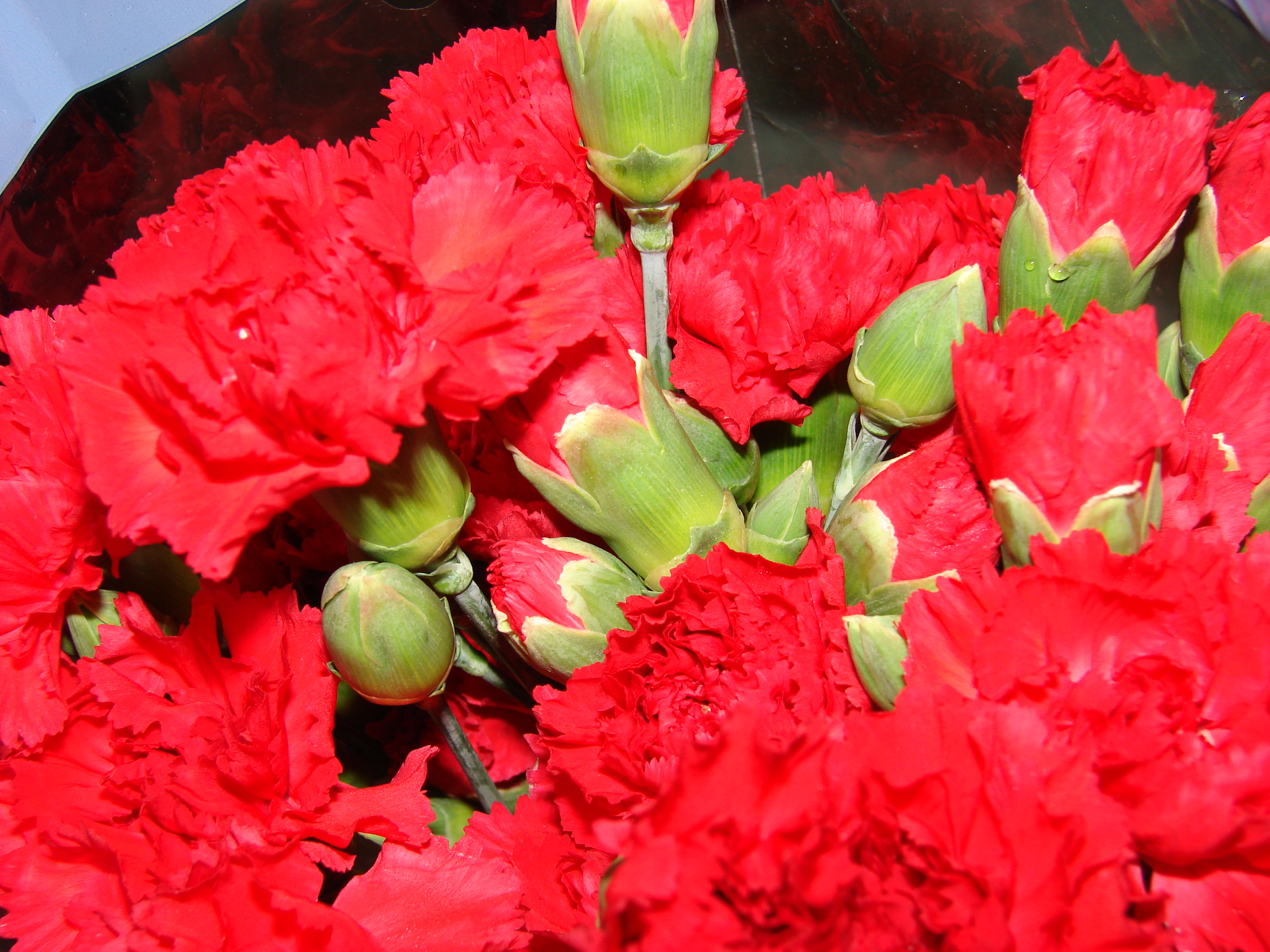
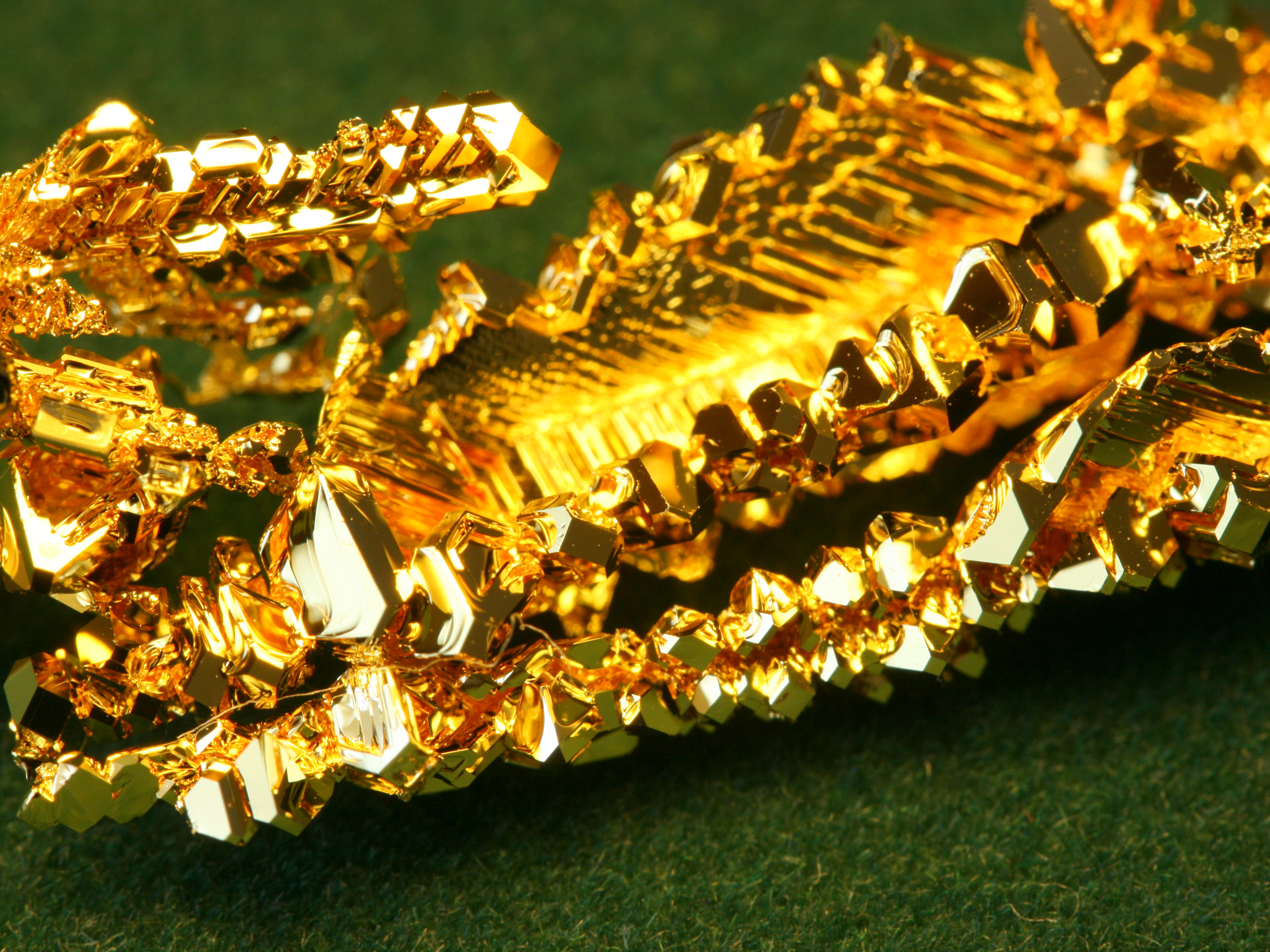
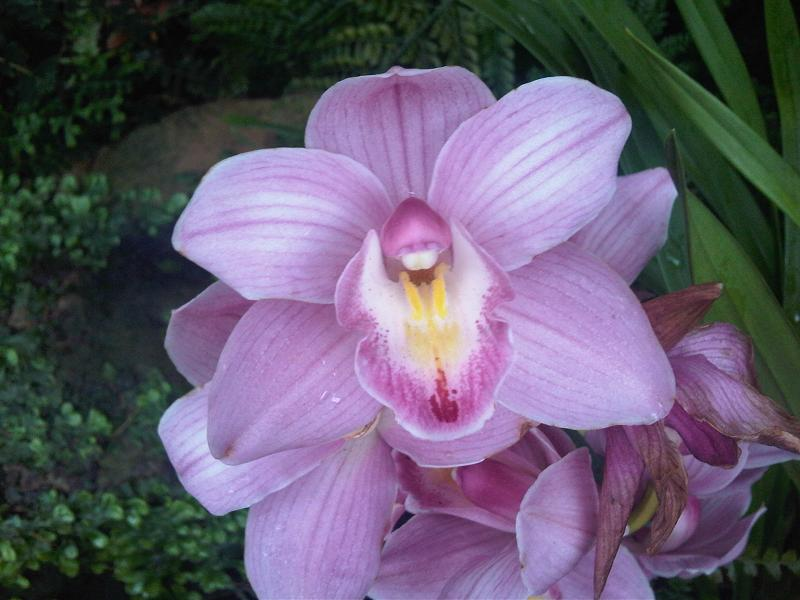
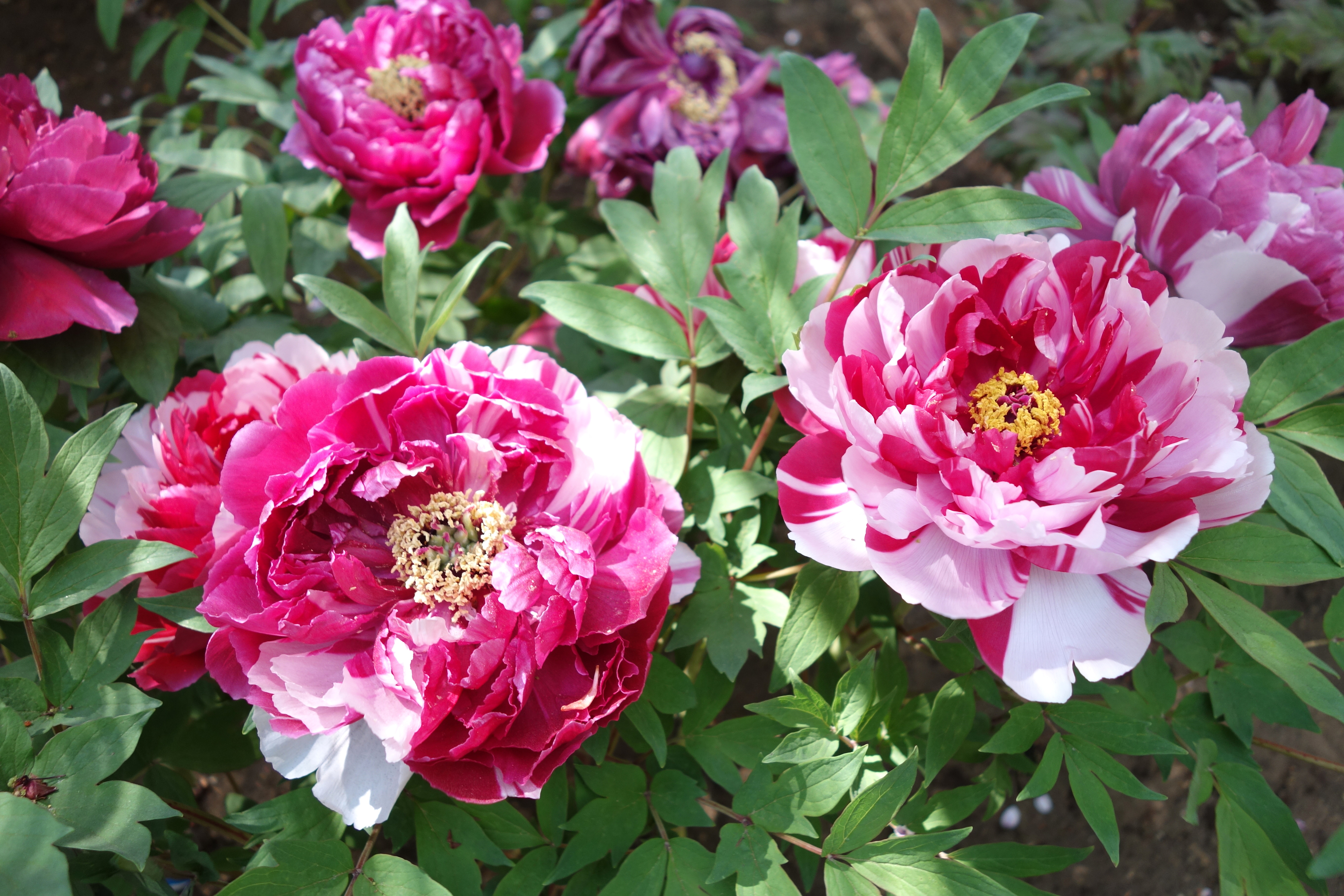
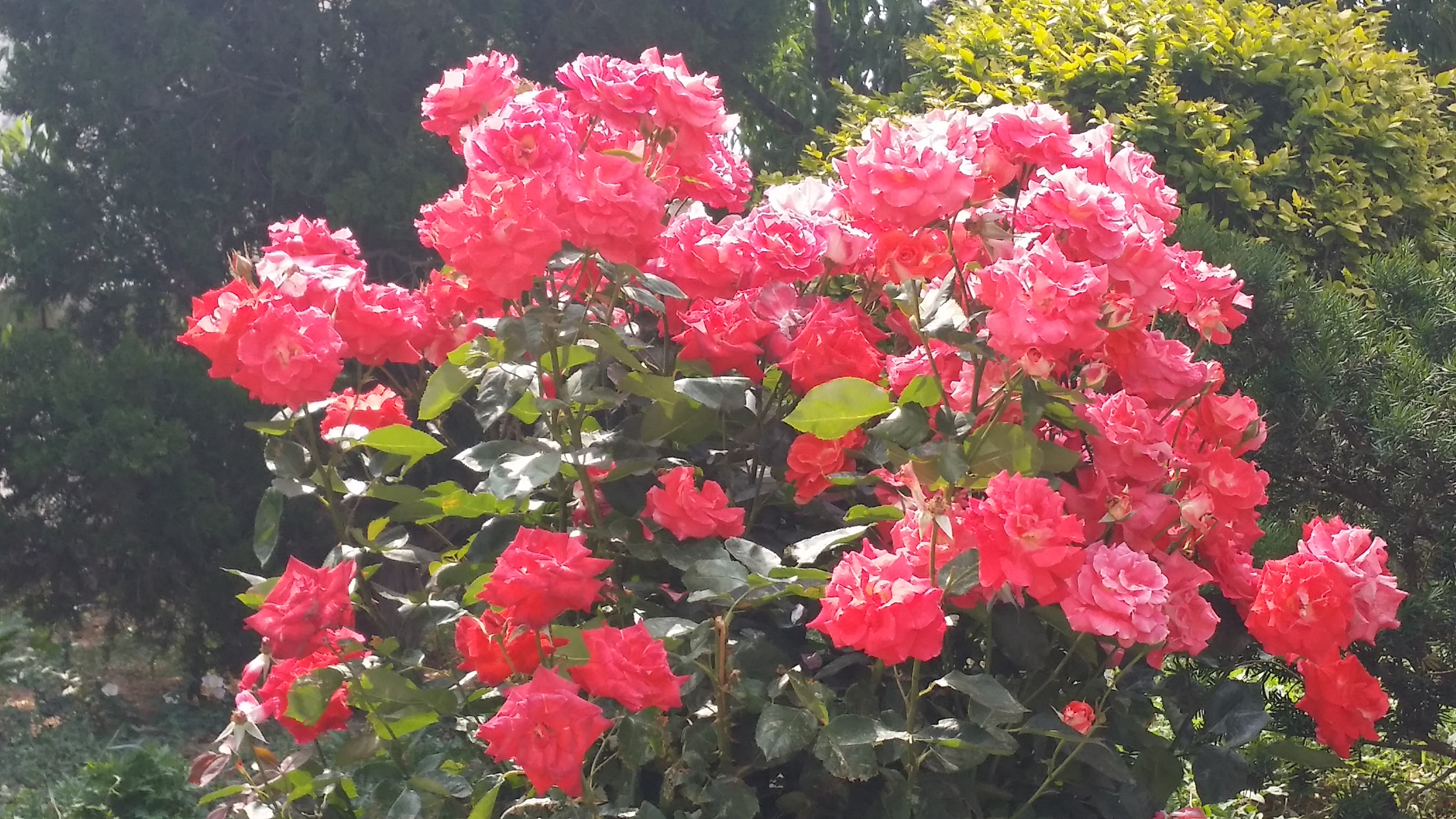
Who?	Into what?	By whom?	Notes	Image
Acantha ("thorn")	Acanthus	Unclear	Acantha was a nymph who supposedly ran away from Apollo's amorous advances and was turned into an acanthus plant, scratching his face when he tried to catch her. This story however is not found in any ancient writer.
Amethyste ("non-drunk")	Amethyst	Artemis	Amethyste in a story by French poet Remy Belleau is a nymph who fled from Dionysus' unwanted embrace, and was transformed into a white stone by Diana/Artemis, which was later turned purple when Dionysus poured wine on it.
Antirrhinon	Antirrhinum	Priapus	Invented by French prolific writer and agronomist Louis Liger in his work Le Jardinier Fleuriste et Historiographe, 1704. He wrote that after a quarrel, Priapus killed Antirrhinon, and then transformed him into a flower. Although the word 'antirrhinum' has a Greek etymology, it was first used in 1551.
Astraea's tears	Aster flower	None	Astraea abandoned the human race once she saw that they had become cruel, arrogant and injust. As she looked down on earth from her place among the stars, she wept, and the tears that fell on the earth transformed into star flowers.
Clytie	Sunflower	None	In a common distortion of Clytie's tale above, supposedly after being rejected by (a god wrongly identified as) Apollo, she transformed into a yellow sunflower. Sunflowers are not native to the Old World.
Cynara ("artichoke")	Artichoke	Zeus	Found in books from the 1990s. Supposedly Cynara from the island of Cinarus was a beautiful maiden who attracted the attention of Zeus and was brought by him to Olympus. She, missing her family, fled back to the earth, and was turned into an artichoke by the rejected god.
Fingernails	Onyx ("fingernail")	None	The onyx was supposedly created when Eros clipped his mother Aphrodite's nails with his arrows, and they transformed into onyx as they fell into the Indus river.
Lightning bolt	Carnation	Zeus	Zeus, wishing to acquire a sacred plant like his wife Hera had her own lily, threw a lightning bolt on the earth, and thus the red carnation came to be, which in Greek is diosanthos, "flower of Zeus".
Midas' daughter	Gold	Midas	Midas's unnamed daughter was supposedly turned accidentally into gold by her own father. Midas does not have a daughter who turned into gold or otherwise in ancient texts, and this bit is only found in American writer Nathaniel Hawthorne.
Orchis	Orchid	Dionysus	Supposedly, Orchis was the son of a satyr and a nymph, part of Dionysus's retinue. When he raped a nymph-follower of Dionysus, the god killed him, and the blood of Orchis seeped into the ground and became the orchid, meaning "testicle". This myth is unattested in classical sources and was instead invented by French prolific writer and agronomist Louis Liger in 1704.
Paeon	Peony	Zeus or Hades	Paeon was a talented doctor, the discipline of Asclepius, the god of medicine. Paeon was so skillful that he outdid even his master, becoming a more successful healer. Asclepius grew jealous, so he killed his student. Either Zeus or Hades gave new life to Paeon by transforming him into a peony flower. (Note: However, the etymological connection of 'Paeon' to Greek 'paeonia' is genuine. Peony was used in treatments.)
Rhodanthe ("roseflower")	Rose	Apollo	In the works of French writer René Rapin, Rhodanthe was a beautiful queen of Corinth had attracted the attention of several enamored princes who besieged her inside the temple of Artemis. Apollo then turned her into a rosebush.

== Bibliography ==
- Buxton, Richard (2009). Forms of Astonishment: Greek Myths of Metamorphosis. Oxford University Press. ISBN 9780191554162.
- Celoria, Francis (1992). The Metamorphoses of Antoninus Liberalis: A Translation with a Commentary. Routledge. ISBN 0-415-06896-7.
- Endersby, Jim (November 7, 2016). Orchid: A Cultural History. Chicago, London: University of Chicago Press. ISBN 978-0-226-37632-5.
- Forbes Irving, Paul M. C. (1990). Metamorphosis in Greek Myths. Oxford, New York, Toronto: Oxford University Press, Clarendon Press. ISBN 0-19-814730-9.
- Galinsky, Karl (1975). Ovid's Metamorphoses: an introduction to the basic aspects. Berkeley: University of California Press. ISBN 978-0-520-02848-7.
