= Myrrha (disambiguation) =

Myrrha is the mother of Adonis in Greek mythology.

Myrrha may also refer to:

- Myrrha, a character from Lord Byron's play Sardanapalus
- Myrrha, a cantata by André Caplet
- Myrrha (Ravel cantata), a cantata by Maurice Ravel
- 381 Myrrha, a very large main-belt asteroid
- MYRRHA, a developmental nuclear reactor designed by SCK•CEN
- "Myrrha" (short story), by Gary Jennings

== Organisms ==
- Libythea myrrha, a butterfly of India
- Myrrha (beetle), a genus of ladybug beetles
  - Myrrha octodecimguttata a species of ladybug
- Polyommatus myrrha, a butterfly of Turkey and the Caucuses
- Commiphora myrrha, a tree in the Burseraceae family

== See also ==
- Myrrh (disambiguation)
