= Nycteus (mythology) =

Several mythological figures

In Greek mythology, Nycteus (Ancient Greek: Νυκτεύς, romanized: Nukteús, lit. 'nocturnal') can refer to the following figures:

- Nycteus, king-regent of Thebes and father of Antiope whom he punished for bearing sons to Zeus.
- Nycteus, one of the comrades of Diomedes who were turned into birds by Aphrodite.
- Nycteus, the name of Callisto's father in some rare versions.
- Nycteus, king of the Aethiopians and father of Nyctaea, who consorted with him secretly under false pretences. When Nycteus figured out who his bedmate was, he tried to kill Nyctaea but she was transformed into a bird by Athena. This story is a parallel to the one with Smyrna and her father Cinyras or Theias, the parents of Adonis.
- Nycteus, a black horse, one of the four horses that draw Hades' chariot.
- Nycteus, one of the sons of Celaeno and Poseidon.

== Bibliography ==
- Apollodorus, Apollodorus, The Library, with an English Translation by Sir James George Frazer, F.B.A., F.R.S. in 2 Volumes. Cambridge, MA, Harvard University Press; London, William Heinemann Ltd. 1921. Online version at the Perseus Digital Library.
- Claudian, The Rape of Proserpine translated by Platnauer, Maurice. Loeb Classical Library Volumes 135 & 136. Cambridge, MA. Harvard University Press. 1922. Online version at Bill Thayer's Web Site
- Hyginus, Gaius Julius, The Myths of Hyginus, Edited and translated by Mary A. Grant, Lawrence: University of Kansas Press, 1960. Online version at Topos Text.
- Lactantius Placidus, Lactantii Placidi qui dicitur Commentarios in Statii Thebaida it Commentarium in Achilleida recensuit, translated by Richard Jahnke, 1898, B. G. Tevbneri, Lipsiae.
- Ovid, Metamorphoses with an English translation by Arthur Golding. London. W. Seres. 1567. Available on the Perseus Digital Library.
- Pepin, Ronald E. (2008). The Vatican Mythographers. New York City: Fordham University Press. ISBN 978-0-8232-2892-8.
