= Histiaea =

Histiaea or Histiaia (Ancient Greek: Ἱστίαια) may refer to:

- Histiaea (mythology), a daughter of Hyrieus, from whom the town of Histiaea, in Northern Euboea, was said to have derived its name
- Oreus or Histiaea, an ancient city on the northwest coast of Euboea
- Hestiaea (Attica), a deme/township of ancient Attica

== See also ==
- Histiaeotis, a district of ancient Thessaly
