= Neophron (mythology) =

Greek mythological character

In Greek mythology, Neophron (Ancient Greek: Νεόφρων, romanized: Neophron) is a minor mythological character, who, in order to take revenge against Aegypius seducing his mother Timandra, seduced Aegypius's own mother Bulis. His myth is preserved in the works of Antoninus Liberalis.

== Etymology ==
The word 'Neophron' is found as meaning 'foolish in mind' (literally, 'new in mind') in Liddell & Scott. Celoria argues however that "too much must not be made of this" as Neophron was a very common personal name, with no implications of foolishness.

== Mythology ==
Neophron's mother Timandra became lovers with a much younger man named Aegypius. Neophron greatly disapproved of the relationship, so he decided to play a trick on Aegypius. In turn, he seduced Aegypius' own mother Bulis and brought her into his house one day that Aegypius was bound to make his accustomed visit to Timandra, having made sure earlier that Timandra would be out. He then excused himself, and led Aegypius to Bulis. Unknowingly, mother and son lay with each other due to Neophron's machinations. When they woke up, and realized what had happened, Aegypius prayed to the heavens that they would vanish, and Zeus turned all four of them into birds. Both Aegypius and Neophron turned into vultures (aegypius).

== See also ==
- Myrrha
- Nyctaea
- Theias

== Bibliography ==
- Antoninus Liberalis, The Metamorphoses of Antoninus Liberalis translated by Francis Celoria (Routledge 1992). Online version at the Topos Text Project.
- Celoria, Francis (1992). The Metamorphoses of Antoninus Liberalis: A Translation with a Commentary. Routledge. ISBN 0-415-06896-7.
