= Histiaea (mythology) =

Nymph in Greek mythology

Histiaea. Silver tetrobol, 3rd-2nd century BC

Histiaea (Ancient Greek: Ἱστιαία, romanized: Histiaia) was, in Greek mythology, the eponymous nymph and legendary founder of the ancient Greek city of Histiaea in northern Euboea. According to tradition she was a daughter of King Hyrieus, and thus a sister of the giant hunter Orion.

The ancient city of Histiaea lay in a strategically important and fertile location at the entrance to the North Euboean Gulf. Homer, in the Catalogue of Ships in the Iliad, refers to it by the epithet πολυστάφυλος ("rich in grapes"). The polis issued coinage depicting the nymph crowned with a wreath of vine leaves and grapes; on the reverse she was shown seated on the stern of a war-galley, holding a stylis (a ship's ornamental standard), in her role as guide and protector of the city's fleet.

== Mythology ==
Histiaea was, according to ancient tradition, a daughter of Hyrieus, king of Hyria in Boeotia; some sources name the naiad Clonia as her mother, though accounts of the family vary. The town of Histiaea in northern Euboea was said to derive its name from her. Through her father she was a sister of Lycus, Nycteus and the hunter Orion.

Hyrieus himself was said to be a son of Poseidon and the Pleiad Alcyone. A separate tradition, recorded by Pausanias, associates him with the treasure-house built for him by Agamedes and Trophonius; this legend belongs primarily to the mythology of Hyrieus and Boeotian Hyria rather than to Histiaea herself.

The neighbouring town of Oreus, united with Histiaea in a synoikismos in 445 BC, was said instead to take its name from Orion, who was raised there. On this basis, August Baumeister suggested that Hyrieus — Histiaea's father in the standard genealogy — might in origin be identical with Orion himself, implying that the two neighbouring foundation legends (of Histiaea and Oreus) reflect a single underlying local hero venerated under two names. This proposal sits in tension with the more common tradition, recorded by Apollodorus and Hyginus, in which Orion is Hyrieus's son and thus Histiaea's brother.

== Numismatic depictions ==
The nymph's iconography is known only from her depiction on the coinage of Histiaea; no ancient literary description survives. The city issued coinage depicting its eponymous nymph over several distinct periods, spanning roughly two centuries.

Early issues. The first coins that can be attributed to Histiaea with certainty belong to the half-century before Alexander the Great (c. 369–336 BC). Fittingly, the vine motif that had earned the town its Homeric epithet πολυστάφυλος occupies a prominent place on the Histiaean coins.

Period of 313–265 BC. Following the declaration of Euboean independence in 313 BC, a further, relatively short-lived issue introduced the type that would become canonical for the city: the head of a maenad (the nymph Histiaea) wearing a vine-wreath, her hair bound in a sphendone, on the obverse; and, on the reverse, the nymph — identified by the legend ΙΣΤΙΑΙΕΩΝ — seated on the stern of a war-galley, holding a stylis (a freestanding ornamental standard mounted at a ship's stern, of Phoenician origin, taking the place of a divine image). Earlier scholars, including Mionnet and Eckhel, had misread this scene, taking the aphlaston (the ship's curved stern-ornament) for a swelling sail and placing the nymph at the bow rather than the stern.

A well-documented example of this type, from the BCD Collection, weighs 2.42 g and shows the nymph's hair rendered in tight curls, together with an earring and necklace; the reverse bears a control-monogram combining the letters Α and Μ.

Recovery under Antigonus Gonatas (265–197 BC). No autonomous Histiaean coinage is attested for this period.

Late issue (197–146 BC). After Flamininus's proclamation of Greek freedom in 196 BC, Histiaea — together with Carystus, Chalcis, and Eretria — resumed minting in quantity. These late tetrobols, often carelessly struck, range in weight from approximately 28 to 39 grains (c. 1.8–2.5 g), and their large number of control-monograms suggests a prolonged period of issue. Stylistically they are debased copies of the finer coinage of 313–265 BC. No evidence survives of any Euboean coinage between 146 BC and the Imperial period.

Head noted that these late Histiaean tetrobols share both weight standard and obverse type with contemporary small silver coinage minted in Macedonia, which likewise ceased around 146 BC. In antiquity, coinage of this type was known generically as Ἱστιαϊκά or [ἀργύριον] Ἱστιαϊκόν ("Histiaean [silver]"), a term attested in the Delian inventory of Demares (c. 185–180 BC).

== Modern forgeries ==
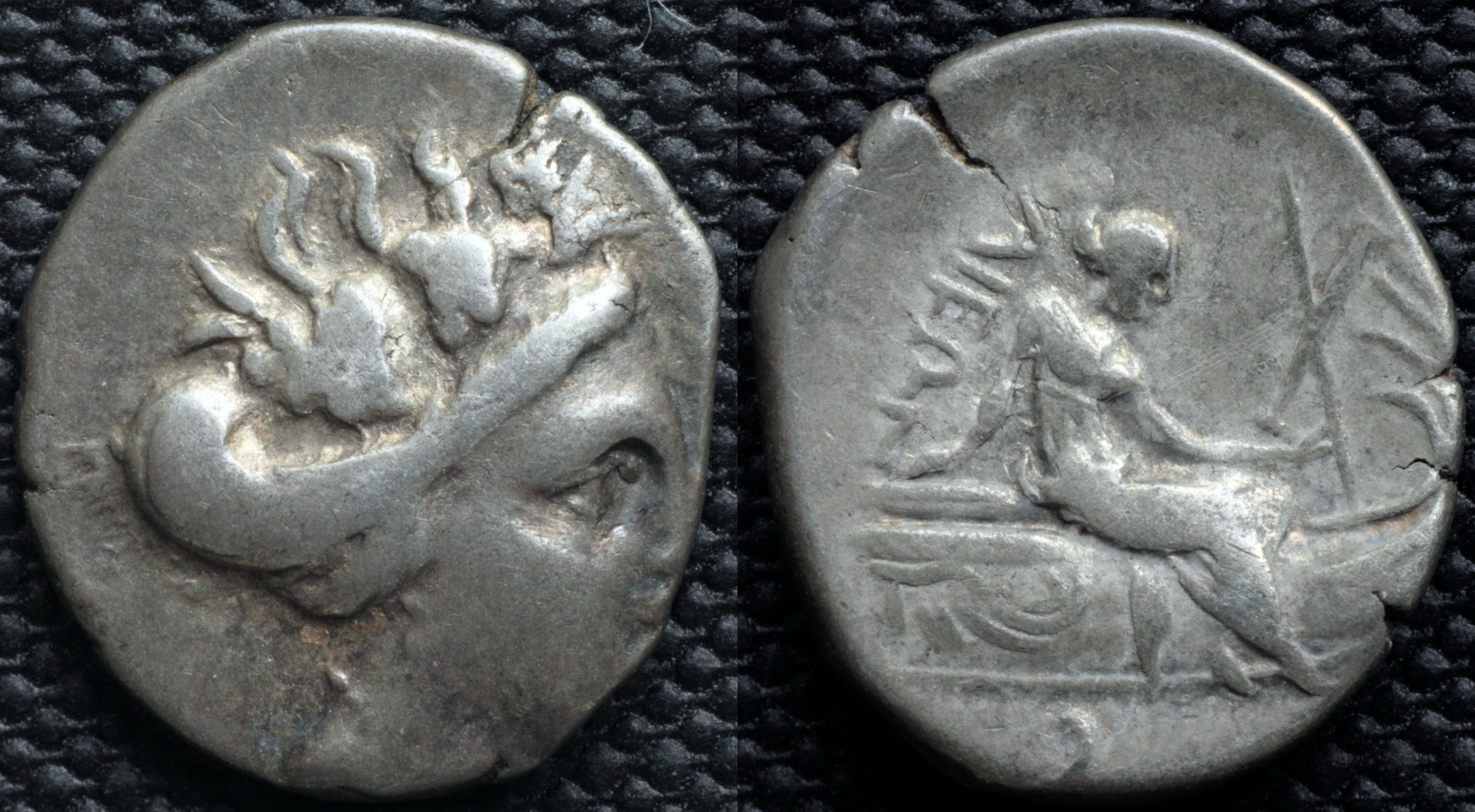

Because of their high original mintage and the debased, variable style of the late (197–146 BC) issue, Histiaean tetrobols have become a frequent target of modern counterfeiting. A particularly well-documented group of forgeries, informally known among collectors as the "Wild Hair" type, has circulated widely since the late 1990s.

According to numismatist and collector Barry P. Murphy, these forgeries first appeared on the market only weeks after a separate, unrelated 1999 New York hoard of fake Apollonia Pontica coins, and were produced by the same counterfeiters. Murphy identified several diagnostic features distinguishing this group from genuine issues: an obverse hairstyle with locks "flowing... pointing upwards" and unusually large, pellet-like elements in place of the wreath's grape clusters — a treatment not found on authentic dies — together with a crudely executed reverse. On the forgeries, the legend AIEΩΝ is consistently placed behind the nymph and ΙΣΤΙ before her feet; a wing is shown decorating the galley's side, but the coins consistently lack the control-monograms or symbols beneath the stern that are characteristic of genuine dies of this issue.

Weight provides a further point of distinction: whereas genuine Histiaean tetrobols of the Hellenistic period generally weigh in the range of approximately 1.8–2.5 grams, even in their most carelessly struck late issues, examples of the "Wild Hair" group documented by Murphy are typically markedly lighter, commonly falling in the range of roughly 1.3–1.9 grams.

== Bibliography ==
Primary sources

- Homer (1924). Iliad. Loeb Classical Library. Translated by Murray, A. T. Cambridge, MA: Harvard University Press.
- Eustathius of Thessalonica (1971–1987). van der Valk, Marchinus (ed.). Commentarii ad Homeri Iliadem pertinentes [Commentary on Homer's Iliad]. Leiden: Brill.
- Strabo (1917–1932). Jones, Horace Leonard (ed.). Geographica [Geography]. Loeb Classical Library. William Heinemann (London) / Harvard University Press (Cambridge, MA). Book 10, Ch. 1, §3.
- Pseudo-Apollodorus (1921). Frazer, James George (ed.). Bibliotheca [Library]. Loeb Classical Library. Cambridge, MA: Harvard University Press.
- Hyginus (2002). Marshall, Peter K. (ed.). Fabulae. Munich: K.G. Saur.

Secondary sources

- Eckhel, Joseph Hilarius (1792). Doctrina Numorum Veterum. Pars I: De Numis Urbium, Populorum, Regum. Vol. 2: Reliquas Europae Regiones cum Parte Asiae Minoris Complectens. Vienna: Josephus Vincentius Degen. p. 325.
- Head, Barclay V. (1884). A Catalogue of the Greek Coins in the British Museum: Central Greece. London: British Museum.
- Head, Barclay V. (1887). Historia Numorum: A Manual of Greek Numismatics. Oxford: The Clarendon Press. p. 308.
- Smith, William, ed. (1846). Dictionary of Greek and Roman Biography and Mythology. Vol. 2. London: Taylor, Walton, and Maberly.
- Roscher, Wilhelm Heinrich (1884–1937). Roscher, Wilhelm Heinrich (ed.). Ausführliches Lexikon der griechischen und römischen Mythologie. Leipzig: B.G. Teubner.
- Baumeister, August (1864). Topographische Skizze der Insel Euboia (Programmschrift). Lübeck: s.n. p. 58.
- Geyer, Fritz (1903). Topographie und Geschichte der Insel Euboia. Berlin: Weidmann. pp. 82–89.

Numismatic and web sources

- "Histiaea BMC Histiaea 24-27 (350-300 BC)". IRIS.
- "Histiaea BMC Histiaea 31-130 (300-200 BC)". IRIS.
- "Numismatik Lanz. Münzen von Euboia: Sammlung BCD. Auction 111, Munich, 25 November 2002". unil.ch. 2002-11-25. Archived from the original on 2026-09-03.
- "BCD. Numismatik Lanz. Münzen von Euboia". acsearch. 2002-11-25.
- Hoeft, Hans-Joachim (2022-02-09). "Histiaia and her family". CoinTalk. Archived from the original on 2026-09-04.
- Murphy, Barry P. (2008-01-13). "Fake silver tetrobol of Histiaia in Euboia, 196-146 BCE". Forum Ancient Coins. Archived from the original on 2023-11-16.
- Murphy, Barry P. (2007-07-03). "Fake Histiaia Tetrobols". bpmurphy.ancients.info. Archived from the original on 2025-08-18.
- "The Barry P. Murphy Collection of Ancient Coins". bpmurphy.ancients.info. 2004-12-09. Archived from the original on 2026-03-06.
