= Nyctaea =

Greek mythological figure

In Greek mythology, Nyctaea (Ancient Greek: Νυκταία, romanized: Nuktaía, lit. 'nocturnal') is a princess featuring in two stories about father-daughter incest, who is eventually turned into an owl by the goddess Athena. Both her tales are preserved in the works of pseudo-Lactantius Placidus, a Latin grammarian of the third century AD, and the second of the Vatican Mythographers.

== Etymology ==
Nyctaea's name is derived from the Greek word νύξ (genitive νυκτός) meaning "night". Νύξ in turn is of Proto-Indo-European origin, from the PIE root *nókʷts, from which 'night' is also descended.

== Family ==
Depending on version, Nyctaea is either the daughter of Nycteus (most notable bearer of that name is usually a king of Thebes, but here identified as a king of the Aethiopians) or the Argive king Proetus.

== Mythology ==
=== Nycteus ===
In the first version, Nyctaea harboured an incestuous desire for her father, and confessed her feelings to a nurse, who helped her deceive and trick her father into bedding her by pretending to be some unrelated maiden after the nurse told Nycteus that some foreign maiden was in love with him. When Nycteus found out what was truly going on, he was so enraged he meant to kill Nyctaea, who implored Athena to save her. Athena took her under her protection by changing her into night owl.

=== Proetus ===
In another version mentioned by the same author, the Argive princess Nyctaea fled her home in terror so she could escape being raped by her father. Athena took pity in her and transformed her into a night owl, the bird sacred to Athena.

== Symbolism ==
The version with Nycteus is identical to the more popular story of Myrrha or Smyrna (a girl who fell in love with her father Cinyras and tricked him into sleeping with her), and was likely modelled after it. The version with Proetus is closer to the myth of Nyctimene, a maiden who was raped by her father and was turned into an owl by Athena.

== See also ==
Other instances of incest in Greek mythology:

- Aegypius
- Jocasta
- Byblis
- Larissa

== Bibliography ==
- Beekes, Robert S. P. (2010). Lucien van Beek (ed.). Etymological Dictionary of Greek. Leiden Indo-European Etymological Dictionary Series. Vol. ΙΙ. Leiden, the Netherlands: Brill Publications. ISBN 978-90-04-17419-1.
- Forbes Irving, Paul M. C. (1990). Metamorphosis in Greek Myths. Clarendon Press. ISBN 0-19-814730-9.
- Furter, Edmond D. (2021). "The Greece and Aegean Myth Map". Stoneprint. 7.
- Hyginus, Gaius Julius, The Myths of Hyginus. Edited and translated by Mary A. Grant, Lawrence: University of Kansas Press, 1960.
- Lactantius Placidus, Lactantii Placidi qui dicitur Commentarios in Statii Thebaida it Commentarium in Achilleida recensuit, translated by Richard Jahnke, 1898, B. G. Tevbneri, Lipsiae.
- Lamprinoudakēs, V. K. (1971). Mērotraphēs. Athens, Greece: National and Kapodistrian University of Athens.
- Liddell, Henry George; Scott, Robert (1940). A Greek-English Lexicon, revised and augmented throughout by Sir Henry Stuart Jones with the assistance of Roderick McKenzie. Oxford: Clarendon Press. Online version at Perseus.tufts project.
- Pepin, Ronald E. (2008). The Vatican Mythographers. New York City: Fordham University Press. ISBN 978-0-8232-2892-8.
- von Pauly, August Friedrich (1971). Paulys Realencyclopädie der classischen Altertumswissenschaft: Neue Bearbeitung unter Mitwirkung zahlreicher Fachgenossen (in German). Vol. 17, part 2. Germany: Druckenmüller Verlag.
