= Erinoma =

Greek mythological person

In ancient Greek and Roman mythology, Erinoma (/ɛrɪˈnəmɑː/) or Erinona (/ɛrɪˈnənɑː/) (Note: Her name has also been variously found in Latin manuscripts as Erinoma, Erinona, Erittoma or even Eurynome. What the original Greek spelling of name might have been is not knowable.) is a beautiful maiden who attracted the attention of both Zeus and Adonis, as well as the wrath of Hera and Aphrodite. Her story seems to be a local variant of Adonis's myth originating from the island of Cyprus, and survives only in the late works of Servius, a Latin grammarian who lived during the early fifth century AD.

== Family ==
Erinoma was the daughter of a man named Celes, the son of either Ion or Epiuotasterius, (Note: The manuscript where his name is attested is corrupted. Original spelling is unclear.) two men who arrived to Cyprus from nearby Egypt.

== Mythology ==
According to the most common versions, Adonis was the son of Cinyras or Theias by his own daughter Myrrha or Smyrna, who tricked her father into bedding her in secret. She then ran away once discovered, and transformed into a myrrh tree, causing her infant son, Adonis to be born some months later from the tree trunk. Adonis was greatly loved by Aphrodite, although he was also made to divide his year between her and Persephone. When he was out hunting one day, he was mortally wounded by a boar. In some versions, that boar was Ares, or Apollo, or perhaps it sent by Artemis as revenge against the goddess of love. Aphrodite greatly mourned her beloved and transformed his blood into a red anemone.

In what appears to be a localized version in Cyprus however, Erinoma was a Cypriot girl of great beauty and chastity. The virgin goddesses Artemis and Athena both favoured her for her purity, but Aphrodite on the other hand disliked her, and she made Zeus fall in love with her, so that she would not escape from the domain of love. But Zeus's wife Hera was not too pleased about the prospect of her husband cheating on her again, so she bid Aphrodite to make Adonis fall in love with Erinoma as well. Adonis failed to win the girl's affections, so Aphrodite wrapped him in a cloud so he could gain access to Erinoma's bedroom with ease. There he found her and he raped her. Artemis then turned Erinoma into a peahen.

Zeus, however, was enraged upon finding out what had happened to his beloved, so Adonis fled to Mount Cassius for safety. It was Hermes who lured him out of his hiding with the help of a boar (which was Ares in disguise). Once in the open, Zeus struck Adonis with a lightning bolt, killing him. Aphrodite complained about the murder and greatly lamented Adonis's passing. Hermes then brought back Adonis's shade to his people, but he was only fully restored to life by Zeus when Hera requested so. Artemis, meanwhile, restored the peahen Erinoma back to her human form, who then gave birth to Adonis' son Taleus.

== In culture ==
The local background and significance of this story is not entirely apparent, though it is known that Zeus Ceraunius ("Zeus of the lightning bolt") was worshipped in Mount Cassius; there is no evidence that peacocks held any importance however. This tale shares elements with the story of Actaeon, also a rival of Zeus in some versions, and Hippolytus, who was killed by a god but resurrected at a goddess' behalf.

== Legacy ==
Erinome, also known as Jupiter XXV, a retrograde irregular satellite of the planet Jupiter, was named after this Erinoma.

== See also ==
- Rhodopis and Euthynicus
- Melos
- Argus Panoptes

== Bibliography ==
- Fontenrose, Joseph Eddy (1981). Orion: The Myth of the Hunter and the Huntress. University of California Press. ISBN 0-520-09632-0.
- Forbes Irving, Paul M. C. (1990). Metamorphosis in Greek Myths. Clarendon Press. ISBN 0-19-814730-9.
- Green, C. M. C. (2007). Roman Religion and the Cult of Diana at Aricia. New York City: Cambridge University Press. ISBN 978-0-521-85158-9.
- Maurus Servius Honoratus. In Vergilii carmina comentarii. Servii Grammatici qui feruntur in Vergilii carmina commentarii; recensuerunt Georgius Thilo et Hermannus Hagen. Georgius Thilo. Leipzig. B. G. Teubner. 1881.
