= Cenchreis =

Queen in Greek mythology

In Greek mythology, Cenchreis (Ancient Greek: Κεγχρηίς, romanized: Kenkhrēís) is a queen of Cyprus and the wife of Cinyras, by whom she became the mother of a girl. Cenchreis earned the wrath of Aphrodite when she bragged that her daughter was more beautiful than the goddess. Her tale is preserved in Roman accounts.

== Family ==
Cenchreis married Cinyras, the king of Cyprus or Assyria, and together they had one daughter, called Smyrna or Myrrha. In some authors, the wife of Cinyras is called Metharme or Orithyia.

== Mythology ==
Cenchreis was very proud of her daughter's great beauty, so she declared that she was even prettier than Venus (Roman Aphrodite), the goddess of beauty and love. (Note: Savva 2023, pp. 191–3; Tripp 1970, p. 164) Venus was angered, and punished Cenchreis' hubris by making the girl fall in love with her own father. Then, during a festival in honour of Ceres (Roman Demeter) where Cenchreis was pre-occupied with the celebrations, the daughter secretly lay with a drunk Cinyras without his knowledge and conceived a son, Adonis.

== Interpretation ==
Some authors make Smyrna herself the agent who angered the gods and cause of her own misery, or omit the curse entirely. (Note: Hard 2004, p. 198; Gantz 1996, p. 730) Surviving accounts do not make it clear whether Cenchreis knew about the incestuous affair between her husband and daughter and Adonis' birth or not. Two main versions of the tale circulated in late antiquity; one oriental where the father is called Theias, and one Cypriot where he is substituted with the local king Cinyras. Hyginus, who relates Cenchreis' hubris, combined elements from both versions.

== See also ==
Other women who doomed their children in Greek mythology:

- Cassiopeia
- Niobe

== Bibliography ==
- Antoninus Liberalis, The Metamorphoses of Antoninus Liberalis translated by Francis Celoria (Routledge 1992). Online version at the Topos Text Project.
- Apollodorus, The Library, with an English Translation by Sir James George Frazer, F.B.A., F.R.S. in 2 Volumes. Cambridge, MA, Harvard University Press; London, William Heinemann Ltd. 1921. Online version at the Perseus Digital Library.
- Bell, Robert E. (1991). Women of Classical Mythology: A Biographical Dictionary. ABC-Clio. ISBN 9780874365818.
- Gantz, Timothy (1996). Early Greek Myth: A Guide to Literary and Artistic Sources. Vol. II. Johns Hopkins University Press. ISBN 978-0-8018-5362-3.
- Grimal, Pierre (1987). The Dictionary of Classical Mythology. Wiley-Blackwell. ISBN 0-631-13209-0.
- Hard, Robin (2004). The Routledge Handbook of Greek Mythology: Based on H. J. Rose's "Handbook of Greek Mythology". Routledge. ISBN 9780415186360.
- Hyginus, Gaius Julius, The Myths of Hyginus, edited and translated by Mary A. Grant, Lawrence: University of Kansas Press, 1960. Available online on Topos Text.
- Lactantius Placidus, Argumenta, in Lateinische Mythographen: Lactantius Placidus, Argumente der Metamorphosen Ovids, erstes heft, Dr. B. Bunte, Bremen, 1852, J. Kühtmann & Comp.
- Ovid, Metamorphoses volume II: Books 9-15. Translated by Frank Justus Miller. Revised by G. P. Goold. Loeb Classical Library 43. Cambridge, MA: Harvard University Press, 1916. Available online at Loeb Classical Library.
- Pepin, Ronald E. (2008). The Vatican Mythographers. New York City: Fordham University Press. ISBN 978-0-8232-2892-8.
- Plutarch, pseudo-, Parallela Minora in The Moralia, with an English Translation by Frank Cole Babbitt. Cambridge, MA. Harvard University Press. London. William Heinemann Ltd. 1936. 4. Online version at Topos Text.
- Savva, Emilia (2023). "On the Track of Venus' Cult". Cyprus in Texts from Graeco-Roman Antiquity. BRILL. ISBN 978-90-04-52948-9.
- Maurus Servius Honoratus, In Vergilii carmina comentarii. Servii Grammatici qui feruntur in Vergilii carmina commentarii; recensuerunt Georgius Thilo et Hermannus Hagen. Georgius Thilo. Leipzig. B. G. Teubner. 1881. Available online at Perseus Digital Library.
- Schmitz, Leonhard (1867). Smith, William (ed.). A Dictionary of Greek and Roman Biography and Mythology. London, UK: John Murray, printed by Spottiswoode and Co. Online version at the Perseus.tufts library.
- Tripp, Edward (June 1970). Crowell's Handbook of Classical Mythology (1st ed.). Thomas Y. Crowell Co. ISBN 069022608X.
