= Orithyia =

Greek mythological figures with same name

In Greek mythology, Orithyia or Oreithyia (/ɒrɪˈθaɪ.ə/; Ancient Greek: Ὠρείθυια, romanized: Ōreíthyia; Latin: Ōrīthyia; lit. 'mountain-raging' or 'mountain-rushing') was the name of the following women:

- Orithyia or Orythya, the Nereid of raging seas and one of the 50 marine-nymph daughters of the 'Old Man of the Sea' Nereus and the Oceanid Doris. She and her other sisters appear to Thetis when she cries out in sympathy for the grief of Achilles at the slaying of Patroclus.
- Orithyia, a daughter of Cecrops, wife of Makednos and mother of Europus.
- Orithyia, a daughter of Erechtheus, who was abducted by Boreas.
- Orithyia, a nymph, who was either the mother of Cinyras by Belus or the wife of Cinyras and mother of Smyrna/Myrrha (thus doublet of Cenchreis).
- Orithyia, queen of the Amazons.
