= Megassares =

In Greek mythology, Megassares (Ancient Greek: Μεγασσάρου) was a King of Hyria and the father of Pharnace. The latter married King Sandocus of Celendreis in Cilicia and bore to him Cinyras who became the future ruler of Cyprus and the reputed father of Adonis.

== Mythology ==
Megassares’ possible predecessor was Hyrieus, the eponymous ruler of Hyria, who was well represented in the myth of the giant Orion.
