= Pharnace (mythology) =

In Greek mythology, Pharnace (Ancient Greek: Φαρνάκην) was a Hyrian princess as the daughter of King Megassares of Hyria.

== Mythology ==
By King Sandocus of Celendreis in Cilicia, Pharnace became the mother of Cinyras who later ruled over Cyprus.

Otherwise, the parentage of the Cypriot king was attributed to the following: (1) Eurymedon and the nymph Paphia, (2) Amathousa, (3) Apollo or lastly, (4) Paphos.
