= Oreus =

Town near the north coast of ancient Euboea

Coordinates: 38°56′48″N 23°05′26″E

- Interactive map of Oreus

Silver tetrobol from Euboia, Histaia. Wreathed head of the Nymph Histiaia right; [IΣTI] - AEIΩN, Nymph Histiaia seated right on stern of galley, ornamented with wing, holding naval standard; AP monogram and labrys in exergue; BMC 61; BCD 391

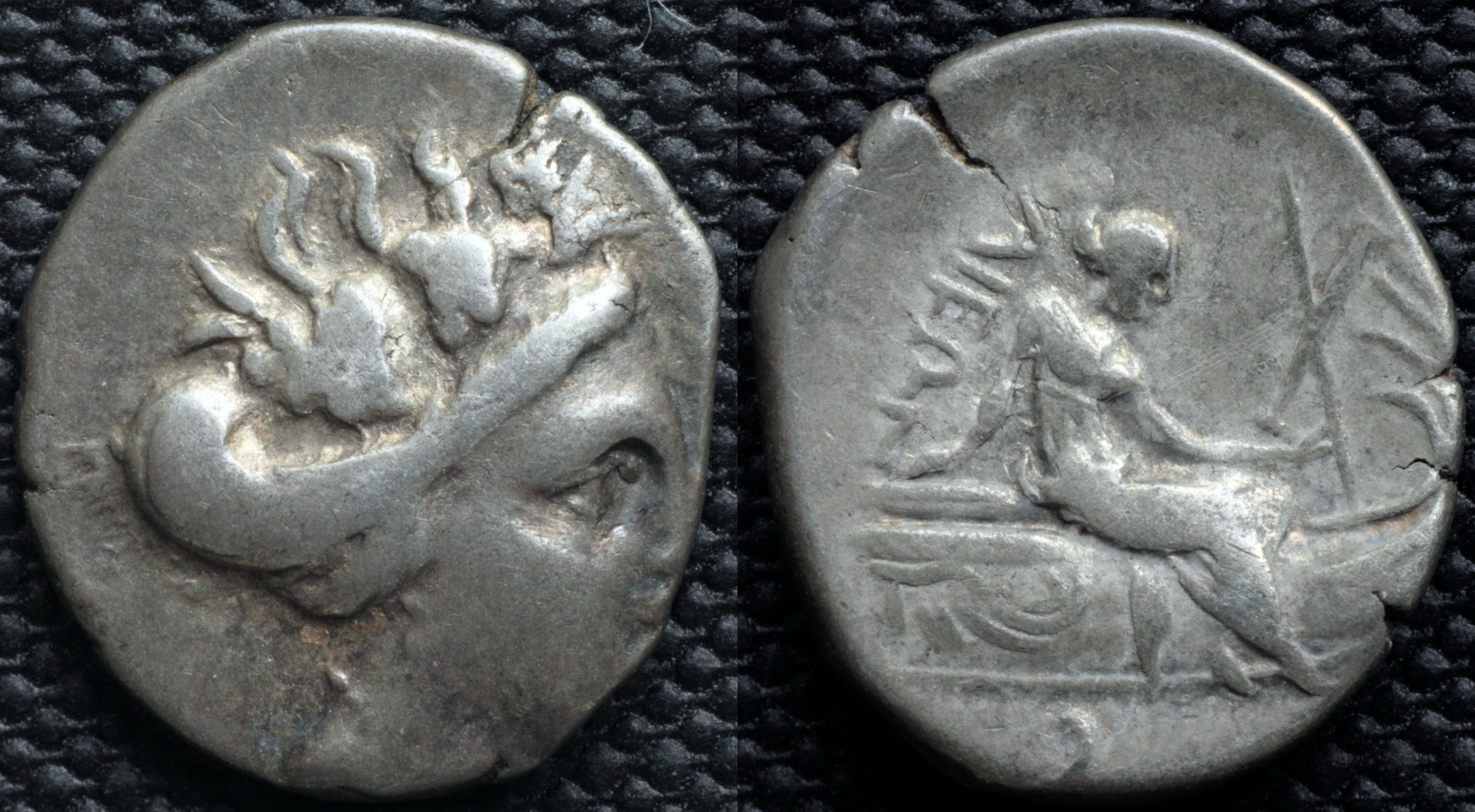

First side of the image: O: Maenad with wine-wreath
Second side of the image: R: nymph Histiaea seated on stern of galley IΣTI / AIEΩN
Silver tetrobol. This coin is probably a Roman imitation of an Histiaean issue struck in Macedonia during the Roman's military campaign circa 168 BC.

Oreus or Oreos (Ancient Greek: Ὠρεός, romanized: Ōreos), prior to the 5th century BC called Histiaea or Histiaia (Ἱστίαια), also Hestiaea or Hestiaia (Ἑστίαια), was a town near the north coast of ancient Euboea, situated upon the river Callas, at the foot of Mount Telethrium, and opposite Antron on the Thessalian coast. From this town the whole northern extremity of Euboea was named Histiaeotis (Ἱστιαιῶτις, Ionic Greek: Ἱστιαιῆτις) According to some it was a colony from the Attic deme of Histiaea; according to others it was founded by the Thessalian Perrhaebi. Another foundation story had it that the name Histiaea is said to derive from the mythical figure Histiaea, the daughter of Hyrieus. It was one of the most ancient of the Euboean cities. It occurs in the Catalogue of Ships in the Iliad, where Homer gives it the epithet of πολυστάφυλος (rich in grapes); and the Periplus of Pseudo-Scylax mentions it as one of the four cities of Euboea. It was an important city in classical antiquity due to its strategic location at the entrance of the North Euboean Gulf, in the middle of a large and fertile plain.

After the Battle of Artemisium (480 BC), when the Grecian fleet sailed southwards, Histiaea was occupied by the Persians. Upon the expulsion of the Persians from Greece, Histiaea, with the other Euboean towns, became subject to Attica. In the revolt of Euboea from Athens in 446 BC, we may conclude that Histiaea took a prominent part, since Pericles, upon the reduction of the island, expelled the inhabitants from the city, and peopled it with 2000 Athenian colonists. The expelled Histiaeans were said by Theopompus to have withdrawn to Macedonia, or by Strabo to Thessaly thence they transferred the name Histiaeotis. From this time we find the name of the town changed to Oreus, which was originally a deme dependent upon Histiaea. It is true that Thucydides upon one occasion subsequently calls the town by its ancient name; but he speaks of it as Oreus, in relating the second revolt of Euboea in 411 BC, where he says that it was the only town in the island that remained faithful to Athens. Its territory was called Oria (Ὡρία).

At the end of the Peloponnesian War, Oreus became subject to Sparta; the Athenian colonists were doubtless expelled, and a portion at least of its ancient inhabitants restored; and accordingly we read that this town remained faithful to Sparta and cherished a lasting hatred against Athens. Neogenes, supported by Jason of Pherae, made himself tyrant of Oreus for a time; but he was expelled by Therippidas, the Lacedaemonian commander; and the Athenian Chabrias endeavoured in vain to obtain possession of the town. But shortly afterwards, before the Battle of Leuctra, Oreus revolted from Sparta. Demosthenes describes the conquest of Oreus by Philip II of Macedon in his 341 BC Third Philippic: in the war between Philip and the Athenians, a party in Oreus was friendly to Philip; and by the aid of this monarch Philistides became tyrant of the city; but the Athenians, at the instigation of Demosthenes, sent an expedition against Oreus, which expelled Philistides, and, according to Charax, put him to death.

In consequence of its geographical position and its fortifications, Oreus became an important place in the subsequent wars. In the contest between Antigonus I Monophthalmus and Cassander it was besieged by the latter, who was, however, obliged to retire upon the approach of Ptolemy, the general of Antigonus. In the First Macedonian War between the Romans and Philip V of Macedon, it was betrayed to the former by the commander of the Macedonian garrison in 207 BC. In the Second Macedonian War it was taken by the Romans by assault in 200 BC. Soon afterwards, in 196 BC, it was declared free by Titus Quinctius Flamininus along with the other Grecian states. Pliny the Elder mentions it among the cities of Euboea no longer existent in his time c. 77 CE, but it still occurs in the lists of Ptolemy writing in the second century CE, under the corrupt form of Σωρεός - Soreus or Soreos.

Strabo says that Oreus was situated upon a lofty hill named Drymus. Livy describes it as having two citadels, one overhanging the sea and the other in the middle of the city.

The present towns Oreoi and Istiaia in northern Euboea were named after this city. The city is the title of a titular see of the Roman Catholic Church. Its site is located near the kastro of the modern village of Oreoi.

== See also ==
- List of ancient Greek cities
