= Bulis (mythology) =

Greek mythological person

In Greek mythology, Bulis (Ancient Greek: Βοῦλις, romanized: Boûlis) is a minor figure who partook in accidental incest with her own son, Aegypius.

== Family ==
Bulis married a man named Antheus and had a son, Aegypius.

== Mythology ==
Bulis' son Aegypius became the lover of a much older woman, Timandra. Timandra's son Neophron disapproved of that affair, so in retribution he seduced Bulis himself. One day he brought Bulis into his house, having made sure Timandra was away. He made an excuse for himself and left around the time that Aegypius visited in order to see Timandra. Unaware of each other’s identity, mother and son lay together. When they realized what had happened, Bulis grabbed a sword with the intention to blind him and kill herself. Aegypius prayed to the heavens to make him vanish; and Zeus transformed all four into birds. Bulis herself became a poynx (πώυγξ), perhaps a type of heron (as the word poynx occurs only in Antoninus Liberalis alone), which lives on the eyes of fishes birds and snakes, since she was so fond of taking out eyes.

== See also ==
- Jocasta
- Cinyras

== Bibliography ==
- Antoninus Liberalis, The Metamorphoses of Antoninus Liberalis translated by Francis Celoria (Routledge 1992). Online version at the Topos Text Project.
- Celoria, Francis (1992). The Metamorphoses of Antoninus Liberalis: A Translation with a Commentary. Routledge. ISBN 0-415-06896-7.
