= Amathousa =

Mother of Cinyras in Greek mythology

In Greek mythology, Amathousa or Amathusa (Ancient Greek: Ἀμάθουσα) was the reputed mother of King Cinyras of Cyprus. Otherwise, the latter's parentage was attributed to the following: (1) Sandocus and Pharnace, (2) Eurymedon and the nymph Paphia, (3) Apollo, or lastly, (4) Paphos.

== Mythology ==
The city of Amathus was named after Amathousa by its founder, Cinyras. Alternatively, it was derived from Amathes, son of Heracles who was worshipped there. Adonis was also venerated in this ancient Cypriot city.

In the version of the myth by Plutarch, Theseus abandoned Ariadne at Amathous, where she died giving birth to her child and was buried in a sacred tomb. According to the author's source, Amathousians called the sacred grove where her shrine was situated the Wood of Aphrodite Ariadne.
