= Paphia (mythology) =

Name in Greek mythology

In Greek mythology, Paphia (Ancient Greek: Παφία, romanized: Paphía, lit. 'from Paphos') may refer to the following:

- Paphia, a Cypriot nymph who in one tradition was the mother of Cinyras with Eurymedon. (In other traditions, Cinyras's parentage was alternatively attributed to Sandocus and Pharnace, Amathousa, Apollo, or Paphos.)
- Paphia, an epithet of the goddess Aphrodite. The name derived from the Sanctuary of Aphrodite Paphia in Palaepaphos on the island of Cyprus, the traditional birthplace of the goddess. A statue of Aphrodite Paphia also stood in the sanctuary of Ino, between Oetylus and Thalamae in Laconia.
