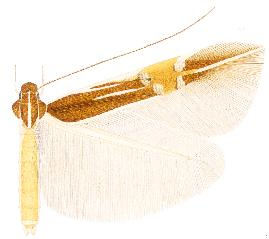

Scientific classification
- Kingdom: Animalia
- Phylum: Arthropoda
- Clade: Pancrustacea
- Class: Insecta
- Order: Lepidoptera
- Family: Cosmopterigidae
- Genus: Cosmopterix
- Species: C. erinome

Binomial name
- Cosmopterix erinome Koster, 2010

= Cosmopterix erinome =

Species of moth

Cosmopterix erinome is a moth of the family Cosmopterigidae. It is known from the United States (Alabama and Mississippi).

Adults have been collected in April, June and August.

== Description ==
Male, female. Forewing length 5.2–5.5 mm. Head: frons shining ochreous-white with greenish and reddish reflections, vertex and neck tufts shining greyish brown with reddish reflection, medially and laterally lined white, collar greyish brown; labial palpus first segment very short, white, second segment fourth-fifths of the length of third, white with a greyish-brown line dorsally and laterally on outside, basal one-third white dorsally, third segment white, lined dark brown laterally; scape dark brown with a white anterior line, white ventrally; antenna shining dark greyish brown, a white line from base to beyond one-half, at two-thirds an indistinct whitish ring of one segment. Thorax and tegulae greyish brown with reddish reflection, thorax with a white median line, tegulae lined white inwardly. Legs: ochreous-grey, femora of midleg and hindleg shining ochreous-white with some greenish reflection, foreleg with a white line on tibia and tarsal segments one to three and five, tibia of midleg with white oblique basal and medial lines and a white apical ring, tarsal segments one and two with very indistinct ochreous-white apical rings, segment five dorsally ochreous-white, tibia of hindleg as midleg, tarsal segments dorsally ochreous-white, spurs dark grey on outside, whitish on inside. Forewing greyish brown with reddish gloss, four rather broad white lines in the basal area, a broad costal from one-sixth to the transverse fascia, widening distally, a subcostal from base to one-third, bending gradually from costa in distal half, often more or less fused with the costal line and hardly noticeable, a slightly oblique medial from one-fifth to the basal protrusion of the transverse fascia, a dorsal from base to the transverse fascia, a yellow to yellow-grey transverse fascia beyond the middle, narrowed towards dorsum and with a small basal protrusion and a narrow apical protrusion in the middle, bordered at inner edge by two tubercular golden metallic subcostal and dorsal spots, the costal spot with a patch of blackish-brown scales on the outside, the dorsal spot further from base than the subcostal, bordered at outer edge by a tubercular golden metallic costal and a dorsal spot, the dorsal spot about one-half to twice the size of the costal, both spots opposite and inwardly edged dark greyish brown, a narrow white costal streak from outer costal spot and a white apical line from the apical protrusion, cilia greyish brown around apex, pale ochreous grey towards dorsum. Hindwing shining pale grey, cilia pale ochreous-grey. Underside: forewing shining pale ochreous-grey, the white apical line indistinctly visible, hindwing shining pale grey, whitish at apex. Abdomen dorsally shining yellow-ochreous, laterally shining grey, ventrally shining yellowish white, anal tuft white in male, yellowish white in female.

== Etymology ==
The species is named after Erinome, a moon of Jupiter. To be treated as a noun in apposition.
