= Astynous =

Several Greek mythological characters

Astynous or Astynoos (Ancient Greek: Ἀστύνοος) is a name that may refer to one of the following characters in Greek mythology:

- Astynous, son of Phaethon, son of Eos. He was the father of King Sandocus of Celendreis who in turn fathered King Cinyras of Cyprus.
- Astynous, a defender of Troy killed by Diomedes.
- Astynous, son of Protiaon and another defender of Troy. Polydamas entrusted to him his horses before going into the battle. Astynous was killed by Neoptolemus during the Trojan War.
