= Xerias (Euboea) =

River on Euboea island, Greece

The Xerias (Greek: Ξερίας, from ξερός, "dry") is a river of northern Euboea, Greece. Anciently, it was known as the Callas or Kallas (Ancient Greek: Κάλλας) which flowed into the sea near Oreus. The Kremasi Waterfall is on this river near the village of Milies.
