= Myrrh (disambiguation) =

Myrrh is a natural gum or resin extracted from a number of small, thorny tree species of the genus Commiphora.

Myrrh may also refer to:

- Abyssinian myrrh (Commiphora habessinica), a shrub or tree
- African myrrh (Commiphora africana), a deciduous tree
- Myrrh, a common name of cicely, a perennial plant in the celery family
- Myrrh (album), by Robin Williamson (1972)
- Myrrh Records, an American Christian music record label

== See also ==
- Gold, frankincense, and myrrh, the gifts of the Biblical Magi
- Gold, Frankincense and Myrrh, a 1971 Croatian film
- Myrrha (disambiguation)
- Myrrhbearers, the individuals mentioned in the New Testament who were directly involved in the burial of Jesus or who discovered the empty tomb
- Myrrh-streaming, a title of some Eastern Orthodox saints
- Opopanax (perfumery), or sweet myrrh
