= Amathes =

Ancient Greek mythological figure

The moth genus Amathes is nowadays usually included in Xestia.

Amathes (Ancient Greek: Ἀμάθης) was, in Greek mythology, a son of Heracles, from whom the town of Amathus in Cyprus was believed to have derived its name. According to some traditions, however, its name was derived from Amathusa, the mother of Cinyras.
