= Timandra (mother of Neophron) =

Greek mythological person

In Greek mythology, Timandra (Ancient Greek: Τιμάνδρα) is a widow woman who became the lover of Aegypius.

== Mythology ==
Her son Neophron disapproved of the affair, so he seduced Aegypius' own mother Bulis. He brought Bulis into his house, made sure his own mother was out, and then arranged for Aegypius and Bulis to sleep together, unsuspecting of the other's true identity. The moment they found out the trick, Aegypius prayed that he would vanish, and Zeus turned all four into birds. Timandre changed into an aegithalos (αἰγίθηλος), now the word for "long-tailed tit", but the Greek bird may have also been any of the Paridae.

== Bibliography ==
- Antoninus Liberalis, The Metamorphoses of Antoninus Liberalis translated by Francis Celoria (Routledge 1992). Online version at the Topos Text Project.
- Celoria, Francis (1992). The Metamorphoses of Antoninus Liberalis: A Translation with a Commentary. Routledge. ISBN 0-415-06896-7.
