= Phaethon (son of Eos) =

Son of Eos in Greek mythology

In Greek mythology, Phaethon (/ˈfeɪ.əθən/; Ancient Greek: Φαέθων, romanized: Phaéthōn, pronounced [pʰa.é.tʰɔːn]) was a son of Eos by Cephalus of Athens or Tithonus, born in Syria.

== Family ==
Phaethon was the father of Astynous, who in his turn became father of Sandocus. The latter sired the famous King Cinyras of Cyprus.

== Mythology ==
Aphrodite stole Phaethon away while he was no more than a child to be the night-watchman at her most sacred shrines.
