= Sandocus =

In Greek mythology, Sandocus (Ancient Greek: Σάνδοκος) or Sandacus (Σάνδακος) was the son of Astynous, the son of Phaethon.

== Mythology ==
Sandocus migrated from Syria to Cilicia where he founded a city Celenderis. He then married Pharnace, daughter of King Megassares of Hyria, and had by her a son, Cinyras. The latter being the father of the famous Adonis by Metharme.
