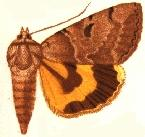

Scientific classification
- Kingdom: Animalia
- Phylum: Arthropoda
- Class: Insecta
- Order: Lepidoptera
- Superfamily: Noctuoidea
- Family: Erebidae
- Genus: Catocala
- Species: C. nuptialis

Binomial name
- Catocala nuptialis Walker, 1858

Synonyms
- Catocala myrrha Strecker, 1874

= Catocala nuptialis =

Married underwing

Species of moth

Catocala nuptialis, the married underwing, is a moth of the family Erebidae. The species was first described by Francis Walker in 1858. It is found in North America from Manitoba south through Minnesota and Nebraska to eastern Oklahoma and Texas and east to Kentucky and Illinois.

The wingspan is 40–50 mm. Adults are on wing from June to September depending on the location. There is probably one generation per year.

The larvae feed on Amorpha canescens.
