= Aegypius (mythology) =

Greek mythical character

In Greek mythology, Aegypius (Ancient Greek: Αἰγυπιός) was a Thessalian son of Antheus (son of Nomion) and Bulis. He was the lover of Timandra, a widow.

== Mythology ==
Timandra's son, Neophron, resented this relationship, and plotted against it by seducing Bulis (Βοῦλ-ις, -ιδος). Neophron took Bulis to his house, having arranged for his mother to be out, and excused himself just when he knew Aegypius was accustomed to come visit Timandre; thus arranging for mother and son to sleep together, each believing the other someone else. Afterwards, Aegypius fell asleep, and Bulis recognized him. She grabbed a sword, and was just about to blind Aegypius and kill herself, when Aegypius woke up. Apollo restored Aegypius's vision long enough for him to realize what had happened and changed all four of them into birds. The men became vultures, Timandra a sparrow-hawk, and Bulis a long-beaked bird that pecks out the eyes of fish. Grasping the situation, including Neophron's trick, he prayed to the gods to abolish all four of them. Zeus heard his prayer, and answered by turning Aegypius and Neophron into vultures; Bulis into a pounx (πώυγξ) (perhaps a heron), which lives on the eyes of fishes birds and snakes, since she was so fond of taking out eyes; and Timandre into an aegithalos (αἰγίθηλος), now the word for "long-tailed tit", but the Greek bird may also be any of the Paridae.
