= Théodore Edme Mionnet =

French numismatist

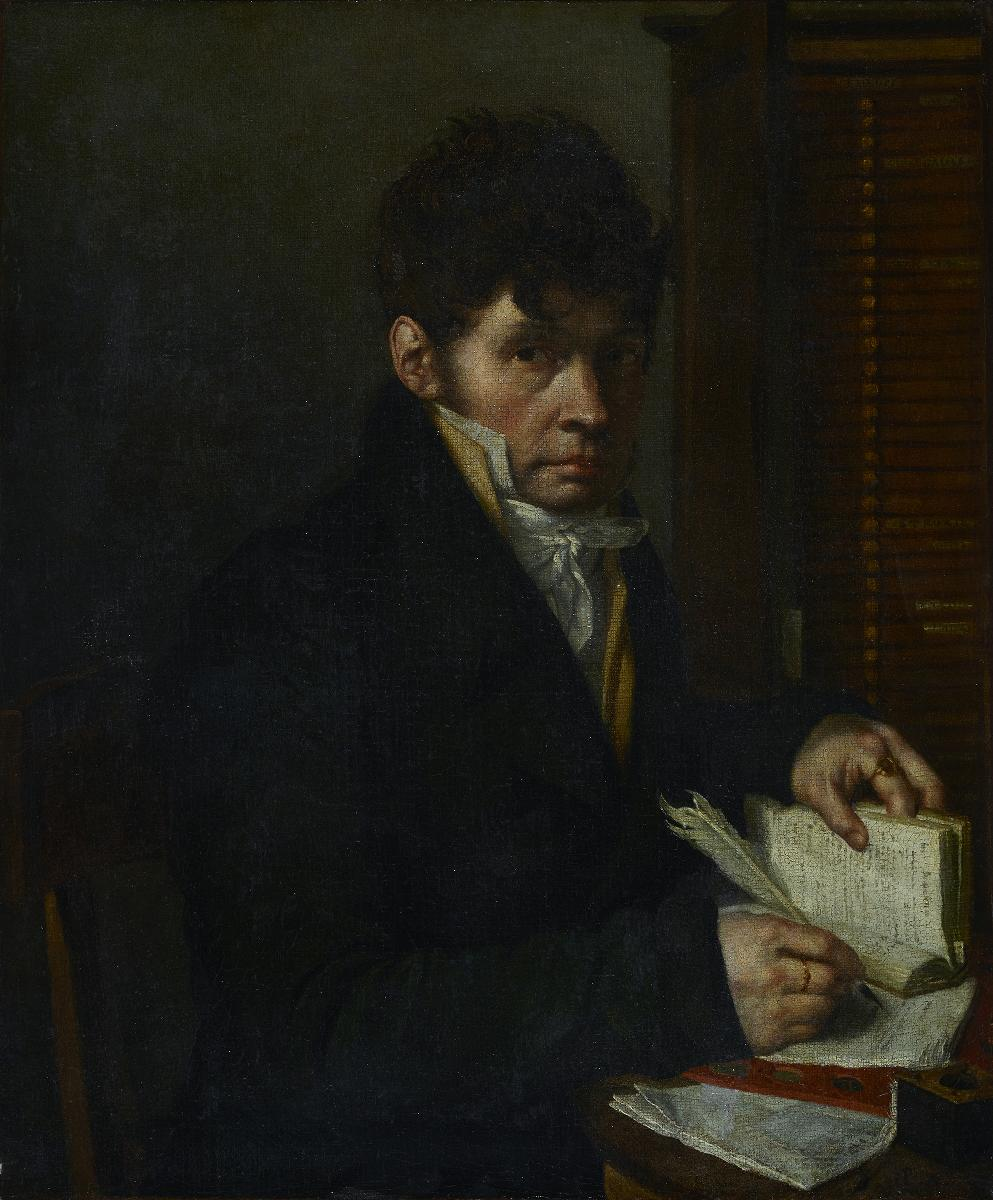
Portrait by Amable Louis Claude Pagnest, c. 1810

Théodore Edme Mionnet (1770–1842) was a French numismatist.

== Biography ==
Mionnet was born in Paris, where he studied in the Collège du Cardinal le Moine, and in the École de droit. After four years of legal practice and a short term in the army, from which he retired because of illness, he became assistant in 1800 in the numismatic cabinet in the Bibliothèque Nationale, and there began to catalogue the collections. He traveled in Italy, made many valuable numismatic finds, and in 1830 was elected to the Academy of Inscriptions.

== Works ==
- Description des médailles antiques, grecques et romaines (1806–30, in 17 vols.)
- De la rareté et du prix des médailles romaines (1815; 3d ed. 1847)
