= Trophonius =

Greek mythological character

Trophonius on an ancient Greek limestone relief from Boeotia, c. 350–25 BC, National Archaeological Museum of Greece.

Trophonius (/trəˈfoʊniəs/; Ancient Greek: Τροφώνιος, romanized: Trophṓnios) was a Greek hero or minor deity with a rich mythological tradition and an oracular cult at Lebadea (Ancient Greek: Λεβάδεια) in Boeotia, Greece.

== Etymology and parallel cults ==
The name is derived from τρέφω trepho, "to nourish". Strabo and several inscriptions refer to him as Zeus Trephonios. Several other chthonic Zeuses are known from the Greek world, including Zeus Μειλίχιος Meilikhios ("honeyed" or "kindly" Zeus), and Zeus Χθόνιος Chthonios ("Zeus beneath-the-earth"), which were other names for Hades.

== Mythology ==
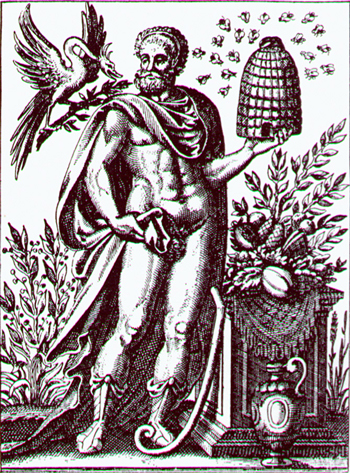
Trofonio (Trophonius (Τροφώνιος), Historia Deorum Fatidicorum, Geneva, 1675.

=== Family ===
In the Homeric Hymn to Apollo, Trophonius is a son of Erginus (the king of Minyan Orchomenus) and brother of Agamedes. Pausanias gives his father as Apollo.

=== Temple of Apollo ===
According to the Homeric Hymn to Apollo, Trophonius, along with Agamedes, built Apollo's temple at the oracle at Delphi. Pindar relates how, once finished, the oracle told the brothers to do whatsoever they wished for six days and, on the seventh, they would get their reward. They did, and were found dead on the seventh day. Cicero mentions the same story, only shortening the number of days to three. Menander's maxim "those whom the gods love die young" may have come from this story.

=== Treasury of King Hyrieus ===
Alternatively, according to Pausanias they built a treasure chamber (with a secret entrance only they knew about) for King Hyrieus of Boeotia. Using the secret entrance, they stole Hyrieus' fortune. The king was aware but did not know who the thief was; he laid a snare. Agamedes was trapped in it; Trophonius cut off his head so that Hyrieus would not know whose body it was. He was then immediately swallowed up by the earth and was turned into an immortal subterranean god.

The cave of Trophonius was not discovered again until the Lebadaeans suffered a plague and consulted the Delphic Oracle. The Pythia advised them that an unnamed hero was angry at being neglected, and that they should find his grave and offer him worship forthwith. Several unsuccessful searches followed, and the plague continued unabated until a shepherd boy followed a trail of bees into a hole in the ground. Instead of honey, he found a daimon, and Lebadaea lost its plague while gaining a popular oracle.

=== Other myths ===
The childless Xuthus in Euripides's Ion consults Trophonius on his way to Delphi.

Apollonius of Tyana, a legendary wise man and seer of Late Antiquity, once visited the shrine and found that, when it came to philosophy, Trophonius was a proponent of sound Pythagorean doctrines.

Plutarch's De Genio Socratis relates an elaborate dream-vision concerning the cosmos and the afterlife that was supposedly received at Trophonius' oracle.

== Cult ==
Pausanias, in his account of Boeotia (9.39), relates many details about the cult of Trophonius. Whoever desired to consult the oracle would live in a designated house for a period of days, bathing in the River Herkryna (also Erkina), named after his daughter who was a childhood friend of Persephone's, and living on sacrificial meat. He would then sacrifice, by day, to a series of gods, including Cronus, Apollo, Zeus the king, Hera the Charioteer, and Demeter-Europa. At night, he would cast a ram into a pit sacred to Agamedes, drink from two rivers called Lethe and Mnemosyne, and then descend into a cave. Here, most worshippers were frightened out of their wits, and forgot the experience entirely upon coming up.

Afterward, the worshipper would be seated upon a chair of Mnemosyne, where the priests of the shrine would record his ravings and compose an oracle out of them.

== In the classical tradition ==
"To descend into the cave of Trophonios" became a proverbial way of saying "to suffer a great fright". This saying is alluded to in Aristophanes' Clouds.

Several ancient philosophers, including Heraclides Ponticus, wrote commentaries on the cult of Trophonios that are now lost. Trophonios has been of interest to classical scholars because the rivers of Lethe and Mnemosyne have close parallels with the Myth of Er at the end of Plato's Republic, with a series of Orphic funerary inscriptions on gold leaves, and with several passages about Memory and forgetting in Hesiod's Theogony. The Hellfire Club once constructed a "Cave of Trophonius" with obscene wall-paintings in which to conduct their revels. The philosopher Søren Kierkegaard references "the cave of Trophonius" when discussing his childhood and later philosophical revelations in his work Either/Or. The philosopher Friedrich Nietzsche makes a reference to "Trophonius" in the preface to his Daybreak, alluding to his labor in the "underground" of moral prejudices.
