= Erinome =

Retrograde irregular satellite of Jupiter

- Erinome imaged by the Canada-France-Hawaii Telescope in December 2001

Discovery
- Discovered by: Scott S. Sheppard; David C. Jewitt; Yanga R. Fernandez; Eugene A. Magnier
- Discovery site: Mauna Kea Observatory
- Discovery date: 23 November 2000

Designations
- Designation: Jupiter XXV
- Named after: Erinoma (Greek form unknown) (Note: See the summary in C. M. C. Green (2007) Roman Religion and the Cult of Diana at Aricia, page 214, fn. 7, and a fuller account in Joseph Fontenrose (1981) Orion: The Myth of the Hunter and the Huntress, pages 170–172)
- Alternative names: S/2000 J 4

Orbital characteristics
- Epoch 17 December 2020 (JD 2459200.5)
- Observation arc: 22 years 2022-09-02 (last obs)
- Semi-major axis: 0.1494286 AU (22,354,200 km)
- Eccentricity: 0.2052559
- Orbital period (sidereal): –682.80 d
- Mean anomaly: 98.99686°
- Mean motion: 0° 31^{m} 38.062^{s} / day
- Inclination: 164.81976° (to ecliptic)
- Longitude of ascending node: 34.02660°
- Argument of perihelion: 81.11760°
- Satellite of: Jupiter
- Group: Carme group

Physical characteristics
- Mean diameter: 3 km
- Albedo: 0.04 (assumed)
- Spectral type: B–V = 0.72 ± 0.06, V–R = 0.42 ± 0.04
- Apparent magnitude: 22.8
- Absolute magnitude (H): 16.0

Erinome, also known as Jupiter XXV, is a retrograde irregular satellite of Jupiter. It was discovered by a team of astronomers from the University of Hawaiʻi led by Scott S. Sheppard in 2000, and given the temporary designation S/2000 J 4.

Erinome is about 3 kilometres in diameter, and orbits Jupiter at an average distance of 22,986,000 km in 682.80 days, at an inclination of 164° to the ecliptic (162° to Jupiter's equator), in a retrograde direction and with an eccentricity of 0.2552.

It belongs to the Carme group, made up of irregular retrograde moons orbiting Jupiter at a distance ranging between 23 and 24 million km and at an inclination of about 165°.

== Name ==
Erinome was named in October 2002 after the mythological Erinoma, a Cypriot woman said by the discovery group to be a "daughter of Celes, compelled by Venus to fall in love with Jupiter." In the surviving myths however, it is actually Jupiter (Zeus) whom Venus (Aphrodite) makes fall in love with Erinoma, in order to ruin her.

The final -a vowel of the name was changed to -e to accord with IAU naming conventions for retrograde moons. The story is only known in Latin, and manuscripts have the name as Erinoma, Erinona and Erittoma. The original Greek name, and thus the stressed syllable in Latin, is unknown. It might be a late corruption of Eurynome, in which case the stress would be on the third syllable (/ɛrɪˈnəmiː/?). Since there is no moon named 'Eurynome' as of 2025, this would not be ambiguous.
