= 381 Myrrha =

Main-belt asteroid

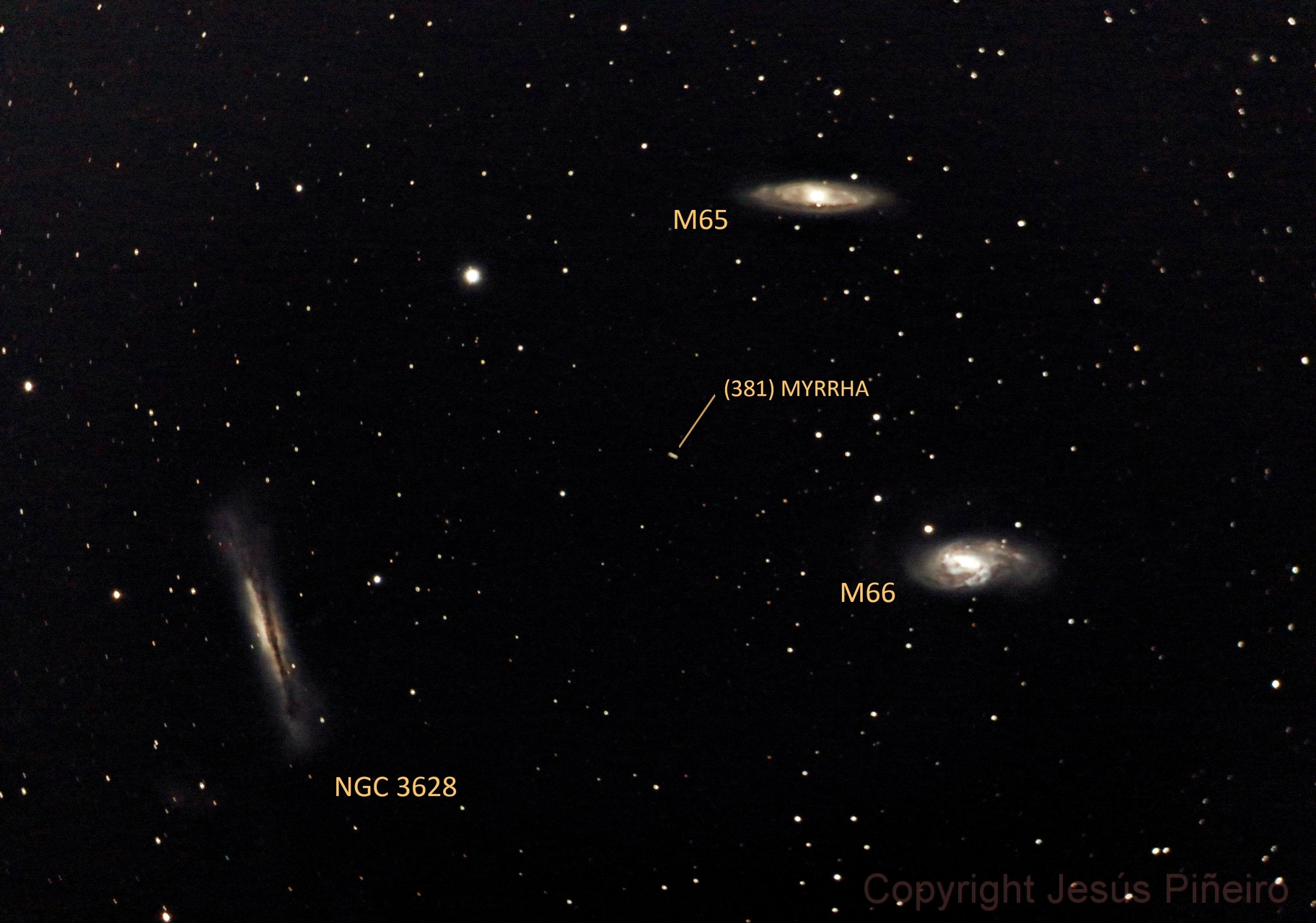
- 381 Myrrha photographed in the constellation of Leo, with Messier 65, Messier 66 and NGC 3628 nearby

Discovery
- Discovered by: Auguste Charlois
- Discovery date: 10 January 1894

Designations
- Pronunciation: /ˈmɪrə, ˈmɜːrə/
- Named after: Myrrha
- Alternative designations: 1894 AS
- Minor planet category: Main belt

Orbital characteristics
- Epoch 31 July 2016 (JD 2457600.5)
- Aphelion: 3.5124 AU (525.45 Gm)
- Perihelion: 2.93357 AU (438.856 Gm)
- Semi-major axis: 3.22298 AU (482.151 Gm)
- Eccentricity: 0.089797
- Orbital period (sidereal): 5.79 yr (2113.4 d)
- Mean anomaly: 350.739°
- Mean motion: 0° 10^{m} 13.224^{s} / day
- Inclination: 12.558°
- Longitude of ascending node: 125.102°
- Argument of perihelion: 142.930°

Physical characteristics
- Dimensions: 147.2×126.6 km
- Mean diameter: 134.8+45.3 −12.8 km (LCI + occ); 131±4 km (thermophysical)
- Mass: (1.81±0.58)×10^{18} kg (Note: Calculated from its standard gravitational parameter GM = 0.121±0.039 km^{3}/s^{2}.)
- Mean density: 1.41/1.54 g/cm^{3} (calculated)
- Synodic rotation period: 6.571953+0.000003 −0.000004 h
- Pole ecliptic longitude: 237°+3° −5°
- Pole ecliptic latitude: 82°+3° −13°
- Geometric albedo: 0.064±0.004
- Spectral type: C
- Absolute magnitude (H): 8.38

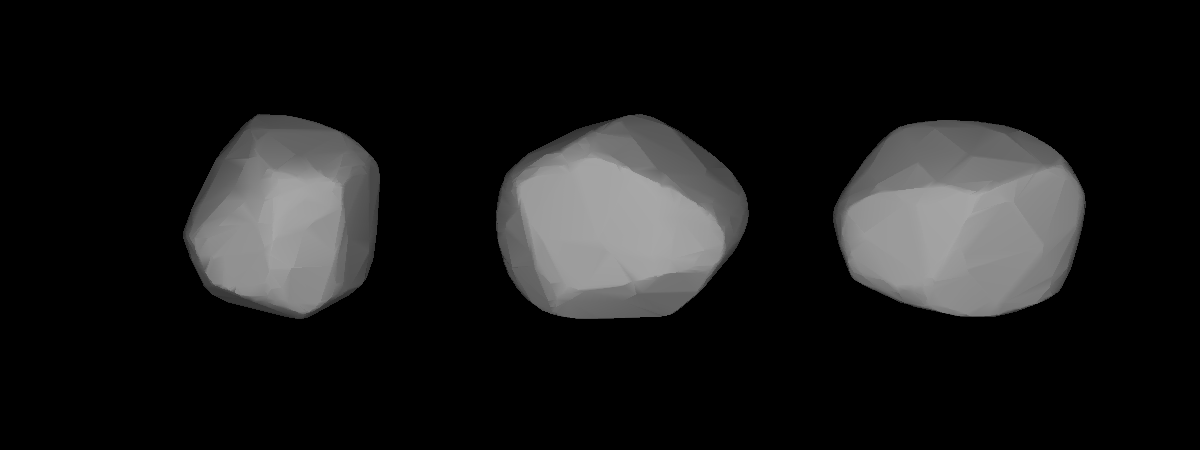
Lightcurve-based 3D model of 381 Myrrha

381 Myrrha is a main-belt asteroid that was discovered by the French astronomer Auguste Charlois on January 10, 1894, in Nice. It has been classified as a C-type asteroid and is most likely composed of carbonaceous material.

Photometric observations of this asteroid at the Oakley Observatory in Terre Haute, Indiana during 2006 gave a light curve with a period of 6.572 ± 0.002 hours and a brightness variation of 0.34 ± 0.05 in magnitude.

10μ radiometric data collected from Kitt Peak in 1975 gave a diameter estimate of 126 km. An occultation of the star Alhena (γ Geminorum) by Myrrha was observed in Japan and China on January 13, 1991, allowing the size and shape of Myrrha to be properly clarified.
