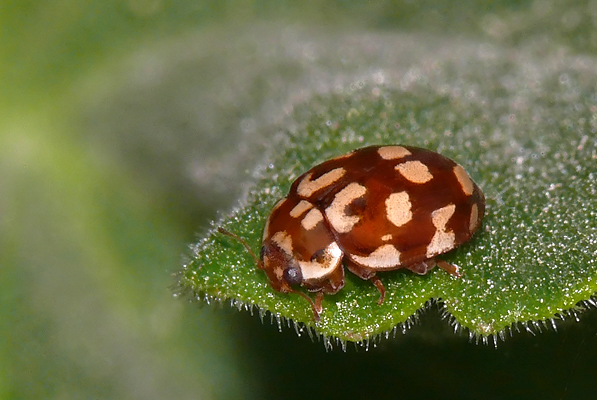

Scientific classification
- Kingdom: Animalia
- Phylum: Arthropoda
- Clade: Pancrustacea
- Class: Insecta
- Order: Coleoptera
- Suborder: Polyphaga
- Infraorder: Cucujiformia
- Family: Coccinellidae
- Genus: Myrrha
- Species: M. octodecimguttata

Binomial name
- Myrrha octodecimguttata (Linnaeus, 1758)

Subspecies
- M. o. octodecimguttata (Linnaeus, 1758); M. o. formosa (Costa, 1849)

= Eighteen-spotted ladybird =

Species of beetle

The eighteen-spotted ladybird (Myrrha octodecimguttata), or 18-spot ladybird, is a species of beetle in the genus Myrrha in the ladybird family that lives primarily in pine forests and mixed (deciduous/conifer) forests inhabiting the upper part of the canopy and feeding on aphids. They favour old pines and breed in the crowns of pine trees in Germany M. octodecimguttata also occurs on high bogs (West Siberian Plain, East Siberian taiga) Adults overwinter in aggregations under peeled-off bark and in crevices at the bases of old pine trunks. It is usually 4 to 5 millimetres (0.16 to 0.20 in) in length.

== Distribution ==
Europe, North Africa. European Russia, the Caucasus, Siberia, the Russian Far East, Belarus, Ukraine, Transcaucasia, Kazakhstan, Western Asia, Mongolia.
