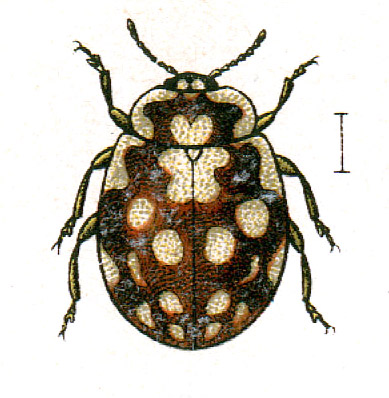

Scientific classification
- Kingdom: Animalia
- Phylum: Arthropoda
- Clade: Pancrustacea
- Class: Insecta
- Order: Coleoptera
- Suborder: Polyphaga
- Infraorder: Cucujiformia
- Family: Coccinellidae
- Genus: Myrrha; Mulsant, 1846

= Myrrha (beetle) =

Genus of beetles

Myrrha is a genus of ladybirds originally defined by French entomologist Étienne Mulsant in his 1846 monograph of the ladybird family Coccinellidae. One species, Myrrha octodecimguttata, is found in Europe.
