= Smyrna (mythology) =

In Greek mythology, Smyrna (/ˈsmɜːrnə/ SMUR-nə; Ancient Greek: Σμύρνα, romanized: Smúrna, lit. 'myrrh') can refer to either of the following figures:

- Smyrna, also called Myrrha, the daughter of Cenchreis and Cinyras or Theias, and mother of Adonis by her own father.
- Smyrna, the Amazon queen who took possession of Ephesus and gave her name to the city of Smyrna.
- Smyrna, the wife of a Thessalian man named Theseus (a grandson of Admetus) who gave his wife's name to the city in order to make her name immortal.

== Bibliography ==
- Antoninus Liberalis, The Metamorphoses of Antoninus Liberalis translated by Francis Celoria (Routledge 1992). Online version at the Topos Text Project.
- Apollodorus, The Library, with an English Translation by Sir James George Frazer, F.B.A., F.R.S. in 2 Volumes. Cambridge, MA, Harvard University Press; London, William Heinemann Ltd. 1921. Online version at the Perseus Digital Library.
- Hyginus, Gaius Julius, The Myths of Hyginus, edited and translated by Mary A. Grant, Lawrence: University of Kansas Press, 1960. Available on Topos Text.
- Pseudo-Herodotus, Life of Homer, translated into English by Theodore Alois Buckley, London 1851. Available on the Internet Archive.
- Pseudo-Plutarch, Parallela Minora in The Moralia, with an English Translation by Frank Cole Babbitt. Cambridge, MA. Harvard University Press. London. William Heinemann Ltd. 1936. 4. Online version at topos text.
- Strabo, The Geography of Strabo, edition by H.L. Jones. Cambridge, Mass.: Harvard University Press; London: William Heinemann, Ltd. 1924. Online version at the Perseus Digital Library.
