= Hestiaea (Attica) =

Coordinates: 38°00′25″N 23°48′50″E

Hestiaea or Hestiaia (Ancient Greek: Ἑστιαία), also known as Histiaea or Histiaia (Ἱστίαια), was a deme of ancient Attica located northeast of Athens, near the modern Tsako, near Cholargos.

Very little is known of Hestiaea. According to Strabo its citizens originally founded the homonymous city in the north of the island Euboea.
