= Hyrieus =

King in Greek mythology

In Greek mythology, Hyrieus (/ˈhɪriˌuːs/; Ancient Greek: Ὑριεύς) was the eponym of Hyria in Boeotia, where he dwelt and where Orion (see below) was born; some sources though place him either in Thrace or on Chios. Most accounts speak of him as a king, although Ovid and Nonnus portray him as a peasant.

== Family ==
Hyrieus was the son of Alcyone and Poseidon, brother of Hyperenor and Aethusa. By the nymph Clonia, he became the father of Nycteus and Lycus. According to later sources, Hyrieus was also the father of Orion, but according to Ovid, his wife had died childless. According to the 12th-century Byzantine scholar Eustathius, Hyrieus was the father of the nymph Histiaea.

One source calls Hyrieus the father of Crinacus, father of King Macareus of Lesbos.

== Mythology ==
=== Treasury ===
Hyrieus hired Trophonius and Agamedes to build a treasure chamber for him but they also built a secret entrance to it, so that the treasury was easily accessible by removing just one stone from the outside. Using the secret entrance, they would come and steal some of Hyrieus' possessions. He was dumbfounded at discovering that his fortune was diminishing while the locks and seals remained intact; to catch the thief, he laid a snare. Agamedes was trapped in it; Trophonius cut off his brother's head so that Hyrieus would never know the thief's identity, and himself disappeared in a chasm of the earth.

=== Orion ===
Some speak of Hyrieus as Orion's natural father; others relate that he was childless and a widower and became (technically) adoptive father of Orion via the following circumstances. He was visited by Zeus and Hermes (some add Poseidon), who, to express gratitude for his hospitality, promised him to fulfill a wish of his; he said that he wanted children. The gods filled a sacrificial bull's hide with their urine, then told Hyrieus to bury it. Nine months later, Hyrieus found a newborn baby boy inside and named him Orion; Roman authors thought of the Latin word urina "urine" as an etymon for Orion's name (though actually his name is obviously not of Latin origin). Nonnus, on account of this story, refers to Orion as "having three fathers" and to Gaea (Earth) as his mother.

=== Other myths ===
Hyrieus was said to have expelled Euonymus from the temple of Apollo.
