= Lactantius Placidus =

4th century Roman writer

Lactantius Placidus (c. 350 – c. 400 AD) was the presumed author of a commentary on Statius's poem Thebaid. Wilhelm Siegmund Teuffel considered him to be the same person as Luctatius Placidus, the ostensible author of a medieval Latin glossary titled Glossae Luctatii Placidi grammatici ("Glosses of Luctatius Placidus the Grammarian"). Some authors also attribute an anonymous work titled Narrationes fabularum quae in Ov. Metam. occurrunt to Lactantius, though Franz Bretzigheimer argued against this view, on the basis that the commentator on Statius lacks evidence of Christian attitudes seen in the Narrationes.

The commentary on Statius has been edited by Robert Dale Sweeney, Lactantii Placidi in Statii Thebaida commentum. Vol. 1: Anonymi in Statii Achilleida commentum. Fulgentii ut fingitur Planciadis super Thebaiden commentariolum. Teubner, Stuttgart 1997 (Bibliotheca scriptorum Graecorum et Romanorum Teubneriana), ISBN 3-8154-1823-2.

== Bibliography ==
- Lactantii Placidi qui dicitur Commentarios in Statii Thebaida et Commentarium in Achilleida recensuit Ricardus Jahnke, Lipsiae, in aedibus B. G. Teubneri, 1898.
- Lactantius Placidus in Statii Thebaida commentum, vol. 1, R. D. Sweeney (ed.), Stutgardiae et Lipsiae, in aedibus B. G. Teubneri, 1997.
