= Cinyras =

Mythical founder of the city of Paphos in Greek mythology

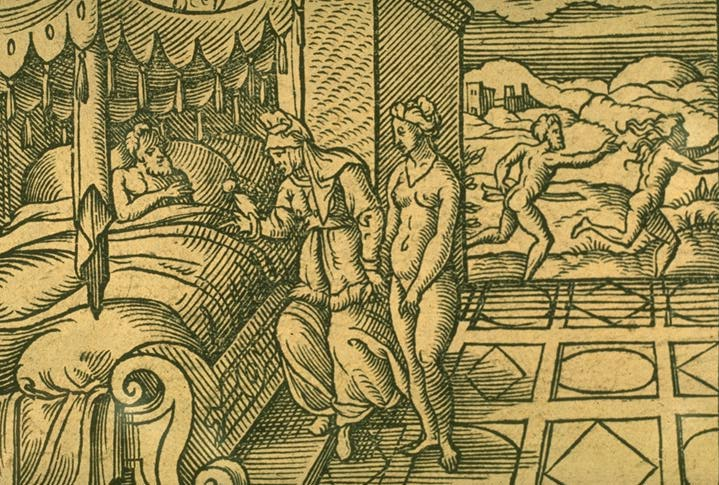
Myrrha and Cinyras. Engraving by Virgil Solis for Ovid's Metamorphoses

In Greek mythology, Cinyras (/ˈsɪnɪrəs/; Ancient Greek: Κινύρας – Kinyras) was a famous hero and king of Cyprus. Mythical accounts and genealogies vary among sources. In many sources he is associated with the cult of Aphrodite on Cyprus and is said to be the father of Adonis. Some scholars have proposed a connection with the minor Ugaritic deity Kinnaru, the god of the lyre. The city Cinyreia on Cyprus was believed to have taken its name from Cinyras. According to Strabo, he had previously ruled in the city of Byblos in Phoenicia.

== Mythical biography ==
The name Cinyras does not appear again until he is mentioned by Pindar as "beloved of Apollo," and the priest of Aphrodite. Pindar mentions Cinyras as being fabulously rich in Nemean Ode 8 line 18.

Later, in Greek and Roman literature and in the Christian fathers such as Clement of Alexandria, the story of Cinyras is elaborated. They say that on Cyprus, Cinyras was revered as the creator of art and of musical instruments, such as the flute. In one source, he is also noted for his physical beauty. It is believed that his name comes from the Phoenician word kinnor (Greek: κινύρα) – an eastern string instrument. It is quite possible that it was a deliberate play on words, because the legend says that Cinyras was a singer and he posed a musical challenge to Apollo and tested his abilities, for which the god Mars took his life.

If Cinyras was the Cinyra, mentioned by Pliny, who was the son of Agriopas and a Cyprian, he was credited with inventing tiles and discovering copper-mines, both of which were found in the island. He was also regarded as the inventor of tongs, the hammer, the lever, and the anvil.

== Heroic genealogy ==
According to the Bibliotheca, Cinyras was a descendant of Eos and Cephalus. His parents were Sandocus, son of Astynous (himself son of Phaethon), and Pharnace, daughter of King Megassares of Hyria. Cinyras' father, Sandocus was an immigrant from Syria who settled in Cilicia and founded a city Celenderis. Cinyras upon his arrival in Cyprus with some of his people, founded the town of Paphos and married Metharme, daughter of King Pygmalion of Cyprus. His children according to Pseudo-Apollodorus were Adonis and Oxyporos, and also daughters Braesia, Laogora and Orsedice. These maidens, by reason of the wrath of Aphrodite, cohabited with foreigners, and ended their life in Egypt. Another daughter, Laodice who married Elatus, son of Arcas, and had by him two sons Stymphalus and Pereus.

Pausanias mentions a daughter of Cinyras as the consort of Teucer, who is known to have received the kingdom of Cyprus from Belus of Tyre for having assisted him in the invasion of the island. Her name is not given in Pausanias' account, but Tzetzes writes that Teucer married Eune "daughter of Cyprus".

Stephanus of Byzantium informs us that Cinyras' mother was named Amathousa, and it was either from her or Amathous, a son of Heracles, that Amathous, the oldest city of Cyprus, received its name. Stephanus also mentions three otherwise unknown children of Cinyras: a daughter Cyprus, who had the island named after her, and two sons, Koureus and Marieus, eponyms of the towns Kourion and Marion respectively.

Hesychius says Cinyras was a son of Apollo, while Hyginus consistently calls him a son of Paphos, and a scholiast on Pindar makes him a son of Eurymedon and the nymph Paphia. In other sources, he is the husband of Galatea. Cinyras was also called the father of Myrrha. Hesychius also mentions a daughter of Cinyras, Myrice who mourned so much she was transformed into a tamarisk tree.

Another son, Amaracus, who served as the royal perfumer of the court is mentioned by Servius.

Comparative table of Cinyras family
Relation	Names	Source						
Relation	Names	Scholia on Pindar	Apollodorus	Ovid	Pausanias	Hyginus	Stephanus	Hesychius
Parentage	Eurymedon and Paphia	✓						
Parentage	Sandocus and Pharnace		✓					
Parentage	Paphos			✓		✓		
Parentage	Amathousa						✓	
Parentage	Apollo							✓
Consort	Metharme		✓					
Consort	Cenchreis			✓				
Children	Adonis		✓	✓				
Children	Oxyporos		✓					
Children	Braesia		✓					
Children	Laogora		✓					
Children	Orsedice		✓					
Children	Laodice		✓					
Children	Myrrha			✓				
Children	a daughter, consort of Teucer				✓			
Children	Cyprus						✓	
Children	Koureus						✓	
Children	Marieus						✓	

== Mythical accounts ==
=== Trojan War ===
In the earliest testimony for this character in ancient Greek literature (the account of Homer), Cinyras was a ruler on Cyprus who gave a corselet to Agamemnon as a guest-gift when he heard that the Greeks were planning to sail to Troy. Eustathius in his commentary on this passage relates that Cinyras promised assistance to Agamemnon, but did not keep his word: having promised to send fifty ships, he actually sent only one commanded by the son of Mygdalion, while the rest were sculpted from earth, with figures of men (also made of earth) imitating the crew. He was cursed by Agamemnon and subsequently punished by Apollo, who beat him in a musical contest (similar to that between Apollo and Marsyas, to see who was a better musician with a lyre) and killed him, whereupon Cinyras' fifty daughters threw themselves into the sea and were changed into sea birds (alcyones).

=== Myrrha ===
According to Ovid, Cinyras' daughter Myrrha, impelled by an unnatural lust for her own father (in retribution for her mother Cenchreis' hubris), slept with him, became pregnant, and asked the gods to change her into something other than human; she became a tree from whose bark myrrh drips. From this incestuous union sprang the child Adonis. Cinyras was said to have committed suicide over the matter. Other authors equate Cinyras and Myrrha with king Theias of Assyria and his daughter Smyrna, and relate the same story of them. Hyginus uses the name Cinyras for the father, but Smyrna for the daughter.

Xenophon of Cyprus, authored Cypriaca (Κυπριακά; "Cypriot Histories"), a now-lost work that narrated erotic stories about Cinyras, Myrrha and Adonis.

=== Cinyras and the priesthood of Paphian Aphrodite ===
In his Histories, Tacitus (AD 56–120) relates the account of divination rites at the famous Sanctuary of Aphrodite Paphia. According to one tradition, the sanctuary was founded by King Aerias; others say that Cinyras built the sanctuary at the spot where the goddess first stepped on the land after her birth from the sea.

Here Tacitus describes him as having come to Cyprus from Cilicia where he had introduced the worship of Paphian Aphrodite. The divination practices at the temple are said to have been introduced by Tamiras of Cilicia. The office of priesthood became hereditary in the families of both Cinyras (Cinyradae) and Tamiras; the descendants of Tamiras were eventually displaced by those of the Cinyras. By Tacitus's time, only the priest of Cinyras' line was consulted.

The early Christian theologian Clement of Alexandria (c. 150–c. 215) mentions the "Cyprian Islander Cinyras, who dared to bring forth from night to the light of day the lewd orgies of Aphrodite in his eagerness to deify a strumpet of his own country" in his Protrepticus.

== See also ==
- Kothar wa-Khasis
