= Hyria (Boeotia) =

Coordinates: 38°27′25″N 23°33′53″E

Hyria (Ionic Greek: Ὑρίη, Hyriē; Koine Greek: Ὑρία, Hyria) is a toponym mentioned in Homer's Catalogue of Ships, where the leading position in the list is given to the contingents from Boeotia, where Hyria and stony Aulis, where the fleet assembled, lead the list.

The site was assigned to the territory of Tanagra by Strabo, who is not more precise about its location, which was apparently no longer inhabited in his time. Pausanias does not mention it. Modern identifications of the site near Aulis place it near Megalo Vouno, on a mound of the coastal plain near the beach of Drámesi (Παραλία Αυλίδος (τέως Δράμεσι)), where the surface is strewn with Late Helladic pottery sherds and excavation has revealed Early Mycenaean pottery from a tomb.

There lived a childless king called Hyrieus, who had prayed to the gods for a son. Zeus, Poseidon and Hermes, visitors in disguise responded by urinating on a bull's hide and burying it in the earth which produced a child. He was named Orion—as if "of the urine"— after the unusual event.

Like some other archaic names of Greek cities, such as Athenai or Mycenae, the form Hyria is a plural form: its name would once had evoked the place of "the sisters of the beehive", if Hesychius's Glossai, is correct in stating that the Cretan word ὕρον - hyron (singular) meant 'swarm of bees' or 'beehive'. Through his "beehive" birthplace Orion is linked to Potnia, the Minoan-Mycenaean "Mistress" older than Demeter—who was herself sometimes called "the pure Mother Bee". Winged, armed with toxin, creators of the fermentable honey (see mead), seemingly parthenogenetic in their immortal hive, bees functioned as emblems of other embodiments of the Great Mother: Cybele, Rhea the Earth Mother, and the archaic Artemis as honored at Ephesus. Pindar remembered that the Pythian pre-Olympic priestess of Delphi remained "the Delphic bee" long after Apollo had usurped the ancient oracle and shrine. The Homeric Hymn to Apollo acknowledges that Apollo's gift of prophecy first came to him from three bee-maidens.

Its site is located near modern Tseloneri.
