= Theias =

Character from ancient Greek mythology

In Greek mythology, Theias (Ancient Greek: Θείας) was the King of Mount Lebanon and father of Myrrha and Adonis. The birth of Adonis existed in two different versions:

- The most commonly accepted version is that Aphrodite urged Myrrha or Smyrna to commit incest with her father, Theias. Myrrha's nurse helped with the scheme. When Theias discovered this, he flew into a rage, chasing his daughter with a knife. The gods turned her into a myrrh tree and Adonis eventually sprung from this tree.
- It was also said that Myrrha fled from her father and Aphrodite turned her into a tree. Adonis was then born when Theias shot an arrow into the tree or when a boar used its tusks to tear the tree's bark off.
