= Owl of Athena =

Symbol of the Greek goddess Athena

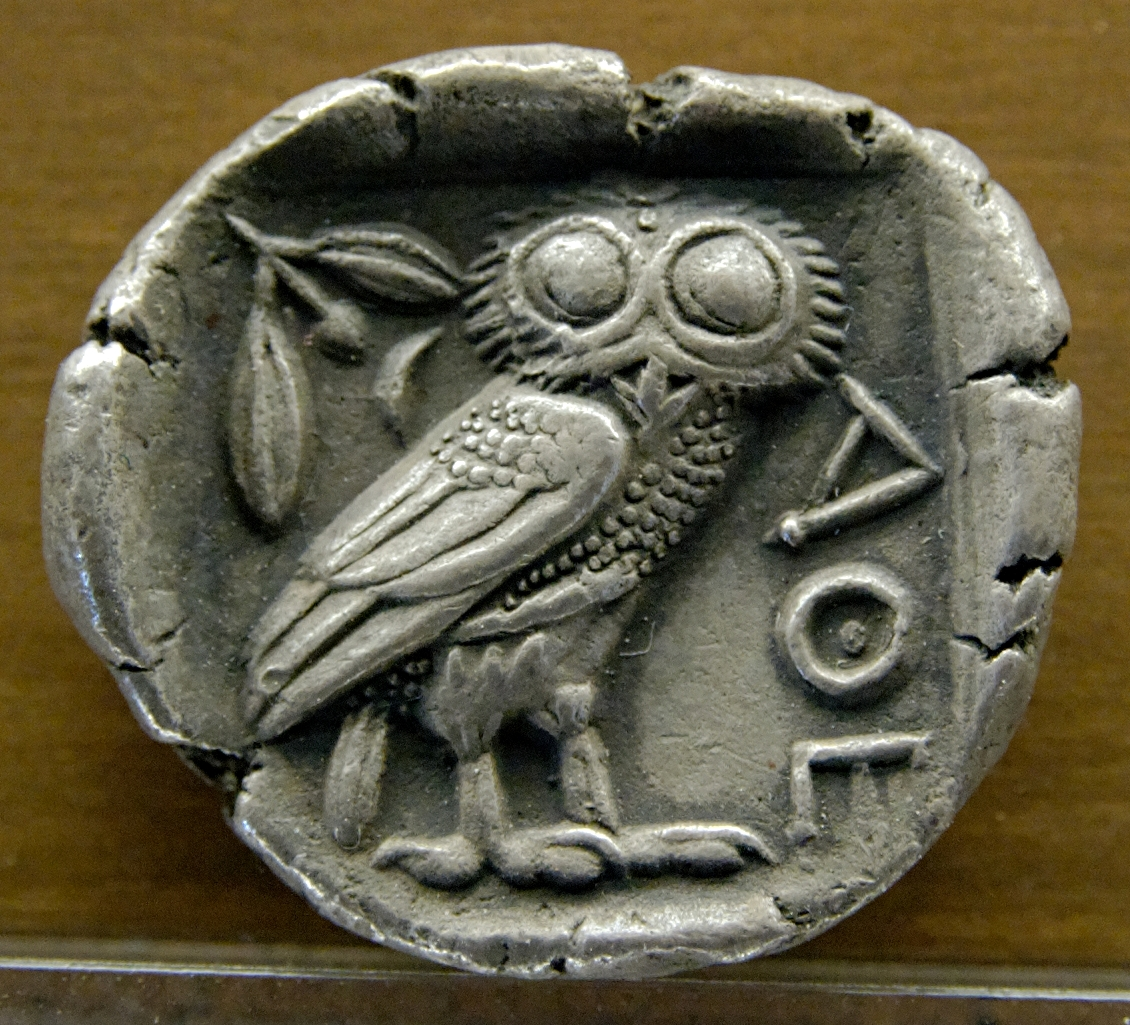
Silver tetradrachm coin at the Museum of Fine Arts of Lyon depicting the owl of Athena (c. 480–420 BC). The inscription "ΑΘΕ" is an abbreviation of ΑΘΗΝΑΙΩΝ, which may be translated as "of the Athenians". In daily use the Athenian drachmas were called glaukes (γλαῦκες, owls). This silver coin was first issued in 479 BC in Athens after the Persians were defeated by the Greeks.

In Greek mythology, a little owl (Athene noctua) traditionally represents or accompanies Athena, the virgin goddess of wisdom, or Minerva, her syncretic incarnation in Roman mythology. Because of such association, the bird—often referred to as the "owl of Athena" or the "owl of Minerva"—has been used as a symbol of knowledge, wisdom, perspicacity and erudition throughout the Western world.

== Classical World ==
=== Ancient Greece ===
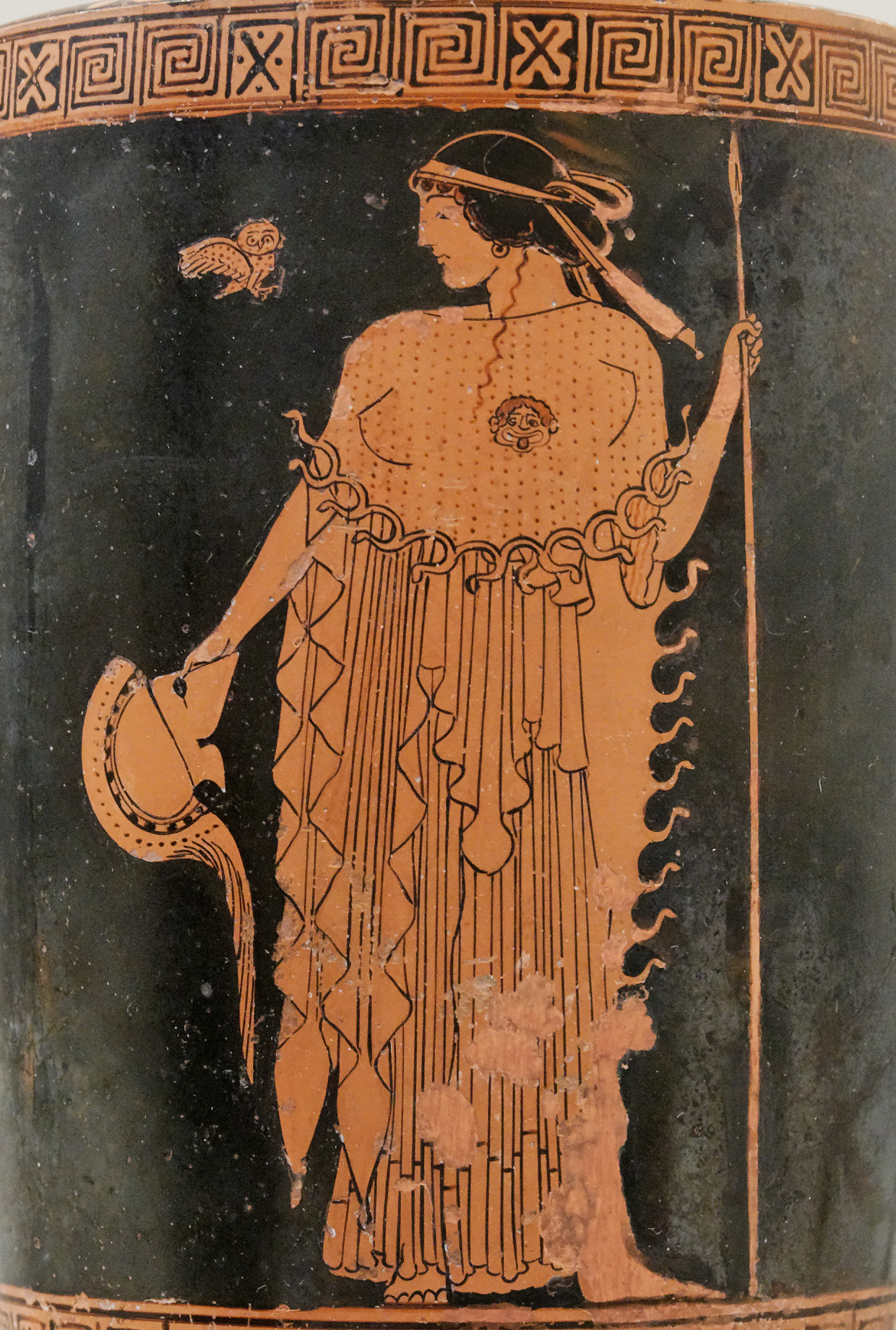
Athena holding a helmet and a spear, with an owl. Attributed to the Brygos Painter (c. 490–480 BC). The Metropolitan Museum of Art.

The reasons for the association of Athena and the owl are uncertain. Some mythographers, such as David Kinsley and Martin P. Nilsson, suggest that she may descend from a Minoan palace goddess associated with birds and Marija Gimbutas claim to trace Athena's origins as an Old European bird and snake goddess.

On the other hand, Cynthia Berger theorizes about the appeal of some characteristics of owls—such as their ability to see in the dark—to be used as symbol of wisdom while others, such as William Geoffrey Arnott, propose a simple association between founding myths of Athens and the significant number of little owls in the region (a fact noted since antiquity by Aristophanes in The Birds and Lysistrata).

In any case, the city of Athens seems to have adopted the owl as proof of allegiance to its patron virgin goddess, who, according to a popular origin myth reproduced on the West pediment of the Parthenon, secured the favor of its citizens by providing them with a more enticing gift than Poseidon.

Owls were commonly reproduced by Athenians on vases, weights and prize amphoras for the Panathenaic Games. The owl of Athena even became the common obverse of the Athenian tetradrachms after 510 BC and according to Philochorus, the Athenian tetradrachm was known as glaux (γλαύξ, little owl) throughout the ancient world and "owl" in present-day numismatics. They were not, however, used exclusively by them to represent Athena and were even used for motivation during battles by other Greek cities, such as in the victory of Agathocles of Syracuse over the Carthaginians in 310 BC—in which owls flying through the ranks were interpreted as Athena's blessing—or in the Battle of Salamis, chronicled in Plutarch's biography of Themistocles.

=== Rome ===
The association between the owl and the goddess continued through Minerva in Roman mythology, although the latter sometimes simply adopts it as a sacred or favorite bird. For example, in Ovid’s Metamorphoses, Corone the crow complains that her spot as the goddess' sacred bird is occupied by the owl, which in that particular story turns out to be Nyctimene, a cursed daughter of Epopeus, king of Lesbos.

As for ancient Roman folklore, owls were considered harbingers of death if they hooted while perched on a roof, and placing one of its feathers near someone sleeping could prompt him or her to speak and reveal their secrets.

== As a philosophical metaphor ==
The philosophical use of the metaphor of the mind as a night owl goes at least as far back as an analogy in Aristotle's Metaphysics between the day-blind eyes of bats and human intellect (Aristo., Met. II 993 b9–11). This more negative epistemological metaphor of a night owl was long transmitted through the philosophical tradition, e.g. Thomas Aquinas (Summa contra gentiles, quaestio 45). In affirmative contrast, the 19th-century German idealist philosopher Georg Wilhelm Friedrich Hegel famously noted that "the owl of Minerva spreads its wings only with the falling of the dusk"; philosophy comes to understand a historical condition just as it passes away. Philosophy appears only in the "maturity of reality", because it understands in hindsight.

Philosophy, as the thought of the world, does not appear until reality has completed its formative process, and made itself ready. History thus corroborates the teaching of the conception that only in the maturity of reality does the ideal appear as counterpart to the real, apprehends the real world in its substance, and shapes it into an intellectual kingdom. When philosophy paints its grey in grey, one form of life has become old, and by means of grey it cannot be rejuvenated, but only known. The owl of Minerva takes its flight only when the shades of night are gathering.

— G.W.F. Hegel, Philosophy of Right (1820), "Preface"; translated by S W Dyde, 1896

Klaus Vieweg describes it as "one of the most beautiful metaphors of the history of philosophy" in his Hegel biography. In a recent reconstruction, Hegel's affirmative metaphor, in opposition to the philosophical tradition, seems to originate between Goethe and a relatively unknown philosophical writer, Jacob Hermann Obereit, around 1795 in Jena, where Hegel stayed shortly after, giving lectures.

== See also ==
- Nyctimene
