= Epopeus =

Set of mythological Greek characters

In Greek mythology, Epopeus (/ɪˈpoʊpiːəs/; Ancient Greek: Ἐπωπεύς, romanized: Epōpeús) was the name of the following figures:

- Epopeus, king of Sicyon.
- Epopeus, king of Lesbos and both father and rapist of Nyctimene.
- Epopeus, one of the sailors who tried to delude Dionysus, but were turned into dolphins.
- Epopeus, a man from Lemnos, killed by the Lemnian women when they murdered all the men in the island. Epopeus was killed by his own mother.
