= Leutogi =

Polynesian goddess

- Bats; Fertility; Night

Leutogi was a Polynesian goddess, originally a Samoan princess later turned goddess, and once worshiped in the Samoan archipelago in the central South Pacific ocean.

== Myth ==
The Tuitoga Manaia had two wives: one Tongan and the other Samoan. The Samoan wife, Leutogitupa'itea, was the daughter of Mulianalafai. Before leaving Samoa, her brother, Taoulupo'o, advised her to send a sign if she ever needed his help.

In time, the Tongan wife gave birth to a child, while Leutogi remained childless. Jealous and tormented by the Tongan woman's taunts, Leutogi decided to kill the child. One day, while at their common bathing place, Leutogi took a tuaniu (a thin spine from a coconut leaf) and fatally pierced the child's skull. The Tongan woman, hearing her child's cries, returned to find her child dead. Leutogi was suspected, and the Tuitoga, enraged by the murder, ordered her to be burned alive.

Recalling her brother's advice, Leutogi stirred the ocean, sending waves to Samoa as a signal for help. Taoulupo'o saw the sign and sent his pet white pe'a (bat), supported by the spirits of the dead, to aid her. The white bat, along with the bats of Tonga, saved Leutogi by extinguishing the flames with their water, preventing her execution.

Surprised by her survival, the Tuitoga exiled Leutogi to a barren, haunted island. The aitu (spirit) named Losi, who inhabited the island, expected her to perish from hunger and thirst. However, bats brought her food daily, keeping her alive.

Eventually, the Fijian Tuiaea sailed by the island, and upon Leutogi's request, he took her with him. They married, and she gave birth to a son, Fa'asega. When Fa'asega grew up, Leutogi sent him to Savai'i with three titles for her family: Tonumaipe'a, in honor of the bats that saved her; Tilomai, commemorating the aitu Losi's watchful gaze; and Tau'ili'ili, referencing her use of stones to cover her oven in place of leaves. The name "Tonumaipe'a" translates to "the decision from the bat," symbolizing the pivotal role the bats played in her survival.

== See also ==
- The Samoa flying fox in mythology
- The Minyades – three sisters in Greek mythology who were turned into bats and owls.
- Camazotz – Mayan bat god
- Pitao Ziña - Zapotec god of Death and night, represented as a bat.
- Tzinacan - Aztec bat god
- Evaki/Ewaki - Brazilian goddess of night, sleep, dreams, and day, worshipped by the Bakairi people of Brazil and sometimes represented as a bat.
- Nyctimene (mythology)
- Zhong Kui the Demon Queller with Five Bats
