= Tetradrachm =

Ancient Greek silver coin

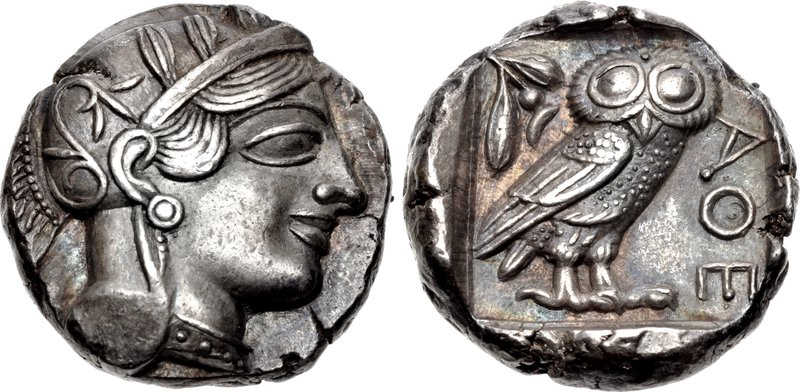
Athenian tetradrachm in the style minted from 454 BC to 413 BC, showing the head of Athena and her sacred owl. These tetradrachms, mass produced and nicknamed little owls became the dominant trade coins in the Mediterranean and well beyond in 5th century BC, with hoards being found as far away as modern-day Afghanistan.

The tetradrachm /ˈtetrəˌdræm/ (Ancient Greek: τετράδραχμον, romanized: tetrádrachmon, literally "four-drachm piece") was a large silver coin that originated in Ancient Greece. It was nominally equivalent to four drachmae. Over time the tetradrachm effectively became the standard trade coin of Classical Antiquity, spreading well beyond the borders of the Hellenic world. It was minted in many weight and fineness standards, but the Attic standard of about 17.2 grams gradually became dominant.

First appearing in late 6th century BC, the tetradrachm had one of the longest working lives of any currency in history. Popularity of the tetradrachm outlived the political independence of the Greeks and it remained in wide circulation in the Mediterranean up until the currency reform of Diocletian in AD 296/7. Meanwhile debased varieties persisted in India and Central Asia deep into the early Middle Ages. Counting the Chorasmian coinage, which continued to be minted until the end of the eighth century well into the Islamic era, the continuous tradition spans more about 1300 years from the first Greek specimens.

Tetradrachms were minted in vast quantities by various polities and were often used for state expenses such as military pay. Their large size also made them convenient for state actors and political figures to advertise themselves or to deliver political messages.

Tetradrachms continue to be collected in modern times, and rare or well-preserved pieces can reach considerable prices.

== Name and origin ==
The word tetrádrachmon is a straightforward compound of tetra- ("four") and drachmē, the basic Greek monetary unit whose own name is derived from the verb δράσσομαι (drássomai, "(I) grasp"). This points to the origin of the drachm itself as "a handful" of iron spits (oboloi).

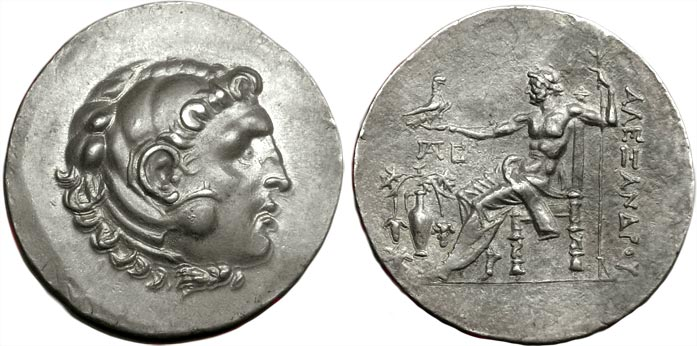
Tetradrachm struck at the Temnos mint c. 188–170 BC, in the style and in the name of Alexander the Great, showing young Heracles and a seated Zeus. Alexander's coinage maintained the Attic standard of Athens while displacing its imagery, and by the earliest second century BC the Athenian owl had lost its dominant position in international trade. Many smaller states continued to strike in Alexander's name long after his death.

Large-denomination silver coinage appeared in several parts of the Greek world at approximately the same time, in each case where a mint had access to abundant bullion. Akanthos and other Thraco-Macedonian cities and tribes, drawing on the mines of the northern Aegean, began striking heavy silver towards the end of the sixth century BC. Akanthos tetradrachms are conventionally dated from c. 525 BC. In Athens tetradrachm appeared by c. 515 BC. Priority among these is not securely established. Archaic chronologies rest largely on hoard evidence and stylistic sequence and carry margins of two or three decades, wide enough to encompass the differences involved.

The denomination was initially not universal. Aegina, the earliest important silver-striking Greek state, built its system on a heavy stater of about 12.2 g and did not adopt the tetradrachm as a working denomination. Corinth divided its 8.6 g stater into three drachms rather than two, leaving no place for a four-drachm unit. These local coinages however declined by the times of Alexander the Great.

== Purchasing power ==
Tetradrachm's purchasing power varied widely by period and region, and the surviving written evidence inevitably clusters heavily on Classical Athens. In the mid-5th century BC a skilled craftsman working on the Erechtheion was paid about one drachm per day, so a single tetradrachm represented roughly four days of skilled labour. Thucydides records pay of one drachm per man per day for a trireme crew at the end of 5th century BC, so a ship of 200 men cost approximately one talent or 1,500 tetradrachms for a full month at sea.

Grain prices give a rough measure of what a tetradrachm bought. A soldier on campaign in the fifth century received a daily ration of one choinix of wheat, and wheat sold in Athens at the end of that century for three drachmai per medimnos of 48 choinices. A tetradrachm therefore bought enough grain to feed one person for roughly two months, or a household of four for about two weeks. This was far from only expense for food. Grain was considered sitos, the staple that provided most calories. A meal however also required opson, that is the relish eaten with it, ranging from salt, fruit, olives and onions to cheese and fish.

The tetradrachm was generally too valuable to be used in small daily transactions. The number of coin hoards may indicate that they were probably used by individuals to store wealth. The main use for the tetradrachm however were state expenditure, including military spending and soldiers' pay, tributes and public works. It was also used for and large scale trade as trade coins, recognizable medium of payment between merchants. In particular the Athenian owl dominated the international trade before it was gradually overshadowed and replaced by tetradrachms of Alexander the Great.

== In Athens ==
Athenian tetradrachm in the archaic style minted from c. 500 BC to c. 480 BC

During the tyranny of Peisistratos Athens began the systematic exploitation of the silver mines of Laurion in southern Attica. This windfall allowed Athens to introduce c. 515 BC the tetradrachm minted at the 17.2 g weight standard, which became later known in numismatics as the Attic standard. Within a decade the design had settled into the form it would keep for more than two centuries: the helmeted head of Athena on the obverse, and on the reverse an owl with an olive sprig and the abbreviated ethnic ΑΘΕ. Athenians called the coins γλαῦκες (glaukes), little owls. Modern numismatists writing in English often call the coins simply owls.

The basic design of the owl was almost unchanged for about two centuries, save for minor stylistic shifts that allow modern numismatists to assign specific coins to time windows sometimes as broad as half a century. This is in contrast to the frequent restyling practiced elsewhere and is likely linked to the recognition that the owl quickly gained internationally. Hoard finds attest to the owl's adoption in places such as Egypt, the Levant and the eastern reaches of the Persian Empire, making it the most widely circulated coinage of the Ancient world.

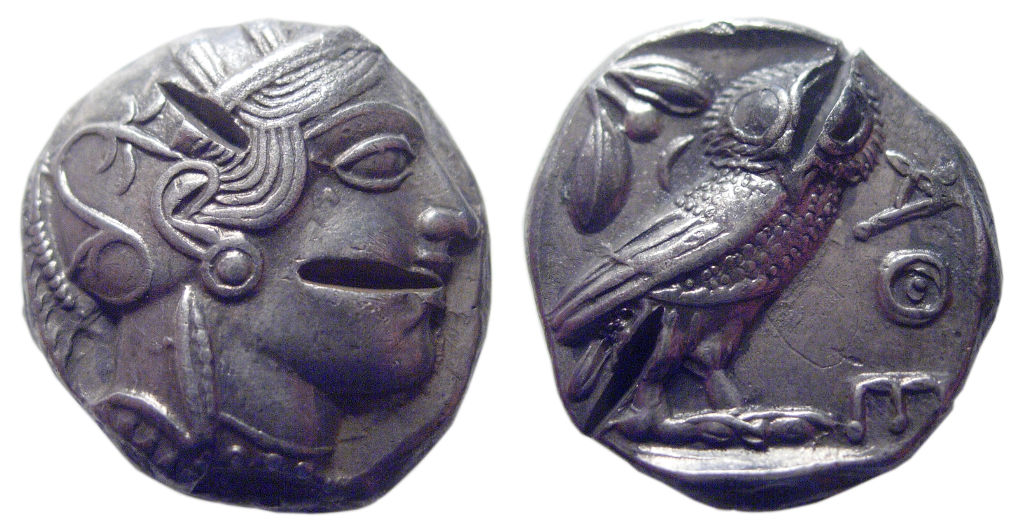
An owl from c. 449 – c. 413 BC with multiple "test cuts"

That success caused the owl to be imitated by other authorities and forged on a large scale. Imitations were often of good quality and simply took advantage of the owl's established acceptance, while forgeries were meant to defraud, using substandard silver or fourrées, that is silver-coated base metal cores. Both merchants and governments were well aware of such practices. Many owls bear test cuts made to check whether the coin was solid silver. Nikophon's law of 375/4 BC placed dokimastes, a public slave in the Agora and Piraeus to test coins and rule on which imitations could circulate. Counterfeit coin was confiscated, but good imitations were handed back to the person who presented them.

The very large output was occasionally disrupted during political upheavals. Production contracted sharply late in the Peloponnesian War, after the Spartan occupation of Decelea in 413 BC cut access to the mines in Laurion. Athens issued gold in 407/6 BC and plated bronze in 406/5 BC, the latter withdrawn and exchanged for silver once the war ended and demonetised about a decade afterwards. Athenian silver was also subject to a recall on at least one occasion. Modern numismatists have reconstructed a programme of 353 BC by which all larger-denomination silver in Athens was demonetised and called in for restriking. This recall had a confiscatory character, as those surrendering coin received back less than they submitted, and it served as a means of raising revenue during the fiscal crisis following the Social War.

New Style tetradrachm of Athens.

Production of the owl wound down towards the end of the third century BC, coinciding with political subjugation of Athens to the power of Macedon and the rise of the Alexander-style coinage. Around 185 BC, in the aftermath of the Macedonian Wars, Athens reintroduced its native coinage. This included in particular the "New Style" or stephanephoric tetradrachm, struck on a broad, thin flan, slightly lighter at about 16.7 g, with a design more in line with current trends of the Hellenistic art. The obverse carried a redesigned head of Athena, and the reverse an owl standing on a fallen amphora within an olive wreath. The series ran until about 42 BC, when the Second Triumvirate went away with the last vestiges of Greek autonomy.

== Alexander and the Hellenistic kingdoms ==
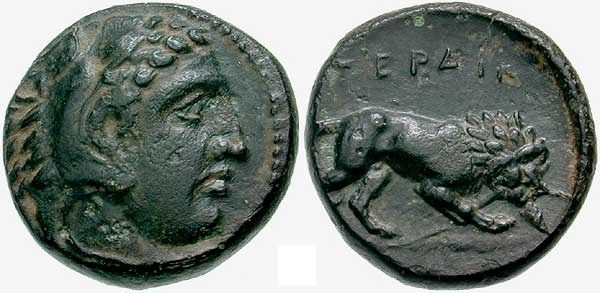
Bronze of one of Alexander's predecessors Perdiccas III (365–359 BC), with the head of Heracles in a lion skin

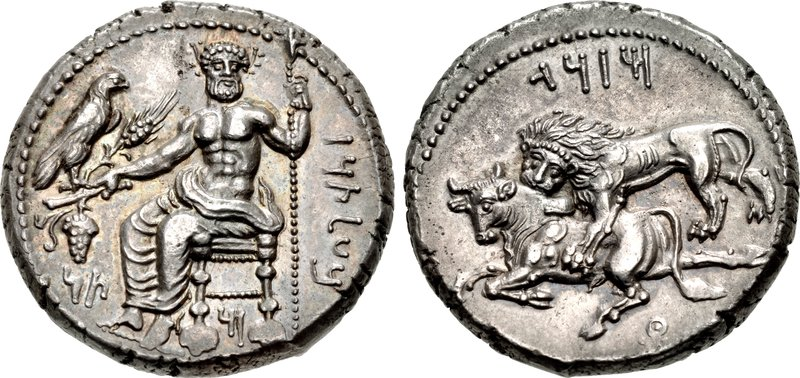
Stater of Mazaeus at Tarsos (361–334 BC), with Baaltars enthroned holding an eagle and sceptre

The two traditions behind Alexander's tetradrachm. The Heracles obverse drew on established Macedonian imagery, while the enthroned Zeus of the reverse has been argued to derive from the Baaltars of the Cilician satrapal coinage.

The conquests of Alexander the Great also marked a profound shift in ancient financial markets. The vast treasures captured from the Achaemenid Empire allowed the minting of enough tetradrachms to pay the massive Macedonian army. Alexander introduced his own distinctive tetradrachm, minted on a broader and thinner flan. The obverse depicted the head of the young Heracles in a lion skin, from whom the Argead dynasty claimed descent, an already traditional motif of Macedonian coinage. The reverse was an innovation: Zeus enthroned with eagle and sceptre, in a composition that has been argued to derive from the satrapal staters of Mazaeus, who struck the enthroned local god Baaltars at Tarsos in Cilicia and later governed Babylonia for Alexander. The coinage thus combined Macedonian dynastic imagery with a Near Eastern model, matching the tastes of the mixed population of the empire it was struck for. Minted in high-grade silver at mints throughout that empire and retaining the Attic standard of about 17.2 g, these coins displaced the Athenian owl.

Alexander placed a strong emphasis on uniformity and gradually phased out other large silver denominations across his realm, further reinforcing the status of the tetradrachm as the standard large coin. Production continued long after Alexander's death in 323 BC. His successors initially continued to use his types before substituting their own, and independent cities struck "posthumous Alexanders" for roughly two centuries, some into the first century BC. In fact the great majority of catalogued Alexander types are in fact posthumous. The result was an international currency with no single issuing authority behind it. Cities and states did not always accept coin struck elsewhere until they had assessed it themselves, marking their approval with a countermark.

== Gallery ==
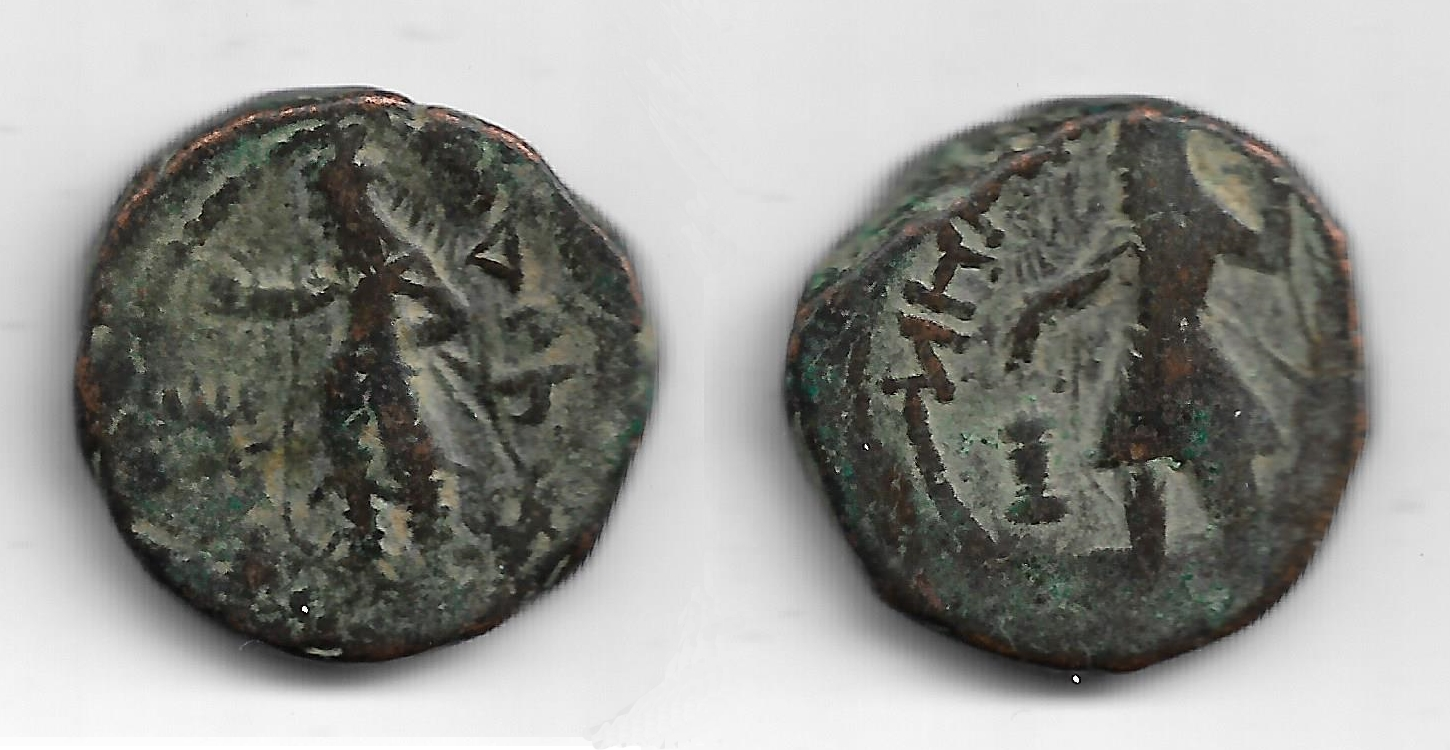
Tetradrachm from Bactria under the Kushan Empire c. 100–300 AD.

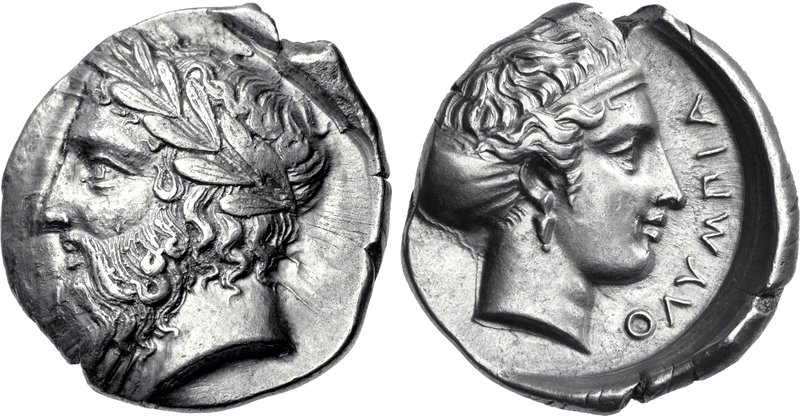
Tetradrachm of Olympia

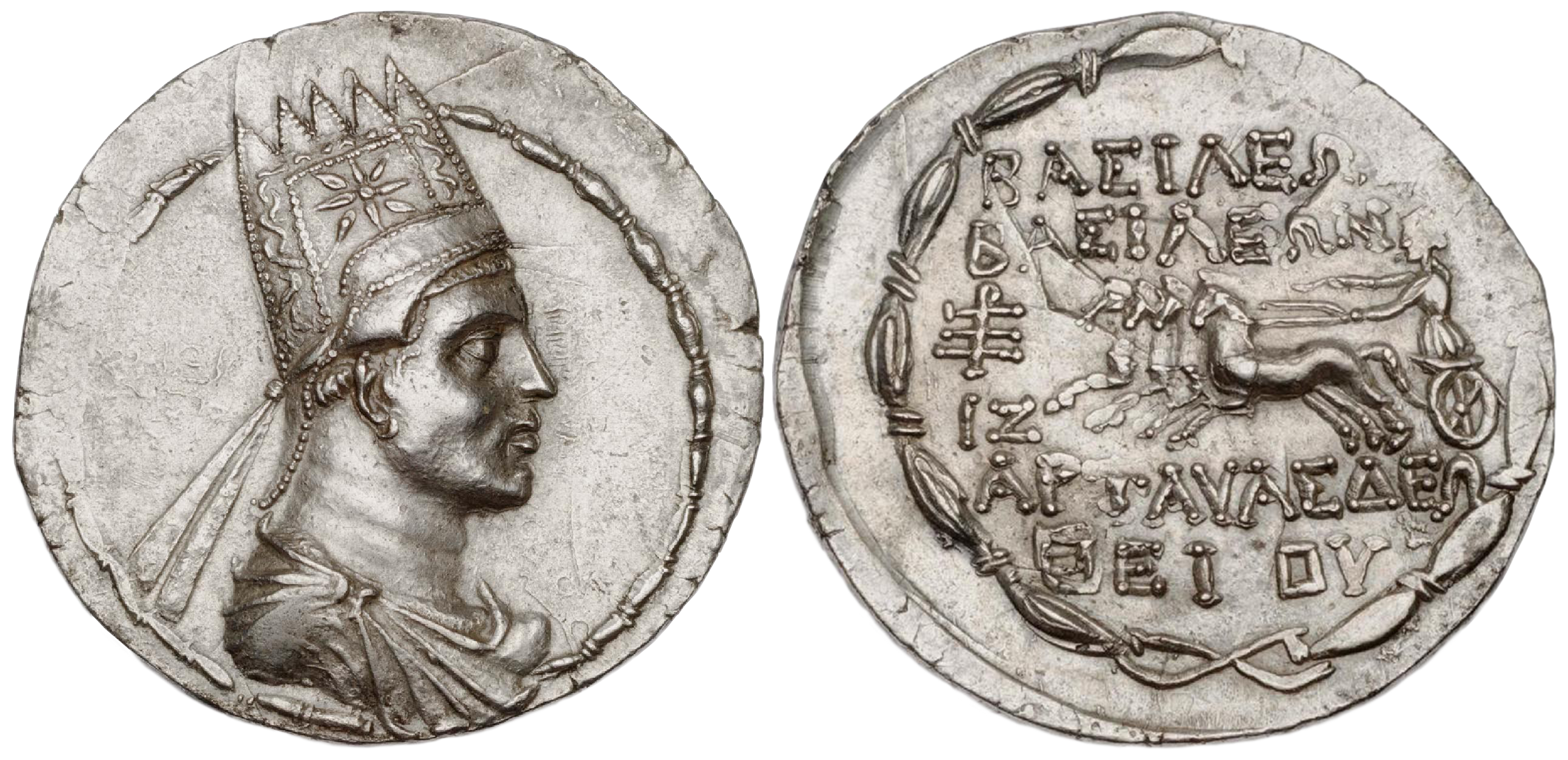
Tetradrachm of Artavazd II of Armenia

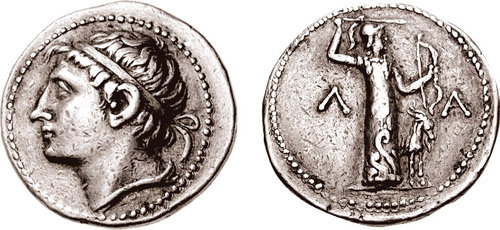
Tetradrachm of Sparta

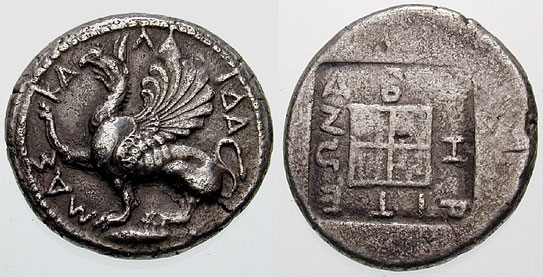
Tetradrachm of Abdera

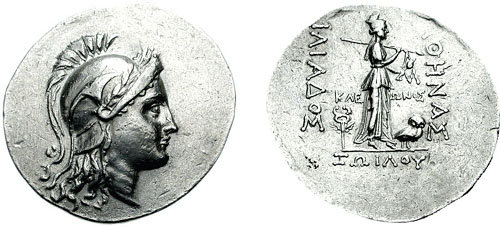
Tetradrachm of Troy

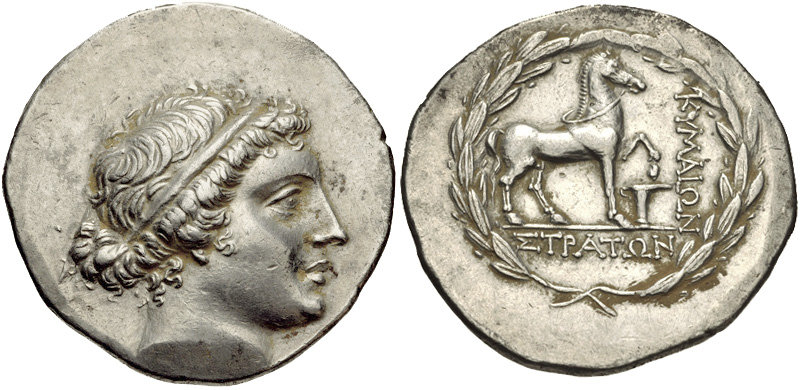
Tetradrachm of Kyme

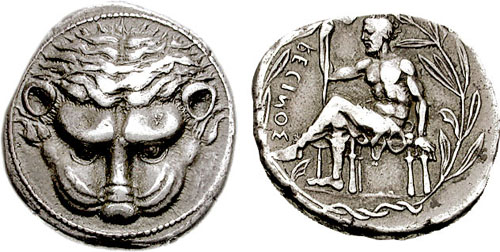
Tetradrachm of Rhegion

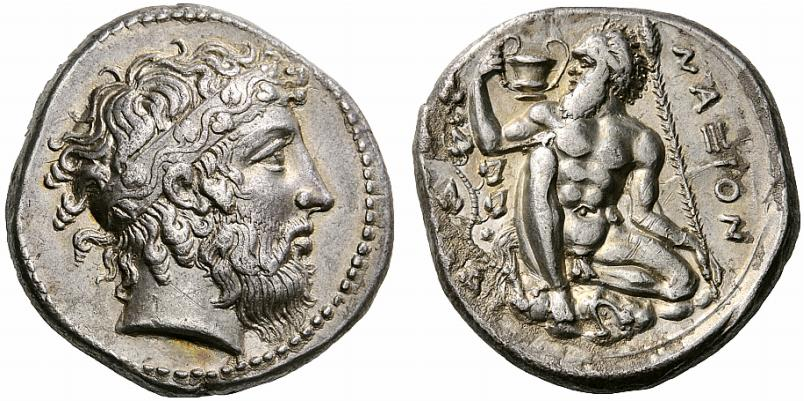
Tetradrachm of Naxos

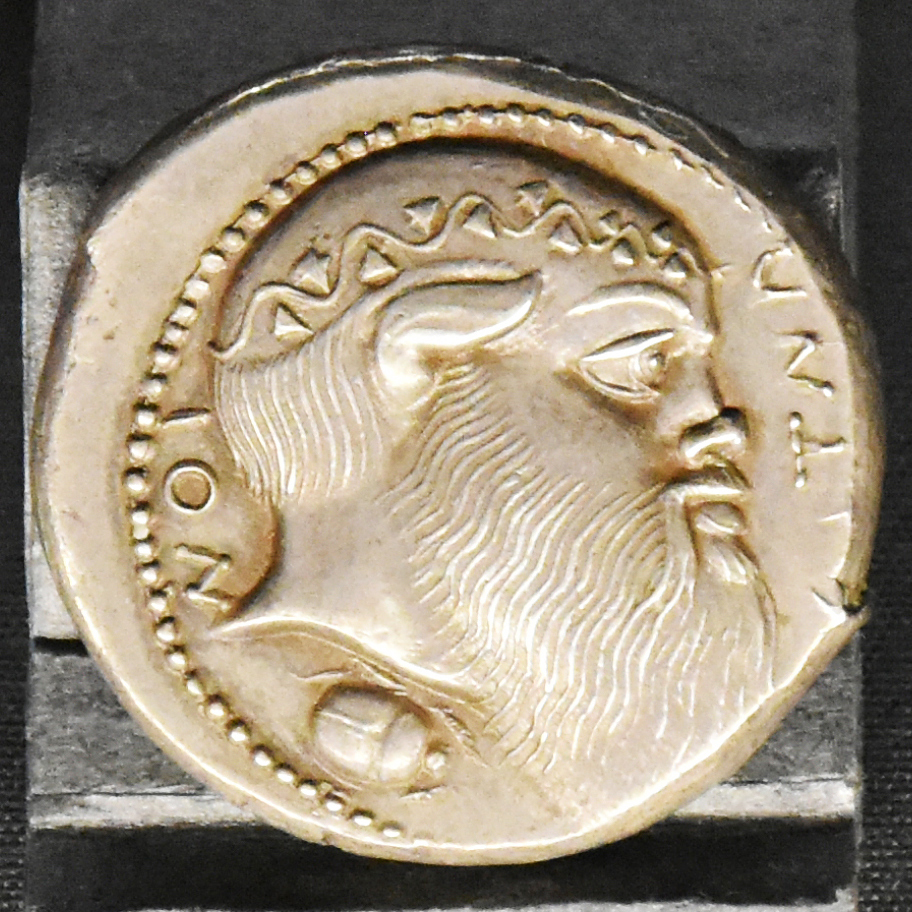
Tetradrachm of Aetna, 5th C. BC

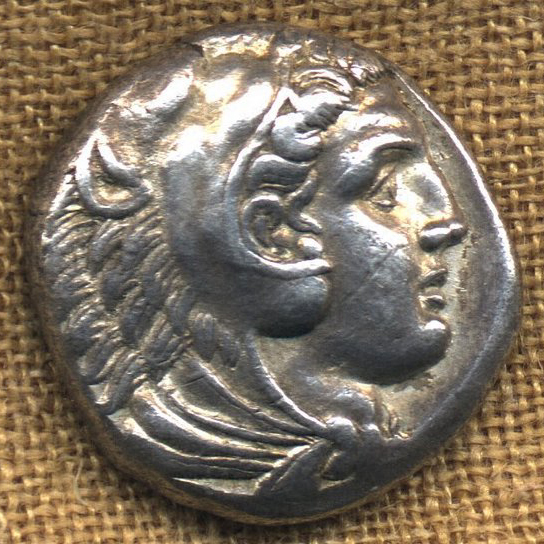
Tetradrachm of Alexander the Great

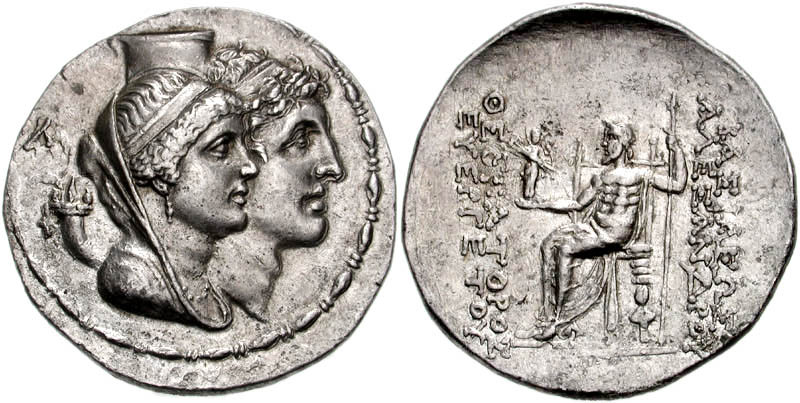
Tetradrachm of Cleopatra Thea

== See also ==
- Coin
- Coin in the fish's mouth
- List of historical currencies
- Stater
- Gesellschaft für Internationale Geldgeschichte
