= List of Victor and Valentino episodes =

The following is a list of episodes from the series Victor and Valentino.

== Series overview ==
Season	Episodes	Originally released	
Season	Episodes	First released	Last released
Pilot		October 29, 2016	
1	39	March 30, 2019	October 26, 2019
2	39	April 18, 2020	May 29, 2021
3	41	September 4, 2021	August 26, 2022

== Episodes ==
=== Pilot (2016) ===
Title	Directed by	Written and storyboarded by	Original release date	Prod. code	U.S. viewers (millions)
"Victor and Valentino"	Nick Cross (art), and Robert Alvarez with Randy Myers (animation)	Diego Molano	October 29, 2016	503-005	N/A
During the summer, Victor and Valentino escape their boredom by following a strange dog into the underworld. While there, they have to solve a complicated maze, but the half–brothers cannot seem to work together. This is made even more complicated when they end up facing the Bone Boys Mic and Hun.

=== Season 1 (2019) ===
No. overall	No. in season	Title	Written and storyboarded by	Story by	Original release date	Prod. code	U.S. viewers (millions)
1	1	"Folk Art Foes"	Diego Molano, Corey Barnes, Leticia Silva & Ryan Kramer	Diego Molano & Haley Mancini	March 30, 2019 (Note: This episode was first released online on March 4, 2019.)	001	0.66
Vic and Val stumble across a room in the basement full of alebrijes, small colorful folk dolls. Despite a warning from Grandma Chata, the boys accidentally release a trickster coyote spirit named HueHue who wants to do nothing but pull pranks. While Val wants to stop him from causing mischief, Vic finds him way too fun, until he pulls a prank on Val and starts more dangerous pranks.
2	2	"Dead Ringer"	Mark Galez & Jon Feria	Isaac Gonzalez & Diego Molano	March 30, 2019 (Note: This episode was first released online on March 15, 2019.)	002	0.66
Vic picks another player over Val during a soccer match. In retaliation, Val gets Guillermo, Rosa, Cacao, and Charlene, one of his rivals, to join his team. When his team does not match up well against Vic's, Val takes Charlene's suggestion of getting Juan, a soccer player from the afterlife, to possess him, only for things to get out of hand.
3	3	"Brotherly Love"	Carmen Liang & Kayla Carlisle	Isaac Gonzalez	March 30, 2019	005	0.65
While talking about going to Lucha Fest, Vic and Val get into another one of their brotherly spats and break Grandma Chata's plant. They go to Don Jalapeño's store and get help from his daughter Xochi in getting a new plant. Unfortunately, the new plant turns out to be a monster that grows whenever the brothers continue to bicker and it soon runs amok all over Monte Macabre.
4	4	"Chata's Quinta Quinceañera"	Chris Allison	Isaac Gonzalez	March 30, 2019	003	0.65
As Vic and Val prepare for Grandma Chata's Quinta Quinceañera, they remember that teenager Andres has a pool party at the same time. Sal, a friend of the brothers, arrives with a magic flute that can transport anyone anywhere. The brothers use it to travel between parties, but end up transporting other things with them as well.
5	5	"Legend of the Hidden Skatepark"	Miggs Perez & Chris Allison	Isaac Gonzalez & Diego Molano	April 6, 2019 (Note: This episode was first released online on March 29, 2019.)	006	0.45
Annoyed at all the rules, Vic and Val search for a hidden skate park. The park is run by kids who make up their own rules and are led by Javier, a boy who asks for sacrifices. A girl named Itzel arouses Val's unfairness about the society, forcing the brothers to flee when Javier catches on to their heightened suspicions.
6	6	"Cleaning Day"	Mark Galez & Jon Feria	Tom Welch & Diego Molano	April 6, 2019	007	0.45
It is cleaning day and Grandma Chata is disgusted with how dirty Vic and Val's room is, so much so that the house itself sends the brothers into a video game-style dungeon where they must clean up everything. Getting out, however, will be difficult as Vic loves being dirty and Val cannot stop collecting things.
7	7	"The Babysitter"	Kayla Carlisle & Carmen Liang	Diego Molano & Julie Whitesell	April 13, 2019	008	0.60
Vic and Val want to go see a fireworks show, but Don Jalapeño invites Grandma Chata on a date, resulting in Xochi having to babysit the two. Xochi makes every attempt to keep the brothers from leaving, but when they finally escape, they learn that Xochi has snuck out for dance lessons. The trio must then make it home before the adults do.
8	8	"Hurricane Chata"	Zeus Cervas & Katherine Frasier	Isaac Gonzalez & Dana Starfield	April 13, 2019	009	0.60
During the summer solstice, Vic and Val are forced to wear Grandma Chata's old bathing suits at the nearby lake. They learn that Grandma Chata's emotions affect the wave-making and decide to raise money to buy new bathing suits. However, when the waves stop, the brothers start bothering Chata, leading to a storm.
9	9	"The Lonely Haunts Club"	Kayla Carlisle & Carmen Liang	Julie Whitesell & Diego Molano	April 20, 2019	011	0.62
While Grandma Chata watches a movie on Dia de Amantes, Vic and Val get invited by their "rivals" Charlene and Pineapple to explore a haunted house owned by El Pintor, a ghost painter. The trip is actually for Charlene to get a kiss from Vic, but the gang is surprised to learn that El Pintor is real.
10	10	"Suerte"	Zeus Cervas & Katherine Frasier	Isaac Gonzalez & Diego Molano	April 20, 2019	010	0.62
Grandma Chata buys a board game called Suerte from Maria Teresa and plays it with Vic and Val. When Vic cheats, the characters from the game come to life and start transporting all the people of Monte Macabre into the game. Now, Vic must tell the truth in order to save everyone, but he is too proud to admit it.
11	11	"The Dark Room"	Mark Galez & Jon Feria	Isaac Gonalez	April 27, 2019	012	0.43
Val tries to join the photography club, but gets laughed out by its leader, Baker. Val gets inspiration from his friend Isabella to take the best picture he can. At Vic's indirect suggestion, the two decide to go looking for the legendary Chupacabra. When they find it, it turns out to be an animal-loving vegetarian.
12	12	"The Collector"	Miggz Perez & Chris Allison	Isaac Gonzalez	May 4, 2019 (Note: This episode was first released online on April 26, 2019.)	014	0.48
Vic takes one of Val's coins from his coin collection to use at a game of foosball. Angry that his brother took something from him, Val finds Chip's Rarities, a store that houses priceless collections. The owner, Chip, replaces the coin, but in return, he takes Vic to be a part of his creepy puppet collection.
13	13	"The Boy Who Cried Lechuza"	Miggz Perez & Chris Allison	Isaac Gonzalez, Tom Welch & Diego Molano	May 11, 2019	013	0.43
Vic fakes being injured so he can avoid work, but Val exposes this. As a result, neither Val nor Chata respond to his cries when he injures himself for real. Vic is suddenly carried away by the Lechuza, a half-woman, half-owl creature who carries children away to pamper them. Vic suddenly realizes that being pampered for life is not a good way of living.
14	14	"Boss For a Day"	Zeus Cervas & Katherine Frasier	Isaac Gonzalez	May 18, 2019	018	0.45
Chata lets Vic run the taco stand when he complains about Val bossing him around. Vic turns out to be even bossier and "fires" Val from the taco stand. He attempts to run it by himself with Miguelito, but his actions end up turning the whole town against him and result in the taco stand getting dragged by a horse.
15	15	"Cuddle Monster"	Kayla Carlisle & Carmen Liang	Julie Whitesell & Diego Molano	May 25, 2019 (Note: This episode was first released online on May 17, 2019.)	016	0.53
After Chata tells them they can't have a pet, Vic and Val stumble upon a strange reptilian creature they name Cuddles. Don Jalapeño tells them that it is a descendant of Cipactli and to only feed it natural foods, but when Vic accidentally gives it soda, Cuddles grows and cannot satiate its appetite when it starts going after Chata's pet, Huitzi.
16	16	"Los Cadejos"	Kayla Carlisle & Carmen Liang	Julie Whitesell	June 1, 2019	015	0.48
After Vic reveals Val's secret to everyone, he begins to hold a grudge against him. When Chata sends the two into the mountains to collect peppers for her, they encounter a black wolf that begins following them. A woman named Guadalupe tells them that it is an evil, black Cadejo that feeds off of the anger from grudges, and leads people to their doom.
17	17	"It Grows"	Miggs Perez & Chris Allison	Julie Whitesell	June 8, 2019	020	0.39
Val begins showing signs of facial hair, earning the admiration of all the adults, but the ire of Vic who wants to have facial hair of his own. He steals Maria Teresa's hair growth formula and grows a thicker mustache. However, the mustache gains a mind of its own and begins causing havoc all across Monte Macarbe.
18	18	"Welcome to the Underworld"	Mark Galez & Jon Feria	Isaac Gonzalez	June 22, 2019	017	0.38
19	19	"Welcome to the Underworld"	Mark Galez & Jon Feria	Isaac Gonzalez	June 22, 2019	019	0.38
Vic is tired of being called small and weak and is further humiliated during a wrestling match when he is dubbed "Camarón" (Spanish for "Shrimp"). He and Val end up journeying with Achi into the underworld so that Vic can meet his famous wrestling uncle El Toro. While down there, they meet the guardians, the Bone Boys Mic and Hun, who want to trap Vic and Val in the underworld forever. While Val wants to get home, Vic insists on seeing his uncle, but now must rescue himself and his brother by facing the Bone Boys in an actual wrestling match.
20	20	"A New Don"	Kayla Carlisle & Carmen Liang	Julie Whitesell & Diego Molano	June 29, 2019 (Note: This episode was first released online on June 14, 2019.)	021	0.40
While trying to prank Don Jalapeño, Vic and Val learn of the Tzitzimime, a being from the stars that makes people do weird things. They continue their attempt to prank him, but out of nowhere, he begins displaying unusual behavior (such as enjoying their pranks) that disturbs the boys, resulting in them having to research his codex.
21	21	"Churro Kings"	Leticia Silva & Daniel Villa De Rey	Spencer Rothbell	July 6, 2019	022	0.28
Vic and Val are disappointed with the earnings they receive. At the advice of Chata, they decide to sell churros to earn money. When the other residents start stealing their idea and customers, the boys decide to clean out the competition. That is, until Lupe catches onto them and gathers the other sellers to get revenge on them.
22	22	"Know It All"	Zach Bellissimo & Miggs Perez	Isaac Gonzalez & Diego Molano	July 13, 2019	023	0.30
During a spelunking outing, Vic accidentally opens a prison releasing numerous Camazotz, giant demonic chiropteran creatures. He and Val go to see Don Jalapeño for help in defeating the creatures. However, Vic keeps trying to present himself as a know-it-all and ends up ignoring Don and getting the group in bigger trouble.
23	23	"Fistfull of Balloons"	Mark Galez & Jon Feria	Issac Gonzalez	July 20, 2019	024	0.35
While in the middle of a water balloon fight, Vic is double-crossed by one of his own teammates. Angry and upset, he sets out on a mission to find and take out the betrayer no matter what. He continues to search, coming upon a series of false leads. When he finds out the betrayer was Val, it turns into an all-out war of water balloons.
24	24	"Love at First Bite"	Kayla Carlisle & Carmen Liang	Julie Whitesell	July 27, 2019 (Note: This episode was first released online on July 12, 2019.)	025	0.40
Val meets a new girl named Matty who looks like a female version of him and claims to have similar interests. Val immediately swoons for her and the two go out. However, Vic becomes suspicious of her and tails the two. Eventually, it is revealed that Matty and her family are Matlazihua and plan to eat Val, so Vic arrives to save the day.
25	25	"Go With The Flow"	Leticia Silva & Daniel Villa De Rey	Isaac Gonzalez	August 3, 2019	026	0.29
Chata invites Sal to stay with her and the boys after his house gets blown away. While Vic and Val like Sal, he turns out to be a messy house guest that quickly annoys them. They try to get rid of him, but he only wants to stay longer. Eventually, he leaves his headband and the boys play with it, only to learn that it allows the wearer to fly.
26	26	"Aluxes"	Miggs Perez & Zach Bellissimo	Isaac Gonzalez	August 10, 2019	027	0.36
As Val LARPs with the other kids, Vic becomes insulted when he is told that he does not have the makings of a king. He finds an ancient crown at home that brings the statues in the living room to life. At first Vic begins having fun overtaking Val and the other kids, but when the crown breaks the statues become malevolent and dangerous.
27	27	"Guillermo's Gathering"	Zach Bellissimo, Miggs Perez & Gina Gress	Spencer Rothbell	August 17, 2019	030	0.41
Vic and Val are forced by Chata to attend Guillermo's birthday party. They are immediately put off by his eccentric and gothic tastes as well as the underwhelming festivities. In an attempt to find party favors to prove they attended, they accidentally jump-start Guillermo's best creation, a super fast and fun train set.
28	28	"Balloon Boys"	Leticia Silva & Daniel Villa De Rey	Isaac Gonzalez	August 24, 2019	028	0.47
As Vic and Val argue over being favored, Sal arrives in his hot air balloon and invites the brothers to join him in painting over the Nazca Lines. When Sal informs them of their reality altering abilities, the boys begin drawing their own Nazca Lines in order to one up one another into becoming Sal's "favorite" and co-captain.
29	29	"The Great Bongo Heist"	April Amézquita & Jason Dwyer	Julie Whitesell	October 5, 2019 (Note: This episode was first released online on September 27, 2019.)	032	0.49
Xochi allows Vic and Val to borrow her bongos for fun. However, it just so happens to be Abuela Day and the boys have nothing to give her. In a last-minute effort, they gift her the bongos and immediately regret it. Unable to open up, they resolve to dress as burglars and steal them back, but discover the house has a supernatural burglar alarm.
30	30	"Escape from Bebe Bay"	April Amézquita & Mike Diederich	Julie Whitesell	October 5, 2019	031	0.49
While the adults are having a spa day, Vic and Val hide from a water war and decide to use some of Maria Teresa's cream for camouflage. However, the cream turns out to be anti-aging cream and turns the boys, as well as Don Jalapeño, into babies. They end up at a daycare center where they can understand Cacao, who runs the place like a prison.
31	31	"Band for Life"	Kayla Carlisle & Carmen Liang	Julie Whitesell	October 5, 2019	034	0.45
Xochi is heading out to a concert for Paranormal Shadows. At Chata's suggestion, she reluctantly takes the ecstatic Vic and Val along with her. The boys cause a ruckus at the concert that embarrasses Xochi to no end. Desperate to leave an impression on her and her crew, they decide to get onstage and show off how cool they can be.
32	32	"Tez Sez"	Miggs Perez & Zach Bellissimo	Diego Molano & Spencer Rothbell	October 5, 2019	035	0.45
Maria Teresa introduces Vic and Val to her husband Tez, a fancy magician. They are invited to a party, but Chata bars them from going. The boys sneak out and discover that Tez is an all-powerful and unscrupulous man who has big plans for Monte Macabre. When he traps Vic in one of his mirrors, Val has to rescue him and defeat this supernatural foe.
33	33	"Forever Ever"	April Amézquita & Gina Gress	Spencer Rothbell	October 12, 2019	036	0.42
Victor and Valentino decide to watch movies at the theater, but are unable to do so due to a lack of money. As a result, they decide to clean up Maria Teresa's attic. While up there, they accidentally activate a creepy timer statue that traps them in a time loop. While Vic tries using it to his advantage, Val tries to solve the mystery of their predicament, ultimately realizing that the statue is to blame.
34	34	"Dance Reynaldo Dance"	Miggs Perez & Zach Bellissimo	Julie Whitesell	October 12, 2019	039	0.42
Vic is desperate to win the cash prize for the dance contest in Monte Macabre and is frustrated that his partner Val won't let him call all the shots. Instead he chooses a different partner: Reynaldo. But Vic pushes Reynaldo too hard to execute his artistic vision. Eventually, he learns that, in order to be a success, you have to be equal partners.
35	35	"Tree Buds"	Kayla Carlisle & Carmen Liang	Spencer Rothbell	October 19, 2019	037	0.59
Val is attempting to perfect his tree house, but Vic wants to help. He tells him to go get a hat rack to distract him and he steals a branch from El Arból Vampiro. Vic gets a splinter and starts turning into a tree. Now Val must get rid of something precious to him or else Vic and the rest of their friends will become part of a monstrous tree.
36	36	"Lonely Haunts Club 2: Doll Island"	Kayla Carlisle & Carmen Liang	Julie Whitesell	October 26, 2019	029	0.50
When Andres comes back with a souvenir from Doll Island, Vic and Val opt to go there themselves so that they can bring back Annie, the doll of Hairy Mary. Charlene and Pineapple compete with them to get the doll first. However, when they finally find the doll, they are accosted by Mary and her army of rats into giving it back to them.
37	37	"Cat-Pocalypse"	Leticia Silva & Daniel Villa De Rey	Julie Whitesell	October 26, 2019	033	0.50
In a loose parody of Rear Window, Vic gets sick and cannot sleep, so he spies on the neighbors. He spots Pineapple taking up a place in town and collecting cats in secrecy. With the help of Val and Don Jalapeño, they come to the conclusion that Pineapple is creating a zombie cat army for a cat-pocalypse and team up to try and thwart his plans.
38	38	"El Silbón"	April Amézquita & Chris Jiménez	Diego Molano & Julie Whitesell	October 26, 2019	040	0.48
Vic and Val create a scary corn maze that fails to scare anyone. At the suggestion of Charlene, they head out and search for El Silbón (The Whistler), a demon capable of scaring anyone. However, he turns out to be too good at his job and steals the skeletons of the kids of Monte Macabre. Now Vic must challenge him to a whistle-off.
39	39	"On Nagual Hill"	Daniel Villa De Rey, Leticia Silva & Zach Bellissimo	Isaac Gonzalez, Spencer Rothbell & Julie Whitesell	October 26, 2019	038	0.48
While out hiking, Vic and Val spot a good waterfall and transform it into a water slide for their friends. However, the animals are endangered and a Nagual transforms Vic and Val into a chicken and a donkey, respectively. When they realize that they have mistreated the animals, Vic and Val set off on a rescue mission to save the waterfall.
TBA	TBA	"Rival Stands"	Zeus Cervas, & Katherine Frasier	Isaac Gonzalez, & Tom Welch	Unaired	004	N/A
Vic and Val are competing in an annual food contest—they have to sell more tacos than the other competitors. They soon find out that Charlene and Pineapple add a mysterious liquid ingredient to their tacos to unwillingly attract more customers. Victor steals the liquid and adds the entirety of it to the recipe. However, this results in creating a giant chorizo monster, so Vic and Val have to find a way to stop him before he causes massive damage in Monte Macabre.: Note: This episode has never aired in America, though it was made available on HBO España in December 2020. According to HBO's page, this was supposed to be the 4th episode of the first season production-wise.

=== Season 2 (2020–21) ===
No. overall	No. in season	Title	Written and storyboarded by	Story by	Original release date	Prod. code	U.S. viewers (millions)
40	1	"The Guest"	Miggs Perez & Kayla Carlisle	Spencer Rothbell	April 18, 2020 (Note: This episode was first released online on April 10, 2020.)	1084-043	0.38
Victor and Valentino resolve that they need to travel to El Lucha Libre. But, they cannot do so because the kitchen is very messy. Chata forces the boys to clean it, even though neither claims that it was their fault. With Achi's help, they discover that the culprit is a ghost named Alfonso who was once a famous baseball player. He refuses to leave until his partner Moreno apologizes for a big game loss.
41	2	"Ener-G-Shoes"	Leticia Silva & Daniel Villa De Rey	Spencer Rothbell	April 18, 2020 (Note: This episode was first released online on December 27, 2019.)	1084-041	0.33
Vic and Val visit Maria Teresa's yard sale. Vic has his eyes set on a pair of Ener-G-Shoes, but they are expensive. He resorts to stealing them just so he can show them off. However, he fails to remember that Maria Teresa's objects are cursed and finds that not only are the shoes sentient, but also plan to off him for his crime.
42	3	"La Cucarachita"	Zach Bellissimo & Carmen Liang	Isaac Gonzalez	April 25, 2020	1084-042	0.31
Vic's beloved cockroach pet, Shely, suddenly dies after being stepped on by Chata. Wishing he could spend more time with her, Vic turns to Charlene to perform reanimation on her so she can live for one more day. After the day is over, Vic still wants to spend more time with her and in his haste accidentally brings Charlene's taxidermy to life.
43	4	"Lords of Ghost Town"	Miggs Perez & Kayla Carlisle	Isaac Gonzalez	April 25, 2020	1084-051	0.32
When Lupe takes over their tree house, Victor and Valentino use their new ghost seeing masks to recruit someone to scare her out. They find Paco, a ghost who was locked up and promises to help them out. Upon doing so however, he releases the rest of his motorcycle gang, the Lords of Ghost Town, and threatens to wreak havoc in Monte Macabre.
44	5	"My Fair Achi"	Carmen Liang & Zach Bellissimo	Isaac Gonzalez	May 2, 2020	1084-046	0.32
Vic and Val decide to enter Achi into a dog competition when their snooty, upper class rival Tula insults their behavior and enters herself. They promise Achi free chicharrónes if he complies. However, the brothers end up overworking Achi and humiliating him and he threatens to walk out on them when they begin to act like Tula.
45	6	"Oddities"	April Amézquita & Chris Jiménez	Spencer Rothbell	May 2, 2020	1084-048	0.30
Vic and Val head to Larry Ladron's carnival for some fun. Despite Chata's warning, the boys have a spat and decide to split to pursue their own interests. However, they are quick to discover that Larry's big secret is that he keeps an odditites exhibit composed of his own freaks and has Vic and Val join by conjoining them into a worm boy.
46	7	"I...... am Vampier"	Kayla Carlisle & Miggs Perez	Isaac Gonzalez	May 9, 2020 (Note: This episode was first released online on May 1, 2020.)	1084-047	0.34
Monte Macabre is holding its annual film festival. Vic and Val enter with the former deciding to make a film about a vampire detective. When Andres calls his idea "kids' stuff", Vic decides to copy others and changes his film. However, Val gets a copy of the original version and enters it, resulting in Vic trying to stop the release of the film.
47	8	"Victor the Predictor"	Leticia Silva & Daniel Villa De Rey	Spencer Rothbell	May 9, 2020	1084-045	0.36
Vic feels that he does not have any special talents like all the other people in Monte Macabre. The fortune teller Osvaldo Pescado arrives and claims that Vic has special psychic abilities. Vic becomes "Victor the Predictor" and begins making outrageous predictions. Val decides to prove that Waldo is a phony while Vic may have made some bad predictions.
48	9	"Kindred Spirits"	April Amézquita & Chris Jiménez	Isaac Gonzalez	May 16, 2020	1084-052	0.29
Val decides to see a classic silent film called La Señora de Oro by himself and ends up befriending the ghost of the lead actress Dolores Del Rey whom he shares a love of classic cinema with. However, Dolores has plans of her own with Val in that she plans to bring herself back to life by draining his youth and it is up to Vic to rescue his brother.
49	10	"Decoding Valentino"	April Amézquita & Chris Jiménez	Julie Whitesell & Diego Molano	May 16, 2020	1084-056	0.25
Val discovers some glyphs that he needs to decipher. Rather than take Vic, Val brings Isabella along with him to a secret underground dungeon to have them decoded. As they traverse through the traps, it becomes apparent that Isabella is faster and more adapt at solving them, frustrating Val. When Isabella is in danger, Val has to listen to her to save her.
50	11	"Journey to Maiz Mountain"	Kayla Carlisle, Miggs Perez, Leticia Silva & Daniel Villa De Rey	Spencer Rothbell, Diego Molano & Julie Whitesell	May 23, 2020 (Note: This episode was first released online on May 15, 2020.)	1084-053	0.35
51	12	"Journey to Maiz Mountain"	Kayla Carlisle, Miggs Perez, Leticia Silva & Daniel Villa De Rey	Spencer Rothbell, Diego Molano & Julie Whitesell	May 23, 2020	1084-055	0.35
While trying to cut in line, Vic and Val accidentally spill Sal's entire supply of corn. Not wanting to get in trouble with Chata or the rest of Monte Macabre, the boys demand that they help Sal get more corn from his supplier. This involves Sal having to shrink the three of them down to miniature size so that they can find a bird and fly to a valley of ants so that they can meet with the Queen and get more corn. However, the Queen and Sal have a rough romantic history and it will take the boys' cunning to get what they want or else face dire consequences.
52	13	"Escaramuza"	Miggs Perez & Kayla Carlisle	Isaac Gonzalez	October 5, 2020 (Note: This episode was first released online on October 2, 2020.)	1084-067	0.18
Val is a big fan of Escaramuza and is devastated when his favorite player Amabel is injured. He convinces Xochi to fill in for her so as to impress her. However, Xochi is no good and gives up to be with Amabel. Desperate, Val disguises himself as a girl and resorts to cheating to win, but he angers the original Escaramuza players from beyond the grave.
53	14	"Los Perdidos"	Zach Bellissimo & Carmen Liang	Isaac Gonzalez & Diego Molano	October 5, 2020	1084-054	0.18
Vic wants to join a gang of night skaters called Los Perdidos who do not have to follow any rules. After taking a drink from their punch bowl, Vic suddenly begins exhibiting vampire like behavior. Val learns the truth and heads out to rescue him from the gang, only to learn that their leader is Javier, who had formerly lead a hidden skate park.
54	15	"Los Pajaros"	Daniel Villa De Rey & Leticia Silva	Zach Paez	October 6, 2020	1084-065	0.23
On Huitzi's birthday, the town offers him gifts so that they can receive good luck. Val, being the sceptic that he is, half-heartedly gives him a disused calculous book and denounces that there is such a thing as luck. After getting a penny-farthing for himself, Val finds himself getting attacked by every avian creature in Monte Macabre for his carelessness.
55	16	"Get Your Sea Legs"	April Amézquita & Chris Jiménez	Zach Paez	October 7, 2020	1084-060	0.15
Vic gets made fun of for not being able to swim. Luckily, he meets a mermaid named Lana who is willing to teach him. Wanting to take a shortcut, she uses a pearl to switch legs with him, but she gets carried away and begins using it to switch with other people's legs. Vic teams up with Val to set things right as Monte Macabre's legs get distorted.
56	17	"Guillermo's Girlfriend"	Zach Bellissimo & Carmen Liang	Julie Whitesell	October 8, 2020	1084-062	0.15
While trying to collect worms in Guillermo's backyard, Vic and Val learn that Guillermo's "girlfriend", an artistic construct named Ripley, has been "swept away" by someone else. Realizing that she was taken out by a garbage man, Vic, Val and Guillermo head over to the dump to rescue her from the very strict garbage man who hates trespassers.
57	18	"Starry Night"	Miggs Perez & Kayla Carlisle	Spencer Rothbell	October 12, 2020 (Note: This episode was first released online on October 9, 2020.)	1084-059	0.20
Vic and Val get invited to Reynaldo and Reynalda's outdoor sleepover along with Rosita, Miguelito and Isabella. While Val tries to convince Vic to have fun despite the precautions, their friends suddenly begin to act weird and lead them into the forests. Vic and Val soon learn that their friends are possessed by Tzitzimime and want to know about Chata.
58	19	"Fueygo Fest"	April Amézquita & Chris Jiménez	Zach Paez	October 13, 2020	1084-064	0.20
In a parody of the infamous Fyre Festival disaster, Vic and Val decide to show up Tula by creating a luxury party for kids called Fueygo Fest using her island. However, Vic's lack of planning and his greed results in him scamming the other kids out of their money and creating an awful experience as his mistakes start to become more evident.: Note: This episode chronologically takes place after "The Cupcake Man".
59	20	"Folk Art Friends"	Daniel Villa De Rey & Leticia Silva	Isaac Gonzalez	October 14, 2020	1084-057	0.26
Vic and Val accidentally break three more alebrije statues, releasing the gluttonous caiman Botero, musically inclined monkey Miguel and the two headed flamingo comics Rick and Richard. Desperate to put them back and save Monte Macabre from destruction, the boys release Huehue to help them with recapturing them. However, Huehue has other plans.
60	21	"The Cupcake Man"	Leticia Silva, Daniel Villa De Rey & Arlyne Ramirez	Zach Paez	October 15, 2020	1084-061	0.18
When Vic's bad behavior gets out of control, Chata gets fed up and takes his skateboard away. When he tries to steal it back, she decides to send him to the Cupcake Man, a large intimidating figure who bakes cupcakes for a living. Vic attempts to rebel against his new employer, but the Cupcake Man does not go down easily and he empathizes with the boy.: Note: This episode chronologically takes place before "Fueygo Fest".
61	22	"Villainy In Monte Macabre"	Miggs Perez & Kayla Carlisle	Diego Molano & Isaac Gonzalez	October 19, 2020	1084-063	0.25
In a crossover episode with Villainous, Black Hat sends Dr. Flug and Demencia to secure an alien in disguise in Monte Macabre. They run into Vic and Val and team up to find the culprit. However, their differing ideas cause the group to split up so that they can cover more ground. In the end the culprit is Cacao, but Vic and Val may have made a mistake.: Note: This episode appears to be non-canon with the rest of the series.
62	23	"Charlene Mania"	Zach Bellissimo & Carmen Liang	Zach Paez	October 20, 2020 (Note: This episode was first released online on October 16, 2020.)	1084-066	0.26
Vic tries to have the perfect day off, but Charlene sprays him with a perfume that causes him to lose his hair. As Vic tries to go about his day, he begins to notice that everyone seems oddly obsessed with Charlene and soon all of Monte Macabre begins creating a cult based around her. Realizing her blunder, Charlene and Vic team up to set everything right.
63	24	"Old Man Teo"	April Amézquita, Chris Jiménez & Anna Lencioni	Spencer Rothbell	October 21, 2020	1084-068	0.18
Chata has Vic and Val volunteer at the old folks' home with the other kids. While Vic has fun with one of the elders, Val decides to take on the grumpy Old Man Teo who is the meanest elder in the home. Val manages to get through to him when he learns that he is Xiuhtecuhtli and that his headpiece was taken from him and they team up to reclaim his glory.
64	25	"Poacher Patrol"	Leticia Silva & Daniel Villa De Rey	Erin Shade	October 22, 2020	1084-069	0.30
Don Jalapeño needs someone to fill in for pool patrol duty and picks Val, who takes his job of authority very seriously. He spots who he thinks is a poacher and captures her. However, he learns that she is actually a heron expert who has been studying their patterns in an effort to keep the piranhas in check whom all break free and attack the pool goers.
65	26	"Lonely Haunts Club 3: La Llorona"	Zach Bellissimo & Carmen Liang	Diego Molano & Julie Whitesell	October 26, 2020	1084-050	0.22
Val tries looking for some alone time to get away from Vic's constant pranking and heads out to the woods. When he goes missing, Vic meets up with Charlene and Pineapple and learns about the legend of La Llorona, the ghostly weeping woman who takes children. Vic, Charlene and Pineapple discover La Llorona's house and get caught in a wild and scary adventure.: Note: This episode features a brief stop-motion segment from Cinema Phantasma.
66	27	"In Your Own Skin"	Miggs Perez & Kayla Carlisle	Zach Paez	October 27, 2020 (Note: This episode was first released online on October 23, 2020.)	1084-071	0.30
Val is mocked for his fashion sense at a high quality clothing store, yet Vic is hailed a genius with his impromptu "mooning" shirt. Val ends up finding comfort in a mysterious thrift shop owner named Xipe who possesses amazing knitting and sewing abilities. Accepted as his protégé, Val learns to accept his own skin and not what others are wearing.
67	28	"Ghosted"	Jason Dwyer	Julie Whitesell & Diego Molano	October 28, 2020	1084-074	0.25
Vic meets a ghost girl named Cristina who shares his love of pranking people. When the local Tlatchtli players ask Vic to join them, he chooses to ditch Cristina to play with the cool kids. However, when he is told to be their water boy rather than an actual player, Vic realizes the error of his ways and tries to reconnect with Cristina and apologize.
68	29	"Carmelita"	Zach Bellissimo & Carmen Liang	Spencer Rothbell	October 29, 2020	1084-058	0.22
Chata reveals that she has a car named Carmelita that was meant for Vic and Val when they get older. She loans it to Xochi on the condition that they drive it wherever they want. After getting it fixed at the body shop, Vic and Val abuse Xochi as their driver and anger her. However, Carmelita begins acting up and comes alive and starts to chase them.
69	30	"Las Pesadillas"	David Teas & Carmen Liang	Casey Alexander & Diego Molano	April 17, 2021	1084-079	0.16
Vic and Val suddenly begin to experience severe lucid dreaming which Don Jalapeño claims is the work of El Rey de los Sueños (The King of Dreams). When they go back to sleep, Val begins to take advantage of his dreams while Vic wants nothing to do with them. When he learns that Tez is behind the dreaming, Vic must save his brother from sleeping forever.
70	31	"Baby Pepito"	Daniel Villa De Rey & Leticia Silva	Spencer Rothbell	April 24, 2021	1084-073	0.22
A mysterious baby shows up on Chata's doorstep and she takes to naming him Baby Pepito, short for José. Vic and Val immediately suspect that something is wrong when the baby displays demon like qualities and tries to supposedly devour them. They recruit Don Jalapeño who informs the two that it is a Chaneque, a mimic who eats the souls of its victims.
71	32	"Cenote Seekers"	Casey Alexander, April Amézquita & Chris Jiménez	Spencer Rothbell	May 1, 2021	1084-077	0.20
Vic and Val miss Xochi as she takes the other kids to a cenote out in the desert because Vic was reading comics in the bathroom. The brothers decide to take their bikes and Val ends up getting sun tan lotion all over the map after Vic wastes water. They get lost and begin to hallucinate in the desert, unaware that they are actually getting closer to the cenote.
72	33	"My Thirsty Little Monster"	Daniel Villa De Rey & Leticia Silva	Zach Paez	May 8, 2021	1084-078	0.18
Vic adopts a baby Camazotz and names it Cammy. After convincing Val to help keep him, he proceeds to train Cammy to be obedient to him, though he still needs to feed on blood. However, Val cannot stand him, especially when he ruins his mint coin collection. When the boys start a fire and get trapped in their room, only Cammy can come and save the day.
73	34	"La Planchada"	April Amézquita & Chris Jiménez	Spencer Rothbell	May 8, 2021	1084-044	0.16
Val has chicken pox which Vic quickly contracts. Refusing to believe that he is sick, Vic ends up spreading the pox to the other kids in Monte Macabre. Alma Creator informs Vic about La Planchada and how to summon her to cure him. However, La Planchada sees Vic as wicked and demands he make amends with his friends or else she will iron him out.
74	35	"Tez Breaks Bread"	Zach Bellissimo & Carmen Liang	Zach Paez	May 15, 2021	1084-070	0.22
Vic, Val and Chata get an invitation to a party hosted by Tez. A magical perfume suddenly gives Chata the gumption to force the boys to attend, much to their displeasure. Tez enamors the crowd with his tricks while the boys try to out him for his crimes. However, when Tez makes Val disappear into a mirror, Vic must make a horrific deal with Charlene to save him.
75	36	"Through the Nine Realms of Mictlan"	Casey Alexander, Diego Molano, Zach Bellissimo, Miggs Perez, Kayla Carlisle, April Amézquita, Carmen Liang, Chris Jiménez, David Teas, Josiah Iantorno & Marty Martin	Diego Molano, Casey Alexander, Spencer Rothbell, Zach Paez & Erin Shade	May 29, 2021	1084-072	0.18
76	37	"Through the Nine Realms of Mictlan"	Casey Alexander, Diego Molano, Zach Bellissimo, Miggs Perez, Kayla Carlisle, April Amézquita, Carmen Liang, Chris Jiménez, David Teas, Josiah Iantorno & Marty Martin	Diego Molano, Casey Alexander, Spencer Rothbell, Zach Paez & Erin Shade	May 29, 2021	1084-075	0.18
77	38	"Through the Nine Realms of Mictlan"	Casey Alexander, Diego Molano, Zach Bellissimo, Miggs Perez, Kayla Carlisle, April Amézquita, Carmen Liang, Chris Jiménez, David Teas, Josiah Iantorno & Marty Martin	Diego Molano, Casey Alexander, Spencer Rothbell, Zach Paez & Erin Shade	May 29, 2021	1084-076	0.18
78	39	"Through the Nine Realms of Mictlan"	Casey Alexander, Diego Molano, Zach Bellissimo, Miggs Perez, Kayla Carlisle, April Amézquita, Carmen Liang, Chris Jiménez, David Teas, Josiah Iantorno & Marty Martin	Diego Molano, Casey Alexander, Spencer Rothbell, Zach Paez & Erin Shade	May 29, 2021	1084-080	0.18
Cristina and her family are finally headed to Mictlan, the peaceful afterlife. Not wanting to see her go, Victor beckons her to pull one last troll on Don Jalapeño with him, though Valentino quickly suspects his duplicity. Cristina misses her train, so the boys swipe Sal's flute and transport themselves to the ninth realm, only to run afoul of the Bone Boys who send them on a journey. Victor acts incredibly selfish and Valentino is constantly worrying, but must work together if they are to help Cristina reach the ninth realm. They must traverse a lake of lava to reach an island, run through twin stone mountains that are slowly closing in on them and fight their dark reflections who attempt to trap them in dark mirrors for eternity. Victor, Valentino and Cristina continue their journey by traversing a windy terrain. Next, they must navigate through a maze of flags made from skinned travelers and reunite with a repentant Delores Del Rey. They end up in a desert that is constantly pelted with arrows and team up with the Lords of Ghost Town to make it out of the realm and to paradise. Valentino must face his fears by teaming up with Shelly to rescue his party from a giant worm beast. Afterwards, the group end up in a foggy realm where they are subjected to a game show like scenario. When Victor accidentally reveals his fault behind their adventure, he must make sure that Cristina and their friends make it to the ninth realm before time runs out.: Note: Based on Vic's comments, this episode chronologically takes place before "Bone Bike".

=== Season 3 (2021–22) ===
No. overall	No. in season	Title	Written and storyboarded by	Story by	Original release date	Prod. code	U.S. viewers (millions)
79	1	"Sal's Our Pal"	Kayla Carlisle, David Teas, Leticia Silva & Daniel Villa De Rey	Spencer Rothbell, Casey Alexander & Diego Molano	September 4, 2021	1100-081	0.15
80	2	"Sal's Our Pal"	Kayla Carlisle, David Teas, Leticia Silva & Daniel Villa De Rey	Spencer Rothbell, Casey Alexander & Diego Molano	September 4, 2021	1100-082	0.15
Tez is running for Huey Tlatoani in Monte Macabre, essentially a mayor. Despite his sinister motives, everyone seems to be on board with his ideals except for Vic, Val, Chata, and Sal. Tez explains that he is Tlatoani blood related and therefore capable of running. When Sal is revealed to also have blood relations, Vic and Val push him to run against Tez and manage to secure enough support. However, Tez calls upon the Tzitzimime to have everyone vote for him. After Vic, Val and Sal defeat them, an inadvertent misunderstanding about stopping the votes causes Tez to win.
81	3	"The Fog"	April Amézquita & Chris Jiménez	Zach Paez, Diego Molano & Casey Alexander	September 11, 2021	1100-083	0.21
With Tez ruining everything, Vic and Val resolve to call their dad and leave Monte Macabre for good. However, when they reach of the border of town, they keep getting transported back. They try and get Tez's staff, but he captures them. He learns they want to leave and allows them to, but they can never come back once they do. Realizing they cannot leave their friends behind, Vic and Val resolve to stay to stop him.
82	4	"There's No V in Team"	Lauren McKinley & Makena Bajar	Erin Shade, Casey Alexander & Diego Molano	September 18, 2021	1100-084	0.15
Due to Vic's inability to work with the other kids, Don Jalapeño ends up banning the kids from playing soccer. As a result, an underground soccer league is formed by Isabella, but Vic continues to make a mess of it while Don tries to crack down. Although Don finds out about the league, Vic takes responsibility for it and decides to challenge Don to a soccer game, in hopes of being able to resume playing the sport.
83	5	"Showdown at the Mayahuel Gardens"	Leticia Silva & Daniel Villa De Rey	Erin Shade, Diego Molano & Casey Alexander	September 25, 2021	1100-085	N/A
At the Mayahuel Gardens, Val, Vic, and Chata see Charlene, Maria Theresa, and Pineapple. After the kids leave, Maria Teresa and Chata have to work together to find them and find common ground. However, the kids create a spider-like maguey creature which takes them captive. Although the kids are saved and they apologize, the elders proceed to begin fighting one another again.
84	6	"The Bodyguard"	April Amézquita & Chris Jiménez	Zach Paez, Casey Alexander & Diego Molano	October 2, 2021	1100-087	0.14
Tez creates the Jaguar Patrol for Monte Macabre. When Don Jalapeño finds out, he joins the team. Vic and Val try to have him kicked out, but after outing his obsession to Tez, he instead gets promoted to personal bodyguard. In the end, Don ends up ruining himself and gets fired, but Tez secretly makes him his chief of surveillance and asks him to keep an eye on Vic and Val.
85	7	"Miguelito The Mosquito"	Lauren McKinley & Makena Bajar	Spencer Rothbell, Casey Alexander & Diego Molano	October 9, 2021	1100-088	0.18
Miguelito accidentally overtakes the title of town daredevil from Vic and earns the nickname Miguelito the Mosquito. Growing jealous, Vic challenges him with riding Thunder, the most savage hog in Monte Macabre. Vic uses a pendant from Charlene to give the hog powers, but regrets it upon meeting Miguelito's younger brother. They save each other and earn the respect of veteran daredevil La Pulga.
86	8	"Patolli"	April Amézquita & Chris Jiménez	Erin Shade, Casey Alexander & Diego Molano	October 16, 2021	1100-091	0.15
Isabella introduces Patolli to Vic and Val where the latter suddenly gains a winning streak; making him obsessed with the game. When he suddenly begins to lose the game and everything, he becomes despondent until he meets Xochi Pilli who challenges him to a high stakes version of the game. Val wins, but decides to forfeit the title. Pilli sends him back in time to before getting introduced to the game.
87	9	"Plan-De-Monium" (Plan-Demonium)	Leticia Silva & Daniel Villa De Rey	Erin Shade, Diego Molano & Casey Alexander	October 23, 2021	1100-089	0.17
Val plans an itinerary with Isabella for the day, but Vic, Chata, Cammy and Huitzi all come in and "ruin" it with distractions that do not seem to bother her. After missing a comet he planned to see, Val realizes that everyone is having fun except for him and he finally tosses away his agenda so that he can dance under the stars with Isabella while also accepting to be more incongruous.
88	10	"The Puzzle Master"	David Teas, Kayla Carlisle, Lauren McKinley & Makena Bajar	Zach Paez, Casey Alexander & Diego Molano	October 26, 2021	1100-098	0.07
89	11	"The Puzzle Master"	David Teas, Kayla Carlisle, Lauren McKinley & Makena Bajar	Zach Paez, Casey Alexander & Diego Molano	October 26, 2021	1100-100	0.07
Vic, Val, Charlene and Pineapple wake up in a strange room and learn that they must complete a series of challenges from the Puzzle Master. Pineapple injures himself and his body begins to deflate. The group make it through numerous rooms and complete tasks before coming face to face with a giant patchwork monster. Together, they defeat it and Pineapple returns to normal. It is revealed that Charlene was the Puzzle Master and just wanted to spend time with the boys. However, Vic, Val and Pineapple are all horrified to learn that she accidentally put them in another game room.
90	12	"Finding Posada"	April Amézquita & Chris Jiménez	Lalo Alcaraz, Diego Molano & Casey Alexander	November 1, 2021	1100-099	0.13
To win best ofrenda for Dia de los Muertos, Vic and Val recruit famed artist José Guadalupe Posada to get advice. Not able to keep up, Vic and Val trick him into doing all the work for them. Realizing what had happened, Posada takes the ofrenda away, forcing Vic and Val to hastily make a new one. They lose, but their ancestors are nevertheless, honored at the tribute.
91	13	"La Catrina" (Little Grown-Up Man)	Kayla Carlisle & David Teas	Zach Paez, Diego Molano & Casey Alexander	November 1, 2021	1100-090	0.13
Val heads to the underworld, posing as an adult, to listen to La Catrina sing at an adults only club. Vic follows him and the ruse falls apart. However, Val realizes that La Catrina is a fake and has been using a record to lip sync to. Vic and Val battle her and her bodyguard using food. As the boys escape back home, the cab driver begins to sing, implying that she was the real La Catrina.
92	14	"Bone Bike"	Kayla Carlisle & David Teas	Spencer Rothbell, Diego Molano & Casey Alexander	November 13, 2021	1100-086	0.19
Vic and Val enter a race to get tickets to a Lucha fight. Mic and Hun give them a bone bike that they must hastily tame during the race. Not knowing what to do, Vic and Val treat the bone bike terribly before realizing that they need to be nice to it. They manage to win the race, but it turned out to be a ruse by Mic and Hun, just so they can have "lunch" with the two for winning.: Note: Based on Vic's comments, this episode chronologically takes place after "Through the Nine Realms of Mictlan".
93	15	"Butterman!"	Leticia Silva & Daniel Villa De Rey	Zach Paez, Casey Alexander & Diego Molano	November 20, 2021	1100-093	0.15
Sal is saddened over Tez destroying the butterfly habitat to make way for a bowling alley. Vic and Val try to help him when he tells them of the Butterman. After failing to get public opinion to turn around, the three resort to attacking the workers and Sal is revealed to be the Butterman and defeats them, with the public turning around. However, Tez exiles Sal from Monte Macabre effective immediately.
94	16	"El Bigote"	Lauren McKinley & Makena Bajar	Spencer Rothbell, Casey Alexander & Diego Molano	November 27, 2021	1100-092	0.15
In order to become a luchador, Vic interns with veteran El Bigote. However, he turns out to be a blowhard and starts giving him bad advice. Val challenges El Bigote to a fight where it is revealed that he is being helped by the ghost of Rey Mysterio Sr. Vic realizes that El Bigote has been taking advantage of him and the brothers team up and take him down. Rey Mysterio offers to help train Vic some day.
95	17	"The Matchmaker"	Daniel Villa De Rey & Leticia Silva	Zach Paez	March 7, 2022	1100-097	0.12
Val discovers that he has a talent for matchmaking, but when Isabella asks to match her up, he is too nervous and sets her up with cool kid Ramon, despite her making it obvious she likes him. With Vic's help, he goes to stop her date and they get into a fight. Isabella admits that she likes him and Val admits that he was just scared. She calms him and the two decide to date for real, to Vic's relief.
96	18	"Pastry Peril"	April Amézquita & Chris Jiménez	Erin Shade, Casey Alexander & Diego Molano	March 7, 2022	1100-103	0.13
When Vic eats somebody's order at Lupe's bakery, her grandmother forces him to pay off his debt by working alongside her. Vic and Lupe have trouble working together and end up destroying an important cake. The finally work together to make a new one and give the order to Maria Teresa who likes it so much that she orders a dozen more. Vic pays off his debt, but now must help Lupe bake the others.
97	19	"Pokin’ ‘n’ Proddin’" (Pokin and Proddin)	April Amézquita & Chris Jiménez	Erin Shade, Diego Molano & Casey Alexander	March 8, 2022	1100-095	0.15
Val interns at Tez's administration under the name Cristobal in order to get info on him. He ends up enjoying office comradery, much to Vic's annoyance. Reyna witnesses something and is taken to get her memory wiped. Val is about to have his wiped until Vic comes and saves him; agreeing not to get too deep again. Tez speaks with a strange alien crytptid with plans to continue his work.
98	20	"Stolen Retriever"	Leticia Silva & Daniel Villa De Rey	Spencer Rothbell, Casey Alexander & Diego Molano	March 8, 2022	1100-105	0.14
In order to get more eyeball candies, Vic learns that when he returns lost dogs, he gets money. He begins to steal dogs, much to Val's disapproval, but starts to mix them up due to his incompetence. One dog turns out to be an Ahuizotl and kidnaps one of the owners. With the help of the other dogs, Vic is forced to give up his eyeball candies to rescue the owner from being devoured.
99	21	"Jump Scare"	Leticia Silva & Daniel Villa De Rey	Erin Shade, Diego Molano & Casey Alexander	March 9, 2022	1100-101	0.16
Vic starts to feel like a third wheel when Val and Isabella begin going on dates more often. He decides to break them up by setting them up on a bad date at the dark crossroads, only for Charlene to tell him about the Cihuateteo, which Vic misinterprets as "Chi-were-hua", and goes to "rescue" them. Vic apologizes while Val and Isabella reaffirm their relationship with him; improving it.
100	22	"An Evening with Mic and Hun"	Kayla Carlisle & David Teas	Julie Whitesell	March 9, 2022	1100-106	0.16
To get out of having dinner with Chata's comadres, Vic and Val use Mic and Hun's tickets and get flung into the Underworld where they must partake in a party game of finding Hun's body parts. The two manage to win the game, but by the end, realize that it would have been better to stay with Chata and her comadres and agree to have dinner with them the next night instead of with Mic and Hun.
101	23	"Another Don"	Kayla Carlisle & David Teas	Zach Paez	March 10, 2022	1100-102	N/A
Chata's water pitcher goes missing as Vic and Val decide to look for it with Isabella joining them. They conclude that Don Jalapeño is the culprit, but after Isabella leaves, Vic and Val encounter two Dons and manage to root the fake one before chasing him to a cave. They find the pitcher and Isabella who sheds her skin to unveil herself as a horrifying monster, causing Val to faint.: Note: This episode chronologically takes place after "Mission Mariachi".
102	24	"Starry Eyes"	Makena Bajar & Lauren McKinley	Casey Alexander, Diego Molano & Spencer Rothbell	March 10, 2022	1100-104	N/A
Don Jalapeño and Xochi find Vic and Val and begin to gather clues where Val realizes that he does not know any personal information about Isabella. They are lead to some rock formations before Isabella arrives at Don's store and appears perfectly fine. Val goes with her and she reveals herself as a Mega-mime; her true form. Vic, Xochi and Don chase her off as Don predicts that darkness is coming.
103	25	"Guillermo in G Flat"	Casey Alexander, April Amézquita & Chris Jiménez	Casey Alexander	June 6, 2022	1100-107	0.09
While trying to write a song, Val gets an earworm from Vic. He goes to a strange music store where a girl named Melodia gives him a music sheet to play for Vic. The music traps him in eternal torment and Guillermo and Ripley offer their services. After performing strange tasks, Guillermo has Val use his strange instrument to create a new song; resulting in the curse being lifted and Vic returning to normal.
104	26	"Para-Vic"	April Amézquita & Chris Jiménez	Erin Shade, Diego Molano & Casey Alexander	June 7, 2022	1100-111	0.15
With his pranks getting stale, Vic turns to Charlene to turn him into a ghost. He meets a prankster named Ximena who upon learning that his body is an empty shell, possesses it to prank the living. Vic manages to contact Val and Charlene and he pulls a new prank that expels Ximena; making her realize that she taught Vic something and allowing her to pass on into the underworld.
105	27	"Undercover Grandmother"	Leticia Silva & Daniel Villa De Rey	Spencer Rothbell, Casey Alexander & Diego Molano	June 8, 2022	1100-109	0.12
Chata is tasked with fixing a painting, but it somehow gets ruined. Due to its civic importance, she goes on the run from the Jaguar Patrol and tries to find proof of her innocence. She at first comes to the conclusion that Maria Teresa is the culprit, but through process of elimination and other clues, realizes that it was actually Val who did it. To make up for it, Chata and Val agree to fix the painting together.
106	28	"The Imposter"	Kayla Carlisle & David Teas	Erin Shade, Diego Molano & Casey Alexander	June 9, 2022	1100-110	0.15
Vic and Val stop by the Cupcake Man's cafe to get information on Tez, provided by Alma. However a Tzitzimime arrives to steal the file; forcing the Cupcake Man to trap everyone, including Don, Xochi and Lupe inside. Everyone has difficulty trusting each other as the creature possesses Alma, then the Cupcake Man. Despite their best efforts, the Tzitzimime succeeds in destroying the file and flees.
107	29	"Pobrecito Pete"	Kayla Carlisle & David Teas	Diego Molano, Casey Alexander & Zach Paez	August 22, 2022	1100-119	0.08
While trying to deliver rotten fruit to Vic, Val accidentally leaves it out and believes that Pete, Gustavo's horse, ate it and is poisoned. Vic, Val and Charlene hurry to whip up an antidote to cure him before he dies. The last ingredient is tears of guilt and Val finally admits that he accidentally poisoned Pete. It turns out that Pete is a girl and was giving birth and Charlene knew and was messing with Val.
108	30	"Vic-lene" (Viclene)	Leticia Silva & Daniel Villa De Rey	Julie Whitesell	August 22, 2022	1100-113	N/A
Vic wants to join a club involving aliens, so Charlene switches bodies with him so he can join. Vic gets sidetracked by numerous things and discovers that the club is a book club while Charlene tries to ask Val and Chata personal questions about Vic. Charlene tells Vic that she wanted him to see things through her eyes so that he will like her more. He admits that he does not hate her and she records this, albeit in her voice.
109	31	"Home Sweet Hole"	Makena Bajar & Lauren McKinley	Casey Alexander, Diego Molano & Julie Whitesell	August 23, 2022 (Note: This episode was first released online on August 22, 2022.)	1100-118	0.17
Vic and Miguelito discover that Gustavo is digging a hole. Vic claims it for himself, leading to Miguelito and Gustavo to make their own and they all go to war. Vic digs a tunnel for himself but gets lost until the other two boys find him. Using the termites, they manage to dig their way out to the surface and create an even bigger hole with a lake in the middle of it. The three of them decide to share it.
110	32	"Star Child"	Makena Bajar & Lauren McKinley	Zach Paez	August 23, 2022	1100-112	0.15
Isabella disguises herself as Guillermo to get close to Val, only to discover that a party was being thrown in his honor. Vic and Val are part of a prophecy to destroy the Tzitzimime, but Isabella cannot bring herself to end them. Instead, she prevents another Tzitzimime from killing the two, but Val is still upset with her and she leaves in tears. She recounts her story to the Tzitzimime and pledges her allegiance to them.
111	33	"Mission Mariachi"	Lauren McKinley & Makena Bajar	Spencer Rothbell, Diego Molano & Casey Alexander	August 24, 2022	1100-096	0.09
Val and Isabella camp outside to wait for Mariachi Reyna de Los Angeles, but accidentally wait on the opposite side of the line and fail to get tickets. Isabella reveals that she knows what hotel they are staying at and Val sneaks in in order to see them. After several run ins, he manages to charm them, but flees. To Val and Isabella's surprise, they left two VIP tickets just for them and they are able to see the show together.: Note: This episode chronologically takes place before "Another Don". It is also the only episode where Victor is absent, making Valentino the only character to appear in every episode.
112	34	"A Simpler Life: Ayohuih Nemilitzli"	Lauren McKinley & Makena Bajar	Spencer Rothbell, Diego Molano & Casey Alexander	August 24, 2022	1100-108	0.09
Still upset over Isabella's betrayal, Val goes to Xipe for something simple. He and Vic end up transported back in time to Tenochtitlan where they meet the ancestors of all their friends. They take part in a Flower War where Vic tells Val that he should not run away from his problems. Vic and Val's team wins and they find Xipe who transports them back to present day, wearing some rather avant-garde clothing.
113	35	"Oneiric Vic"	Peter Chung	N/A	August 25, 2022	1100-120	0.10
In this dialogue-free episode, Vic encounters a tribal boy while outrunning a stone jaguar. When the boy is supposedly eaten by the jaguar, Vic attempts to rescue him from inside it, but Val arrives and takes the golden idol that was stolen and returns it, making the stone jaguar immobile. Vic cries over his friend until he sees a bird that resembles the boy's mask and he happily lets it peck his head.
114	36	"Lonely Haunts Club 4: La Pablita"	Kayla Carlisle & David Teas	Julie Whitesell	August 25, 2022	1100-094	0.09
Charlene convinces Vic and Val to join her and Pineapple to an abandoned bridal store. They soon realize that the place is haunted by La Pablita, a bride who died from a spider bite and whose soul now possesses a mannequin. La Pablita comes to life and chases after the kids, but Pineapple figures out that she is sad because she is not wearing her dress. Upon giving her her bridal gown, she becomes their friend.
115	37	"Xochi's Garden"	Jason Dwyer, April Amézquita, Daniel Villa De Rey, Leticia Silva & Chris Jiménez	Spencer Rothbell	August 26, 2022	1084-049	0.16
Don steps out while Xochi tends to her garden. Vic and Val arrive to get fruit and discover the garden in the back and spot Xochi controlling a plant version of Amabel. Xochi reveals that she has had chlorokinesis since childhood and has kept it secret. Angered that they know of her powers, Vic and Val decide to tell her their darkest secrets (inaudible to the viewer) and she lets them go.
116	38	"Into the Obsidian"	Leticia Silva & Daniel Villa De Rey	Zach Paez	August 26, 2022	1100-114	0.14
Vic and Val realize that the black mirror that is in everyone's house is a window for Tez to spy on people. No one believes them except Charlene who tells them that they are portals. They go through them and steal a scepter while getting chased by a giant mirror golem. After a lengthy chase, they defeat it in Don's store where he reveals to the brothers that the scepter is an evil weapon.
117	39	"Follow the North Star"	April Amézquita & Chris Jiménez	Erin Shade, Casey Alexander & Diego Molano	August 26, 2022	1100-115	0.13
Vic and Val realize that Tez is Tezcatlipoca and is trying to bring about the end of the world. They set off to look for Quetzalcoatl and encounter Sal. The brothers proceed to encounter a variety of illusions that test their self-doubt, but they manage to overcome all of it. They discover that Sal was Quetzalcoatl this whole time and convince him to return to Monte Macabre.
118	40	"Fall of the Fifth Sun" (Fall of the 5th Sun)	Lauren McKinley, Makena Bajar, David Teas & Kayla Carlisle	Diego Molano, Casey Alexander, Zach Paez, Erin Shade & Spencer Rothbell	August 26, 2022	1100-116	0.11
119	41	"Fall of the Fifth Sun" (Fall of the 5th Sun)	Lauren McKinley, Makena Bajar, David Teas & Kayla Carlisle	Diego Molano, Casey Alexander, Zach Paez, Erin Shade & Spencer Rothbell	August 26, 2022	1100-117	0.11
The Boys return Sal to Monte Macabre and tell Xochi that Don has been arrested. While she goes to rescue him, Vic and Val confront Tez. Isabella returns to rescue Val, but she is killed by Tez. Vic and Val retrieve a vase that belonged to their grandfather and once it is filled with rain water, Sal drinks from it and transforms back into Quetzalcoatl. He and Tez battle, but with so much destruction, Vic and Val remind them that they are brothers and they cease fighting. Tez removes the curse around Monte Macabre, reawakening numerous people there as ancient gods, including Huitzi and Chata, the latter of whom has something to tell Vic and Val. Tez is captured by Coyolxāuhqui, who plots to continue her plan of destroying the world, ending the series on a cliffhanger.
