= Nyctimene =

Nyctimene may refer to:

- Nyctimene (genus), a genus of bats in the family Pteropodidae
- Nyctimene (mythology), a character in Greek mythology, the daughter of Epopeus, a king of Lesbos
- 2150 Nyctimene (1977 TA), an inner main-belt asteroid discovered in 1977 by W. Sebok at Palomar
