= Minyades =

Three sisters in Greek mythology

The Minyades (Ancient Greek: Μινυάδες, romanized: Minuádes, lit. 'daughters of Minyas') were three Orchomenian (Arcadian) princesses in Greek mythology. These sisters were protagonists of a myth about the perils of neglecting the worship of Dionysus.

== Names and family ==
The names of the Minyades were Alcathoe (or Alcithoe), Leucippe (Ovid uses "Leuconoe", instead) and Arsippe (Claudius Aelianus calls her "Aristippa"; Plutarch calls her "Arsinoë).

They were daughters of Minyas, king of Orchomenus, Boeotia.

Comparative names and family of Minyades
Relation	Name	Sources			
Relation	Name	Ovid	Plutarch	Antoninus	Aelian
Parentage	Minyas	✓	✓	✓	✓
Names	Leuconoe or	✓			
Names	Leucippe		✓	✓	✓
Names	Alcithoe or	✓			✓
Names	Alcathoe		✓	✓	
Names	Arsinoe or		✓		
Names	Arsippe or			✓	
Names	Aristippe				✓
Children	Hippasus, son of Leucippe			✓	

== Mythology ==
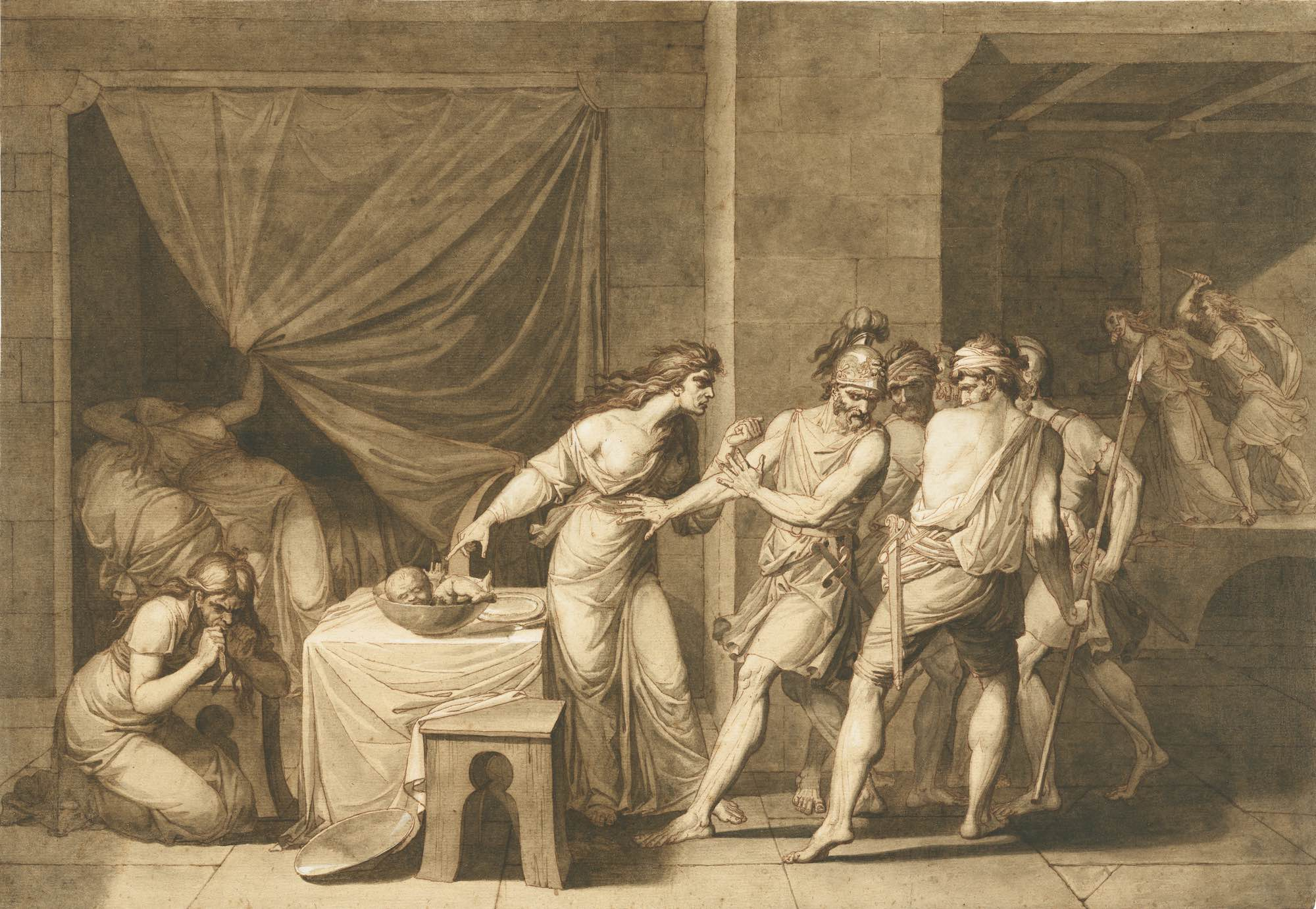
Étienne-Barthélémy Garnier, One of the Minyades showing the dismembered body of Hippasus.

At the time when the worship of Dionysus was introduced into Boeotia, and while the other women and maidens were reveling and ranging over the mountains in Bacchic joy, these sisters alone remained at home, devoting themselves to their usual occupations, and thus profaning the days sacred to the god. Dionysus punished them by changing them into bats, and their work into vines. Plutarch, Aelian, and Antoninus Liberalis, though with some differences in the detail, relate that Dionysus appeared to the sisters in the form of a maiden, and invited them to partake in the Dionysian Mysteries. When the sisters declined the invitation, the god metamorphosed himself successively into a bull, a lion, and a panther, and the sisters were driven mad.

In this state of madness, they were eager to honor the god, and Leucippe, who was chosen by lot to offer a sacrifice to Dionysus, gave up her own son Hippasus, whom the sisters tore to pieces. The sisters afterwards roamed over the mountains in a frenzy, until at last Hermes changed them into bats. Plutarch adds that down to his time the men of Orchomenus descended from that family were called psoloeis (ψολόεις), that is, mourners, and the women oleiai or aioleiai (ὀλεῖαι or αἰολεῖαι), that is, the destroyers.

=== Antoninus' account ===
Another retelling of the wrathful punishment of the Minyades by the god Dionysus appeared in Antoninus Liberalis' Metamorphoses:

The daughters of Minyas, son of Orchomenus, were Leucippe, Arsippe and Alcathoe. They turned out to be startlingly diligent. They strongly criticized other women because they abandoned the city to go as Bacchantes in the hills until Dionysus took on the likeness of a girl and urged the Minyades not to miss out on the rites or mysteries of the god. But they paid no heed to him. At this—not surprisingly—Dionysus was angered and instead of a girl became a bull, then a lion, then a leopard. From the beams of their looms there flowed for him milk and nectar.

At these portents, terror gripped the maidens. Without delay, the three threw lots into a pot and shook it. The lot fell to Leucippe and she vowed to offer as a sacrifice to the god her own son Hippasus whom she tore to pieces with the help of her sisters. Abandoning their paternal home, they went as Bacchantes in the mountains, browsing on ivy, honeysuckle, and laurel, until Hermes touched them with his wand and changed them into flying creatures. One of them became a bat, another an owl and the third an eagle owl. And all three continuously avoided the light of the sun.

== See also ==
- Leutogi - Polynesian bat goddess
- Camazotz - Mayan bat god
- Nyctimene (mythology)
