= Gesellschaft für Internationale Geldgeschichte =

German research organization

Association for International History of Money
- Gesellschaft für Internationale Geldgeschichte e.V.
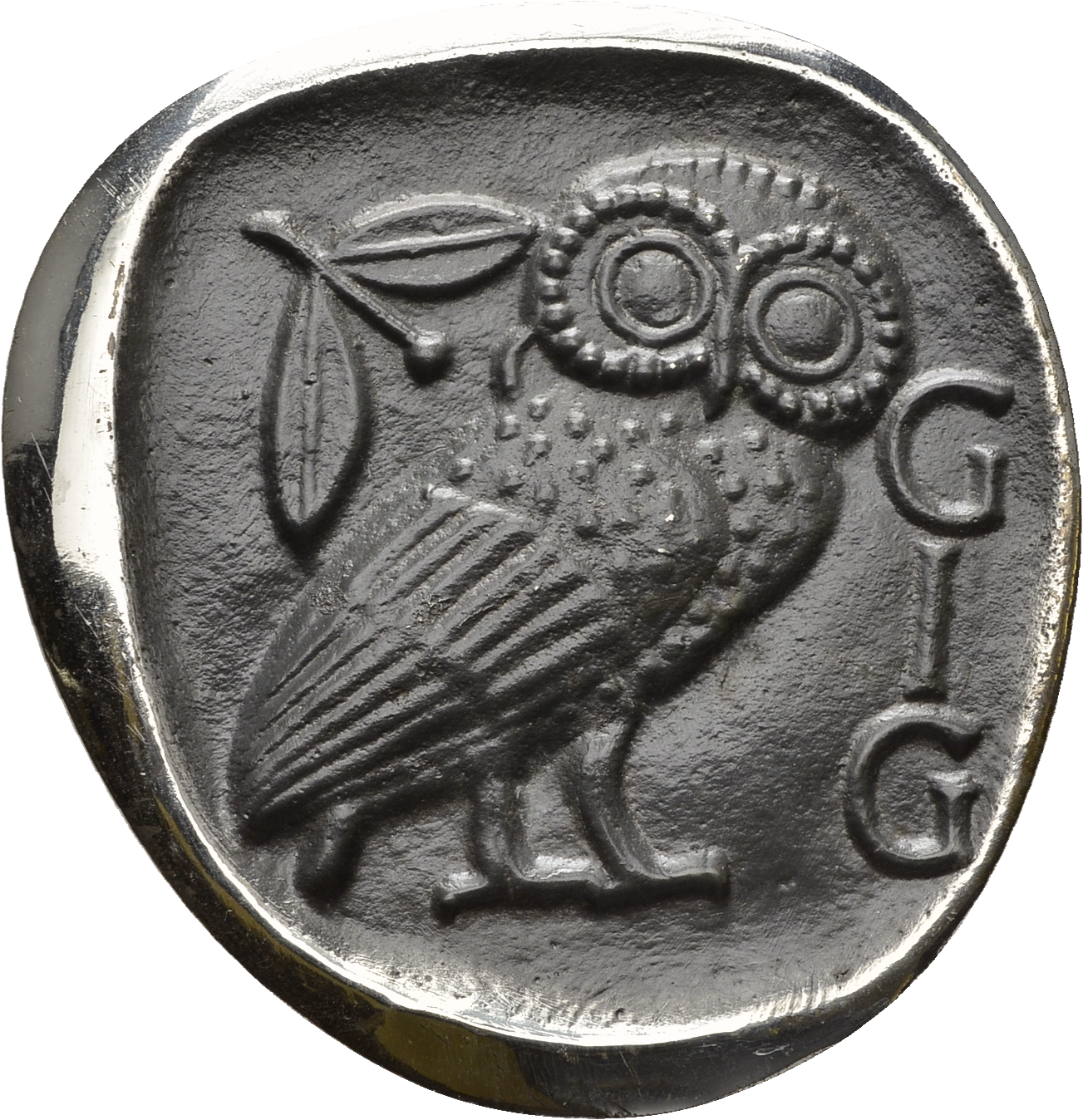
- Emblem of the association, based on an Attic tetradrachm (about 430 B.C.) with the association's initials
- Abbreviation: GIG
- Formation: 1965
- Type: Non-profit organisation
- Legal status: Charity
- Location: Frankfurt am Main Germany
- Members: 800 (2014)
- Official language: German
- President: Christian Stoess
- Website: http://www.gig-geldgeschichte.de
- Formerly called: Museum für Internationale Geldgeschichte gemeinnützige Forschungsgesellschaft e.V.

The Gesellschaft für Internationale Geldgeschichte (GIG - Association for International History of Money) is a non-profit organisation incorporated in Frankfurt am Main in Germany, dedicated to scientific research in history of money (in particular numismatics) and medal science.

== History ==
GIG was founded in 1965 under the name „Museum für Internationale Geldgeschichte gemeinnützige Forschungsgesellschaft e.V.“. Its first president was Willy Fuchs (President 1965–1971 and 1971–1992), followed by Kurt Jaeger (1971–1974). Since 1992, Christian Stoess has been president.

Since its establishment, GIG has issued Geldgeschichtliche Nachrichten (History of Money News).

As of 2014, GIG has about 800 members in 30 countries across five continents.

Since 1974, GIG has awarded an annual prize to numismatists or other monetary historians. The first laureate was Peter Berghaus.

== Mission ==
In #2 of its articles, GIG quotes the following mission tasks, among others:

- Promotion of scientific research in all areas of the history of coins, money and currencies as well as medal science
- Publication of one-off and periodic papers (Geldgeschichtliche Nachrichten)
- Providing of information on questions of coinage, monetary systems and medals as well as history of media of exchange
- Maintenance of a relevant lending library for study purposes and an archive with records on coinage and history of money
- Organization of events (lectures, collectors' meetings, exchange evenings, exhibitions and excursions)
- Loan of instructional and illustrative material
- Promotion of the collection of coins, other monetary tokens and medals
