= Camazotz =

Mayan god

- Night, death, and sacrifice
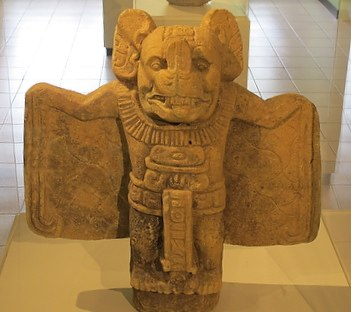
- Other names: Cama-Zotz
- Animals: Bat

Equivalents
- Polynesian: Leutogi

In the Late Post-Classic Maya mythology of the Popol Vuh, Camazotz (/kɑːməˈsɒts/ from Mayan /kama ˈsots’/) (alternate spellings Cama-Zotz, Sotz, Zotz) is a bat spirit at the service of the lords of the underworld. Camazotz means "death bat" in the Kʼicheʼ language. In Mesoamerica generally, the bat is often associated with night, death, and sacrifice.

== Etymology ==
Camazotz is formed from the Kʼicheʼ words kame, meaning "death", and sotz', meaning "bat".

== Mythology ==
In the Popol Vuh, Camazotz are the bat-like spirits encountered by the Maya Hero Twins Hunahpu and Xbalanque during their trials in the underworld of Xibalba. The twins had to spend the night in the House of Bats, where they squeezed themselves into their own blowguns in order to defend themselves from the circling bats. Hunahpu stuck his head out of his blowgun to see if the sun had risen and Camazotz immediately snatched off his head and carried it to the ballcourt to be hung up as the ball to be used by the gods in their next ballgame.

== Classic Period (200–900 CE) ==
In Classic Maya iconography, the (leaf-nosed) bat, exhaling unhealthy vapours, is often depicted as a person's nahual or way-spirit bringing disease over an enemy. However, the Classic bat spirit is rarely, if ever, part of a narrative context, nor does it appear to play the role assigned to it by the Popol Vuh. Brady and Coltman dispute the earlier scholarly view that interpreted Maya bat imagery as representations of Camazotz. Maya bat imagery appears in different forms and contexts, so scholars should distinguish among those representations. The original identification was accepted without later critical review. Their analysis highlights the need to reassess the identification so that separate types of Maya bat imagery are not conflated.

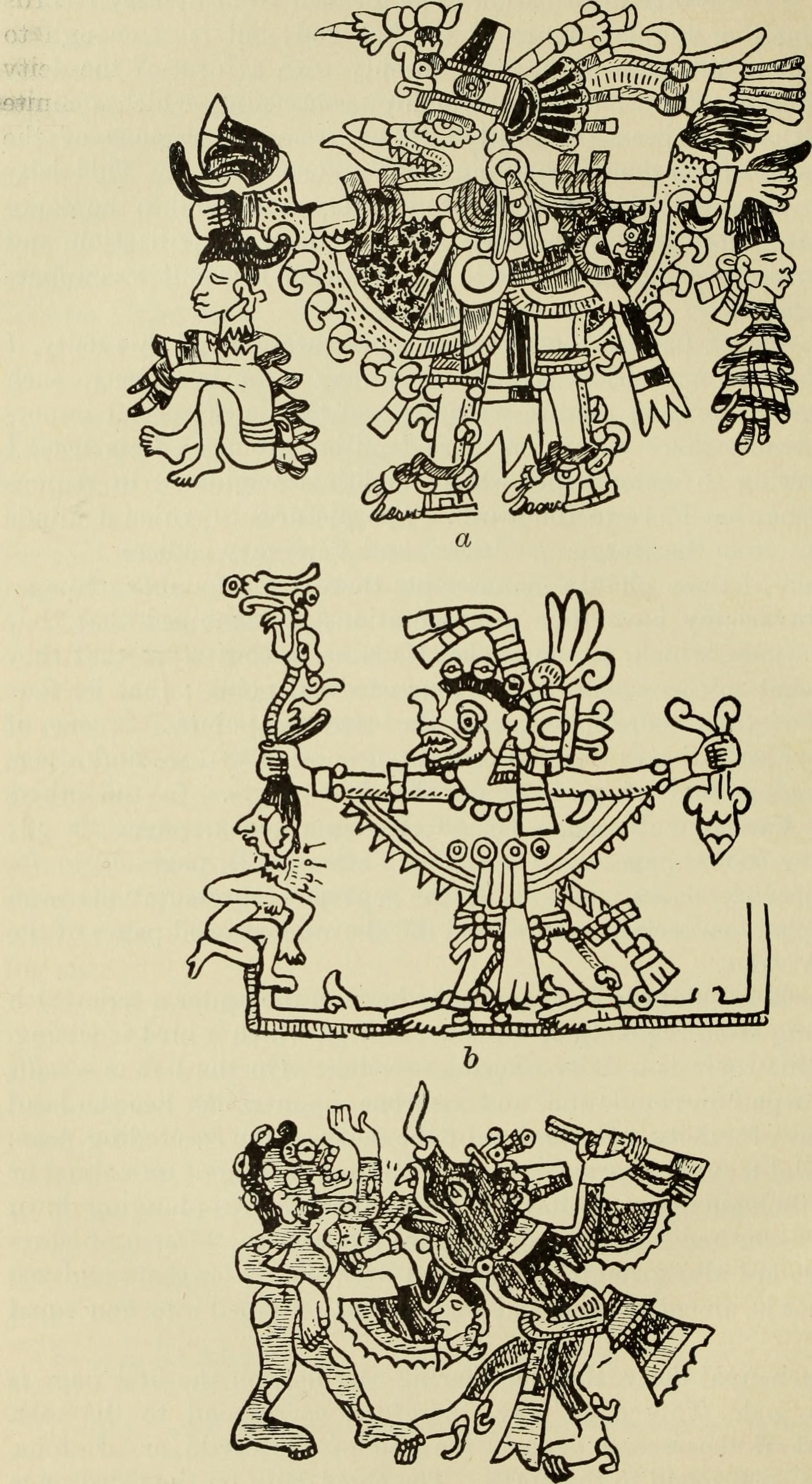

== In popular culture ==
In A Wrinkle in Time, a 1962 young adult science fantasy novel written by American author Madeleine L'Engle, Camazotz is a "dark planet" which is controlled by "IT", a disembodied brain with powerful telepathic abilities.

In the Dungeons & Dragons role-playing game, Camazotz appears in the Greyhawk campaign setting as a deity of bats and evil. In the graphic novel Kingdom Kong, Camazotz is represented as a bat-like Titan.

In the fifth and final season of the American television series Stranger Things, Holly Wheeler references the evil dimension she and Max Mayfield are stuck in as "Camazotz" due to her love of A Wrinkle in Time and its use as a prison by the series' main antagonist, Henry Creel.

== See also ==
- Leutogi – mythological Polynesian bat goddess
- The Minyades – three sisters in Greek mythology who were turned into bats and owls
- Nyctimene (mythology)

== Bibliography ==
- Brady, James E., and Jeremy D. Coltman, "Bats and the Camazotz: Correcting a Century of Mistaken Identity". Latin-American Antiquity 27(2) 2016: 227–237. JSTOR 26337239.
- Brock, Zoë (11 May 2018). Popol Vuh Part Four. LitCharts LLC.
- Christenson, Allen J. "Kʼicheʼ" (PDF). English Dictionary and Guide to Pronunciation of the Kʼicheʼ-Maya Alphabet. Foundation for the Advancement of Mesoamerican Studies, Inc. (FAMSI). Archived (PDF) from the original on 2022-10-10.
- Miller, Mary; Taube, Karl (2003) [1993]. An Illustrated Dictionary of the Gods and Symbols of Ancient Mexico and the Maya. London: Thames & Hudson. ISBN 0-500-27928-4. OCLC 28801551.
- Read, Kay Almere; González, Jason (2000). Handbook of Mesoamerican Mythology. Oxford: ABC-CLIO. ISBN 1-85109-340-0. OCLC 43879188.
- Thompson, J. Eric S. (June 1966). "Maya Hieroglyphs of the Bat as Metaphorgrams". Man. New Series. 1 (2). Royal Anthropological Institute of Great Britain and Ireland: 176–184. doi:10.2307/2796344. JSTOR 2796344.
