= Victor and Valentino =

American animated television series

- Genre: Adventure; Supernatural; Comedy
- Created by: Diego Molano
- Voices of: Diego Molano; Sean-Ryan Petersen; Laura Patalano
- Composer: Arturo Rodriguez
- Country of origin: United States
- Original language: English
- No. of seasons: 3
- No. of episodes: 119 (list of episodes)

Production
- Executive producers: Diego Molano; Jennifer Pelphrey (S1–2); Tramm Wigzell (S1–2); Rob Sorcher (S1–2); Brian A. Miller (S1–2); Sam Register (S3)
- Producers: Abraham Lopez; Jackie Buscarino (S3)
- Running time: 11 minutes
- Production company: Cartoon Network Studios

Original release
- Network: Cartoon Network
- Release: March 30, 2019 – August 26, 2022

Victor and Valentino is an American animated television series created by Diego Molano for Cartoon Network. It was produced by Cartoon Network Studios. The series follows the titular duo, a pair of half-brothers staying with their grandmother in the Mexican town of Monte Macabre, as they interact with supernatural beings that plague it, many of whom are derived from Aztec, Olmec and Mayan mythologies.

On March 30, 2019, the series premiered simultaneously in the United States and Latin America. On July 15, the series was renewed for a second season, which premiered on April 18, 2020. In February 2021, the series was renewed for a third season, which premiered on September 4, 2021. In August 2022, the series was removed from HBO Max in the U.S. Later, it was announced that the third season would be its final season, with the series finale airing on August 26, 2022.

== Synopsis ==
In the small and quiet Mexican town of Monte Macabre, a pair of total opposite half-brothers search the town for adventure and find strange and supernatural happenings with the help of their supernatural grandmother.

== Episodes ==
Season	Episodes	Originally released	
Season	Episodes	First released	Last released
Pilot		October 29, 2016	
1	39	March 30, 2019	October 26, 2019
2	39	April 18, 2020	May 29, 2021
3	41	September 4, 2021	August 26, 2022

== Production and promotion ==
The idea for the series originally started as a thesis project titled High Noon in Mexico in 2002 by Molano when he was a Maryland Institute College of Art student, where Victor and Valentino were part of a video game, along with a third brother named Vicente. In 2004, the idea took the name of "Victor, Valentino, and Vicente". Years later, he revisited the project when interning for Titmouse, where he worked after graduating from MICA, and worked as a "clean-up artist" on Superjail!.

Molano later stated his excitement in "putting the spotlight on these cultures" and in having more representation, calling the show "a baby step" in letting Latinos feel they are "part of this tapestry that’s America". Molano additionally called the series "a supernatural adventure comedy with some action elements", and stated that he loves how he can explore his "favorite subject" (mythology) by focusing on "Mesoamerican mythologies of pre-Hispanic indigenous people of the Americas".

Being Latin American folk-themed, the series' pilot episode premiered directly on the channel on October 29, 2016 (two days before their local Day of the Dead). In this pilot, Molano voiced Victor, but he planned on finding someone else. However, he decided to, ultimately, voice Victor in the main show. He later stated that he was, as a kid, just like Victor, thinking he could "do no wrong", and hoped the show would give a "good lesson for kids".

The main series itself was produced at Cartoon Network's studio in Burbank, California. Molano noted that this was where all the writing, storyboarding, pre- and post-production was done, with 36 people working on pre-production, while the main production of the animation was done by two studios based in Seoul: SMIP Co., LTD. and Digital eMation, Inc. He further noted that the visual inspiration from the show came from "Mesoamerica’s beautiful, ancient art styles". In 2019, Molano expressed some of the challenges with producing the show. This included condensing "large, epic scale, sometimes adult-themed myths/stories" into 11-minute episodes and making them "digestible content rated for kids." He was inspired to borrow from "storylines from indigenous cultures all around Mesoamerica" in an attempt to bring them into the "US cultural imaginary". The series' art directors, brothers Josh and Justin Parpan, who had worked on Gravity Falls and DuckTales respectively, added their perspective. Their work allowed the "culturally-specific world for the series" to be constructed, which they showcased on a Tumblr blog titled "Folk Art Friends – The Art of Victor and Valentino". In an interview with Cartoon Brew, they expressed the need to "do something new and different artistically", and immersed themselves in "a variety of Latin American art", with many forms of inspiration.

Following the announcement that the series would end after season three, Molano pitched the idea of a spin-off about Charlene (one of the supporting characters) titled The Lonely Haunts Club, but Cartoon Network turned it down. Concept art was drawn for the potential show. Molano has stated he is unsatisfied with the show's cliffhanger ending, and hopes to conclude the story in other media.

== Release ==
=== Broadcast ===
The series first broadcast on Cartoon Network in the U.S. and Latin America on March 30, 2019, part of the channel's 2018–2019 programming lineup. It premiered on Cartoon Network UK on 26 August 2019. It then premiered on September 23 in Italy with episodes 1x7 and 1x12 and then officially premiered in October 7 with regular episodes. It also aired on Cartoon Network India on November 1, 2019.

In October 2020, Cartoon Network commemorated Hispanic Heritage Month with an "ongoing content series that celebrates equality and individuality", which was narrated by Sean-Ryan Petersen (who voiced Valentino) and featured a "variety of powerful youth activists". In addition to this, fans were encouraged to stream Victor and Valentino episodes, along with those of other series (Note: DC Super Hero Girls and Teen Titans Go!) in Spanish on the Cartoon Network App.

On August 17, 2022, it was announced that HBO Max would be removing several series, including Victor and Valentino, in the United States. The series was also removed from Cartoon Network and HBO Max in other regions the following month. Despite this, Victor and Valentino remained airing in Poland through the channel HBO 2 on Sunday mornings until the end of February 2023.

=== Home media ===
The first 18 episodes of the series were released as a DVD titled "Victor and Valentino: Folk Art Foes", on March 2, 2021 with a total running time of about 143 minutes and language options in Spanish and English.

== Reception ==
The series has been reviewed positively. Remezcla described it as with Gravity Falls vibes and as something that aims to give Latino kids an "entertaining look at the folktales and myths that populate the American continent". Common Sense Media called the series a "comedy adventure series" based in a town which is a "setting for all kinds of supernatural oddities inspired by Latin American folklore". Other reviewers concurred. The L.A. Times called the series a "supernatural action comedy" and praised its "mix of Mexican visual motifs and Japanese anime conventions", saying it makes for "something new, yet familiar". Gizmodo described the series as the first series on Cartoon Network "starring a predominantly Hispanic cast" and praised the matter-of-fact, casual approach to "indigenous, Mesoamerican culture". The reviewer further stated that the show has the space to do worldbuilding while "letting its supernatural elements sometimes take the backseat" and called it a "clever, good-hearted show". In the same fashion, Collider stated that the animation is "a rare title that offers up something new", that it welcomes "viewers of Mesoamerican backgrounds", shares a lot with OK K.O.! Let's Be Heroes and is a series that is "fun and funny enough for kids" while offering stories "worth watching for audiences of any age". Similarly, Deadline argued that the series gave off "some fun-filled" Steven Universe and Rick and Morty vibes.
