= Epopeus (king of Lesbos) =

King of Lesbos

In classical mythology, Epopeus (/ɪˈpoʊpiːəs/; Ancient Greek: Ἐπωπεύς, romanized: Epōpeús, lit. 'all-seer') was a king of Lesbos (the large island in the Aegean Sea opposite the coast of Asia Minor) who committed incest with his daughter Nyctimene.

== Mythology ==
The name Nycteus signifies "of the night", as does Nyctimene in the following variant: according to accounts by the Roman Gaius Julius Hyginus and in Ovid's Metamorphoses (ii.590), an Epopeus was a king of Lesbos. He had sexual intercourse with his henceforth nocturnal daughter Nyctimene, whom Minerva in pity transformed into an owl, the bird that shuns the daylight.
