= Macedonian army =

Macedonian army may refer to:

- Ancient Macedonian army, the army of Macedon under Philip II and Alexander the Great
- Antigonid Macedonian army, the army of Macedon under the Antigonid dynasty
- Army of North Macedonia, the army of the modern country of North Macedonia

== See also ==
- Eastern Macedonia Army Section
- Western Macedonia Army Section
- Central Macedonia Army Section
