= Nyctimene (mythology) =

Greek mythological princess

- Princess of Lesbos
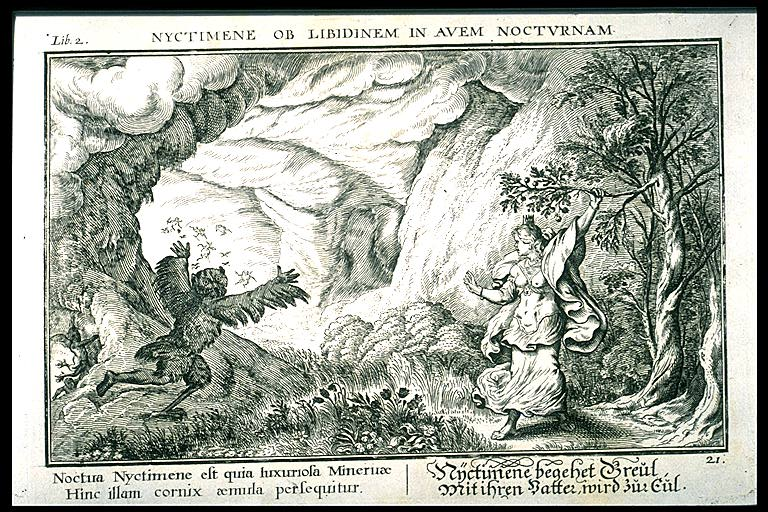
- Minerva transforms Nyctimene into an owl, (Note: The Latin distich says: "Nyctimene is Minerva's nightly (fowl) for being wanton. Thence the crow contests her." The German couplet says: "Nyctimene commits an atrocity with her father and becomes an owl.") 1641 engraving by Johann Wilhelm Baur.
- Other names: Nyctaea
- Gender: Female
- Region: Lesbos

Genealogy
- Parents: Epopeus (father)

Nyctimene (/nɪkˈtɪməni/, Ancient Greek: Νυκτιμένη, romanized: Nuktiménē, lit. 'she who stays up at night') was, according to Greek and Roman mythology, a princess and a rape victim, the daughter of Epopeus, a king of Lesbos. She was transformed into an owl by the goddess Athena, who took pity on her for her gruesome fate. The owl was one of Athena's most prominent and important symbols.

== Etymology ==
Nyctimene's name is derived from the Greek words νύξ (genitive νυκτός) 'night' and μένω 'I stay'; that is, 'she who stays up at night' (that is, the owl). Both compound words are of Proto-Indo-European origin; νύξ from the PIE root *nókʷts, and μένω from *men-.

In order for the name to translate to 'moon of the night', as suggested by another proposed etymology, it would have to be spelled Νυκτιμήνη with two etas instead of Νυκτιμένη with one.

== Mythology ==
According to Hyginus, her father Epopeus desired her and raped her. Out of shame or guilt, she fled to the forest and refused to show her face in daylight. Taking pity on her, the goddess Athena transformed her into the nocturnal owl which, in time, became a widespread symbol of the goddess.

In Ovid's Metamorphoses, the transformation was a punishment for "desecrating her father's bed" (patrium temerasse cubile), which insinuates that she had sexual intercourse with her own father, but no further explanation is given of whether she was raped, seduced or herself the seducer. In the Metamorphoses, Nyctimene's story is narrated by Corone (the crow), who also complains that her place as Minerva's sacred bird is now being usurped by Nyctimene, who is so ashamed of herself that she will not be seen by daylight.

Servius says that Nyctimene was filled with shame after realizing she had slept with her father, implying some sort of trickery to have occurred. Another scholiast says that Nyctimene was raped not by Epopeus but rather a visiting guest named Corymbus. An anonymous Greek paradoxographer writes that she fled her father, who is here named Clymenus.

A variation of her story about Nyctaea is found in pseudo-Lactantius Placidus's commentary on the Thebaid.

== Legacy ==
Her name has been given to a genus of bats and an asteroid.

== See also ==
- Myrrha
- Harpalyce
- Philomela

== Bibliography ==
- Beekes, Robert S. P. (2010). Lucien van Beek (ed.). Etymological Dictionary of Greek. Leiden Indo-European Etymological Dictionary Series. Vol. ΙΙ. Leiden, the Netherlands: Brill Publications. ISBN 978-90-04-17419-1.
- Forbes Irving, Paul M. C. (1990). Metamorphosis in Greek Myths. Oxford Classical Monographs. Oxford, New York, Toronto: Clarendon Press, Oxford University Press. ISBN 0-19-814730-9.
- Hyginus, Gaius Julius, The Myths of Hyginus. Edited and translated by Mary A. Grant, Lawrence: University of Kansas Press, 1960.
- Liddell, Henry George; Scott, Robert (1940). A Greek-English Lexicon, revised and augmented throughout by Sir Henry Stuart Jones with the assistance of Roderick McKenzie. Oxford: Clarendon Press. Online version at Perseus.tufts project.
- Maurus Servius Honoratus, In Vergilii carmina comentarii. Servii Grammatici qui feruntur in Vergilii carmina commentarii; recensuerunt Georgius Thilo et Hermannus Hagen. Georgius Thilo. Leipzig. B. G. Teubner. 1881. Online version at the Perseus Digital Library.
- Ovid (1916). Metamorphoses. Loeb Classical Library 42. Vol. I: Books 1-8. Translated by Frank Justus Miller, revised by G. P. Goold. Cambridge, MA: Harvard University Press.
- Pagès, Joan; Villagra, Nereida (May 9, 2022). Myths on the Margins of Homer: Prolegomena to the Mythographus Homericus. De Gruyter. ISBN 9783110751154.
- Westermann, Anton (1839). Paradoxographoe. London: Harvard College Library.
