= Dialogues of the Gods =

Dialogues by Lucian of Samosata

- Dialogues of the Gods (This manuscript contains ten of the dialogues of Lucianus)
- Author: Lucian of Samosata
- Translator: Various
- Language: Greek
- Genre: Satire
- Publisher: Various
- Publication date: 2nd century CE
- Publication place: Syria, Roman Empire

Dialogues of the Gods (Ancient Greek: Θεῶν Διάλογοι) are twenty-five miniature dialogues mocking the Homeric conception of the Greek gods, written in the Attic Greek dialect by the Syrian author Lucian of Samosata. The work was translated into Latin around 1518 by Livio Guidolotto (also called Guidalotto or Guidalotti), the apostolic assistant of Pope Leo X.

== The Dialogues ==
=== Dialogue I: Prometheus and Zeus ===
The Titan Prometheus begs the god Zeus to release him from the rock to which he has been chained. Zeus—still angry at the titan for his theft of fire from the gods—refuses, and tells Prometheus that, for the severity of his crimes, Prometheus's punishment is in fact too lenient. Prometheus then pleads with Zeus again and offers to reveal vital information to the god in exchange for his release. Zeus is reluctant but agrees to the bargain. Prometheus warns Zeus not to woo the beautiful nymph Thetis, as Prometheus has foreknowledge that Thetis will give birth to a mighty son who could one day overthrow his own father. Convinced and disheartened by the prediction, Zeus declares that Thetis will never be his. Zeus tells Prometheus that he will end the titan's punishment by ordering Hephaestus to release him from his rock.

=== Dialogue II: Eros and Zeus ===
Zeus is angry at the god Eros for his trickery. Eros pleads for forgiveness, arguing that he is simply the small child he appears to be, but Zeus knows that Eros is ancient and far from innocent. Zeus demands to know why Eros continues to play tricks on him, such as transforming Zeus into a satyr (Note: For Antiope.), a bull (Note: For Europa.), gold (Note: For Danae.), a swan (Note: For Leda.), and an eagle (Note: For Ganymede.), as Eros never makes women reciprocate Zeus's love, which forces Zeus to deceive them in order to seduce them. Eros justifies his transformations of Zeus by arguing that mortal women cannot withstand Zeus' true form. Zeus counters by pointing out that Hyacinthus and Branchus both loved Apollo, yet Daphne did not. Eros suggests that to be more desirable, Zeus should grow long locks, wear fashionable clothes, and participate in dances. Zeus declines and orders Eros to stop his tricks.

=== Dialogue III: Zeus and Hermes ===
Zeus asks Hermes if he has heard of the Argive princess Io, to which Hermes responds affirmatively. Zeus explains that due to Hera's jealousy, Io has been transformed into a cow and placed under the strict guard of Argus. Zeus then orders Hermes to descend to Nemea, kill Argus, and lead Io to Egypt, where he declares she will be worshiped as the goddess Isis.

=== Dialogue IV: Ganymede and Zeus ===
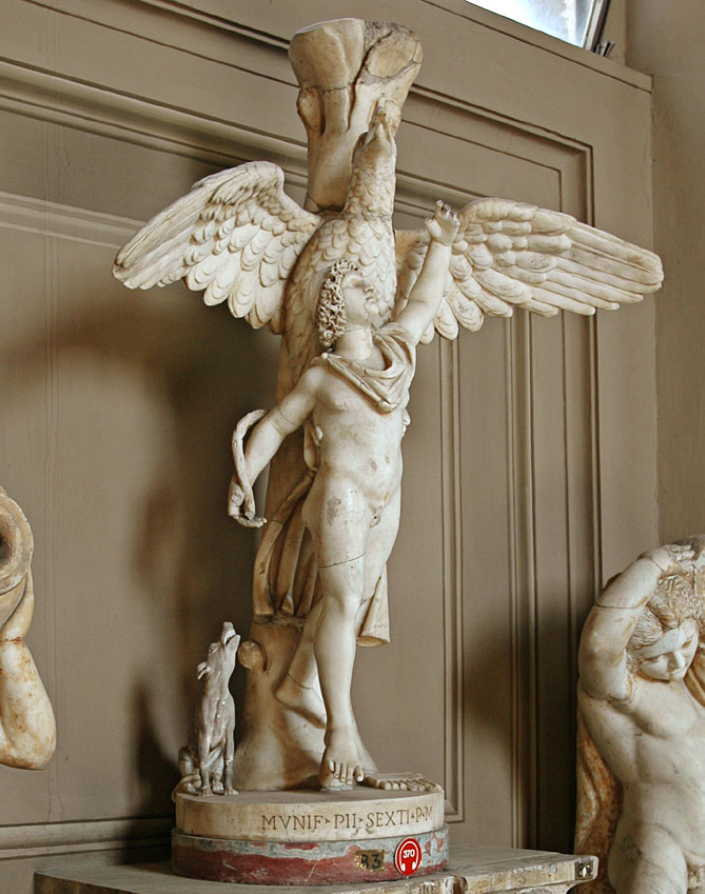
Zeus takes Ganymede in the form of an eagle

Zeus has just abducted Ganymede from earth, and the youth is distressed, asking to be returned and revealing his shock that the eagle who took him has transformed into a man. Zeus explains that he is neither an eagle nor a man, but the king of the gods. Ganymede questions whether Zeus is Pan, who is highly esteemed by his family, and expresses his belief that Zeus is merely a kidnapper. Zeus identifies himself as the god of thunder, which initially confuses Ganymede.

Ganymede protests that if he is not returned, wolves will devour the sheep he is supposed to guard. Zeus tries to reassure him, explaining that as a god, he no longer needs to concern himself with sheep. Despite this, Ganymede laments his fate and the life he is leaving behind as a mortal. Zeus tells him that his new role will be to serve nectar to the gods and spend the night with him. Ganymede seems unaware of the implications of sharing a bed with Zeus, recalling that as a child he would sleep with his father, who often complained about Ganymede kicking him and would send him to his mother's bed instead. Zeus, unbothered by this, assures Ganymede that he will be kissed anyway and instructs Hermes to offer Ganymede some ambrosia to make him immortal, and to explain how to serve the ambrosia properly.

=== Dialogue V: Hera and Zeus (I) ===
Hera complains to Zeus that ever since he kidnapped Ganymede from Mount Ida, he has been neglecting her. Zeus is taken aback by this, and Hera explains that it is unbecoming for the king of the gods to forsake his wife for mortal women. She is especially aggrieved by Ganymede, whom Zeus has brought to Olympus and appointed as his cup-bearer, effectively replacing Hebe and Hephaestus. (Note: Hephaestus is mentioned serving the gods nectar in the Iliad.) Hera is further upset by Zeus's frequent public displays of affection towards Ganymede, including kissing him at every opportunity. Zeus responds that if he allowed Hera to kiss Ganymede as well, she would understand why he prefers those kisses over even nectar. Their argument continues with Hera accusing Zeus of dishonouring her, while Zeus defends his decision to keep Ganymede on Olympus. He tells her that her jealousy only intensifies his affection and instructs Ganymede to give him two kisses, instead of just one, when he serves him.

=== Dialogue VI: Hera and Zeus (II) ===
Hera asks Zeus for his opinion on their guest, Ixion, to which Zeus responds that Ixion is worthy of the company of the gods. Hera, however, believes he is unworthy. When pressed by Zeus, she reluctantly admits that Ixion has been making inappropriate advances towards her, which she has tried to ignore. Zeus is enraged by the mortal's audacity and attributes it to the effects of love, a topic that further irritates Hera because it reminds her that Zeus once slept with Ixion's wife, resulting in the birth of Pirithous. Zeus proposes that, instead of expelling Ixion, they should send him a cloud resembling Hera. Hera objects, fearing that Ixion will boast of having slept with the queen of the gods. Zeus reassures her that if Ixion brags, they will cast him into Tartarus.

=== Dialogue VII: Hephaestus and Apollo ===
Hephaestus asks Apollo if he has seen how beautiful and charming Maia's baby, Hermes, is. Apollo is not impressed, pointing out that the baby has already stolen Poseidon's trident, Ares' sword, and his own bow and arrows. Although Hephaestus is skeptical, Apollo suggests he check if he is missing anything. Hephaestus then discovers that his pincers are gone. Apollo advises him to search in the baby's cradle, noting that Hermes is highly skilled in thievery and has also pilfered Aphrodite's girdle and Zeus' sceptre. Apollo even mentions that Hermes has stolen items from the Underworld, where he leads the souls with a staff—a staff Hephaestus admits he gave to Hermes. (Note: Compare the Homeric Hymn to Hermes, where the caduceus is a gift to Hermes from Apollo himself.)

=== Dialogue VIII: Hephaestus and Zeus ===
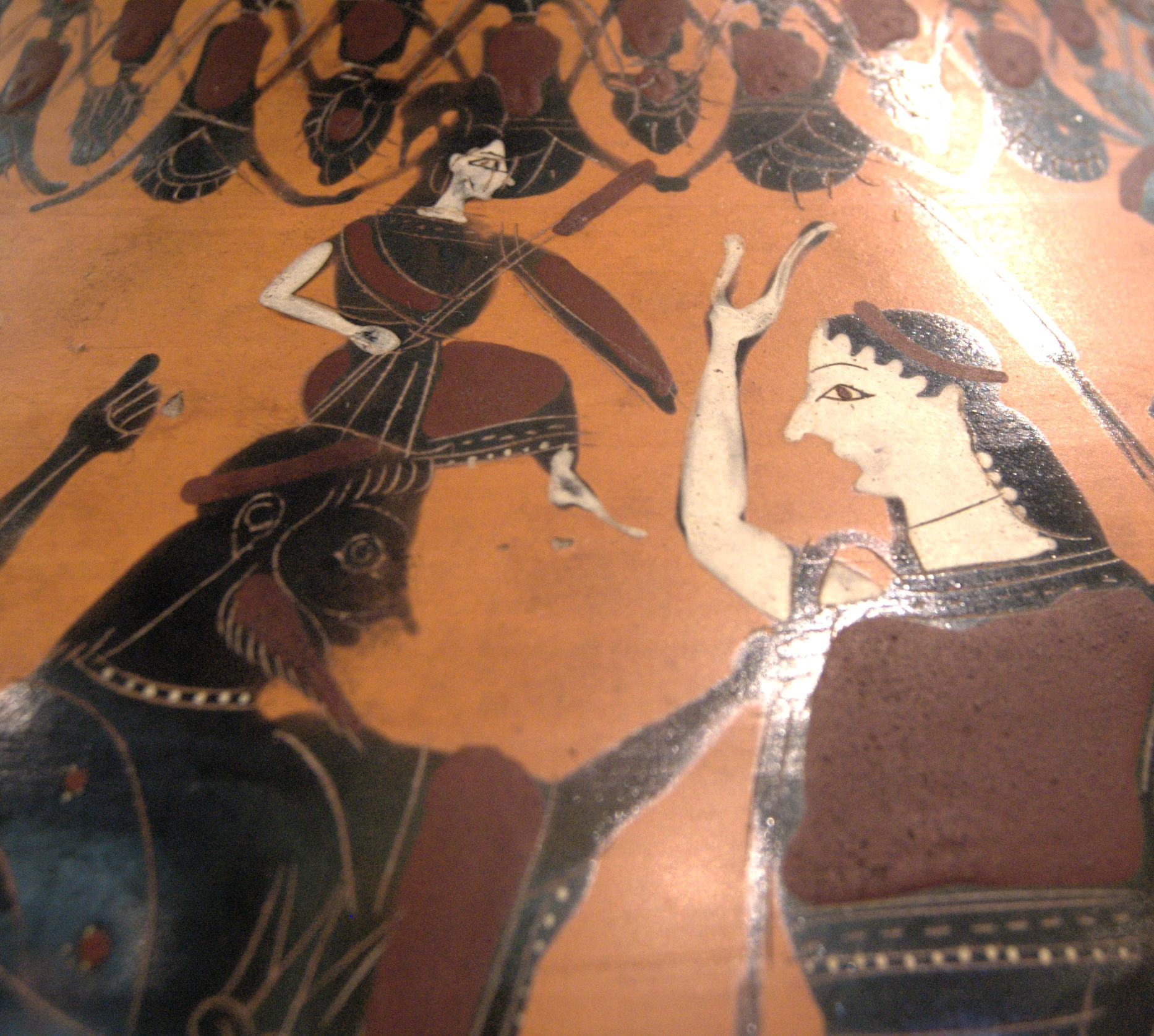
Athena is born from Zeus's forehead as he grasps the clothing of Eileithyia on the right; black-figured amphora, 550–525 BC, Louvre.

Zeus orders a bewildered Hephaestus to strike him on the head with his hammer, insisting he do it with all his strength, or risk Zeus's anger—a threat he has made before. (Note: Zeus once threw Hephaestus off Mount Olympus.) Hephaestus reluctantly agrees but warns that this task will not be as clean and bloodless as Eileithyia's work, the goddess of childbirth. Zeus dismisses his concerns, and Hephaestus strikes him. As Zeus's skull cracks open, the goddess Athena emerges fully grown from his head. Hephaestus, captivated by her beauty, asks for her hand in marriage, but Zeus declines, stating that Athena will remain a virgin for all time.

=== Dialogue IX: Poseidon and Hermes ===
Poseidon asks Hermes where he can find Zeus, but Hermes, looking uncomfortable, indicates that now might not be the best time. Poseidon interprets this as meaning Zeus is with either Hera or Ganymede, but Hermes denies both. Under further questioning from Poseidon, Hermes reveals that Zeus has just given birth, which shocks Poseidon, who didn't realize Zeus could become pregnant. Hermes clarifies that the fetus wasn't in Zeus's belly but rather in his thigh. He explains that Zeus had impregnated Semele, but Hera convinced Semele to request that Zeus "visit her complete with thunder and lightning. He agreed, and came with his thunderbolt too; the roof caught fire." As a result, Semele was incinerated, but Zeus saved the unborn child by placing it in his thigh for further development. Hermes adds that the child has been entrusted to nymphs for care, and he is now heading to provide Zeus with the proper post-childbirth care.

=== Dialogue X: Hermes and Helios ===
Hermes goes to find Helios (the Sun) to deliver Zeus's order that he should not rise for three days. Helios, concerned that he may have done something wrong and is being punished, is reassured by Hermes that this is not the case. Hermes explains that Zeus is in love with Alcmene, the wife of Amphitryon, and wants to spend time with her to father a great hero, Heracles, who will be mightier than any other. Helios agrees but expresses concern about the impact of Zeus's actions on the world, and unfavorably compares Zeus to Cronus, who never abandoned Rhea for the sake of a mortal woman. (Note: Helios is mistaken here; Cronus had a son, Chiron, by Philyra.) Hermes advises Helios to be quiet to avoid trouble if anyone overhears and then proceeds to deliver the same message to Selene (the Moon) and Hypnos (Sleep).

=== Dialogue XI: Aphrodite and Selene ===
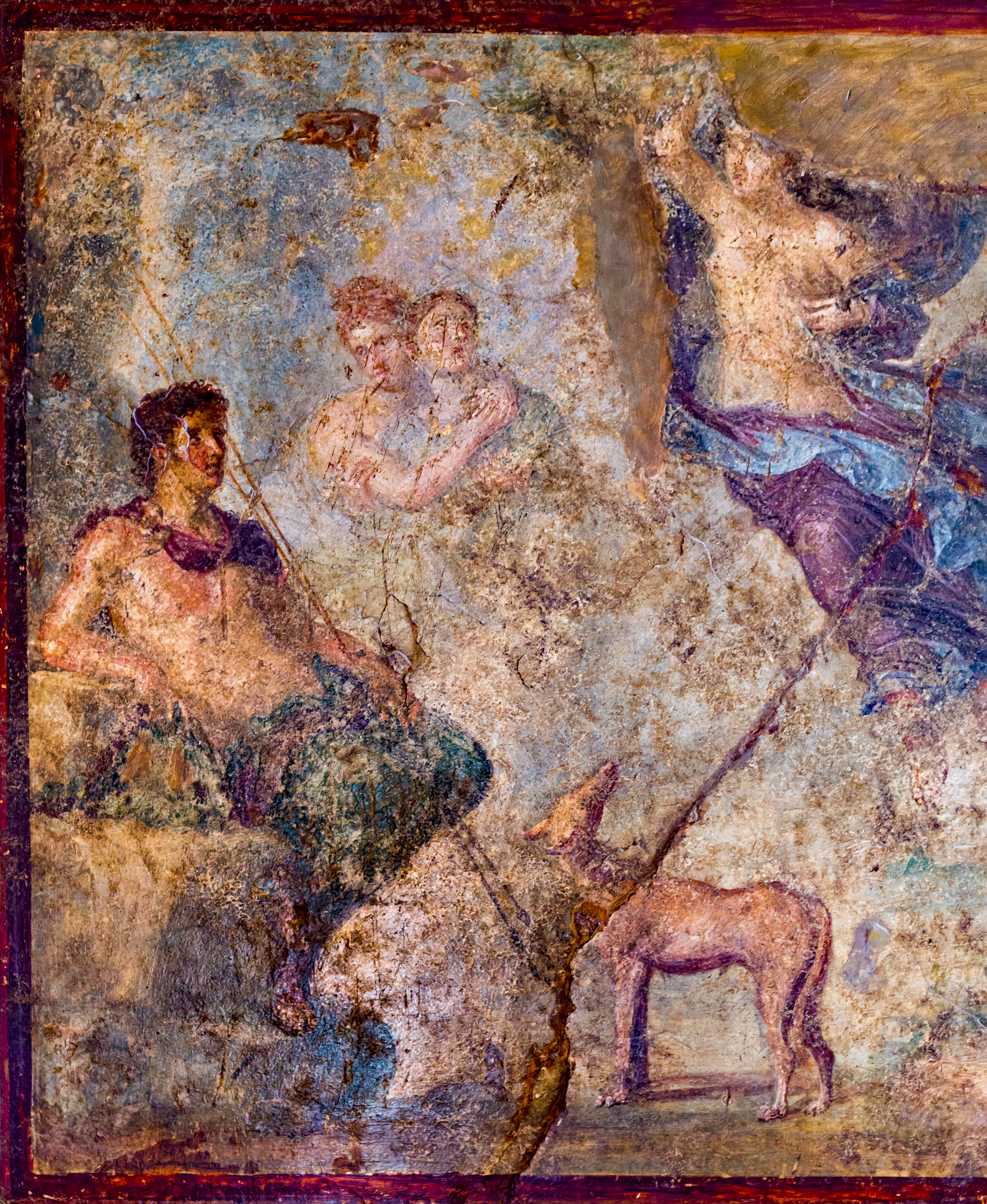
Selene and Endymion, antique fresco from Pompeii.

Aphrodite asks Selene if the rumors are true that she often abandons the sky to meet her mortal lover Endymion. Selene replies that she is not to blame for this, but rather Aphrodite's son, Eros. Aphrodite agrees, noting that Eros torments everyone—such as Rhea, whom he made fall in love with Attis, and herself, only for Eros to make Persephone fall for her lover Adonis as well, forcing the two goddesses to share him. Selene explains that she finds comfort in her passion because Endymion is a very handsome man. She describes how she visits him every night while he sleeps in a cave, tiptoeing to avoid making any noise that might wake him.

=== Dialogue XII: Aphrodite and Eros (I) ===
Aphrodite scolds her son Eros for the chaos he causes. He makes Zeus assume countless forms, causes Selene to leave the sky to meet her lover Endymion, (Note: Selene abandons the sky to be with Endymion.) and makes Helios stay in bed with Clymene longer, causing him to forget to rise. He even has Rhea, the mother of the gods, under his influence, making her fear what might happen if she orders the Corybantes or her lions to attack him out of frustration. Eros reassures her that he can handle Rhea and argues that he should not be blamed for these disruptions. He even asks if Aphrodite would prefer not being in love with Ares. Aphrodite warns him to heed her words carefully.

=== Dialogue XIII: Zeus, Asclepius and Heracles ===
Asclepius and Heracles are arguing over who deserves the higher position at the table. Each asserts that they are more deserving than the other. Heracles claims that his numerous achievements and defeated foes entitle him to the better place. In contrast, Asclepius argues that he has healed Heracles' burn wounds and never committed the heinous acts that Heracles did, such as killing his family (Note: Heracles' wife Megara and their children.) or serving as a slave to Queen Omphale. As the argument escalates, Heracles threatens violence, but Zeus intervenes and instructs Heracles to concede the better seat to Asclepius, noting that Asclepius died first.

=== Dialogue XIV: Hermes and Apollo (I) ===
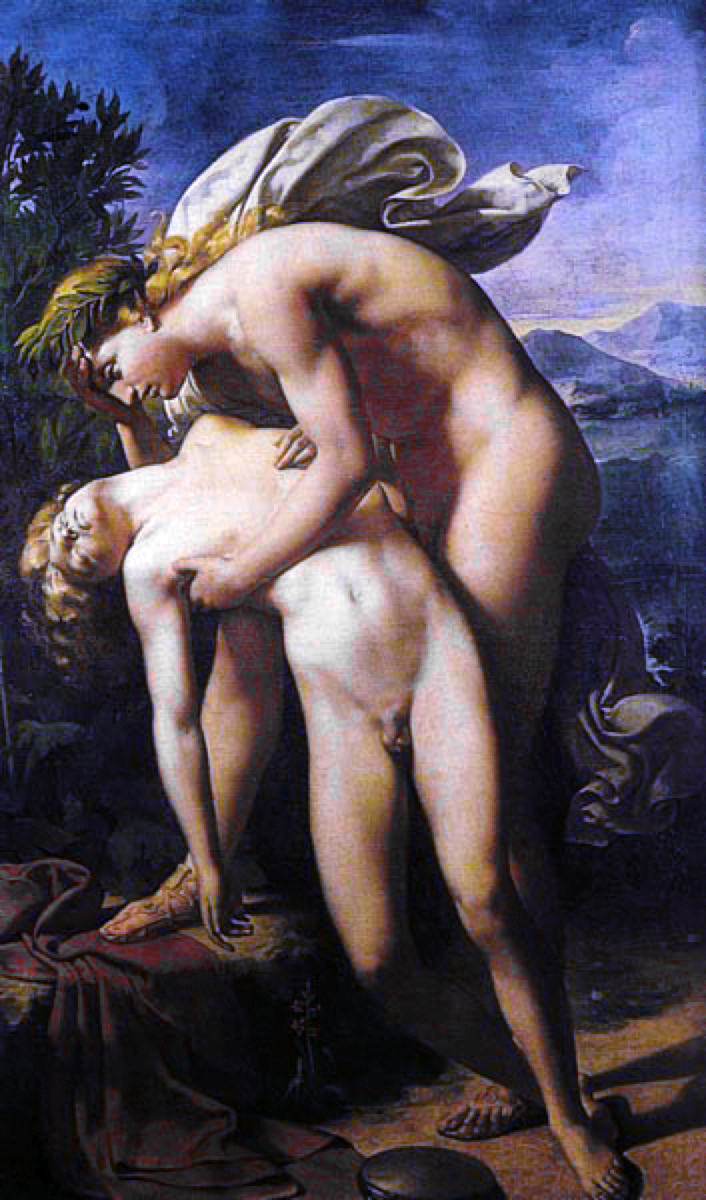
The Death of Hyacinthus, oil painting by Méry-Joseph Blondel.

Hermes asks Apollo why he appears so despondent. Apollo replies that it is due to his unfortunate love life and his mourning over the death of his lover, Hyacinthus, the son of Oebalus. Hermes inquires if Hyacinthus is indeed dead, to which Apollo confirms. When Hermes asks how it happened, Apollo takes full responsibility, which makes Hermes think Apollo might be losing his sanity. Apollo explains that they were playing a game of discus when Zephyrus, the west wind god who was also in love with Hyacinthus, redirected the discus, causing it to strike Hyacinthus in the head and kill him. This tragic accident is the reason for Apollo's sorrow. Hermes, however, tells Apollo that his grief is irrational; he should have anticipated the mortality of Hyacinthus and the possibility of his eventual death.

=== Dialogue XV: Hermes and Apollo (II) ===
Hermes expresses disbelief that the physically impaired Hephaestus has managed to marry two of the most beautiful goddesses, Aphrodite and Grace. Apollo speculates that it must be due to luck, but questions how they can bear to kiss him, given his perpetual dirtiness and sweat. Hermes concurs, finding it puzzling that despite their own handsomeness, they are still single. Apollo reflects on his own lack of success in love, noting that he had deep feelings for both Daphne and Hyacinthus, but lost them. He is also curious about how Aphrodite and Grace manage not to be envious of each other. Hermes explains that Aphrodite resides on Olympus while Grace is in Lemnos. Additionally, Aphrodite is actually in love with Ares, not Hephaestus, though Hephaestus is unaware of this.

=== Dialogue XVI: Hera and Leto ===
Hera sarcastically congratulates Leto on having given birth to Apollo and Artemis, the two children of Zeus. Leto responds by suggesting that not everyone is fortunate enough to have Hephaestus for a son. Hera defends Hephaestus by highlighting his craftsmanship but insults Artemis and Apollo, calling Artemis a cannibal and belittling Apollo's domains. She even claims that her own children are not truly superior to Niobe's. Leto retorts that Hera is likely envious of the attention and praise her children receive. Hera mocks this response, citing Apollo's brutal treatment of Marsyas for challenging him in a music contest and Artemis' killing of Actaeon for accidentally seeing her naked. Leto accuses Hera of using her status as Zeus’s wife to insult others and warns that Hera will be miserable again once Zeus abandons her for another mortal woman.

=== Dialogue XVII: Apollo and Hermes (I) ===
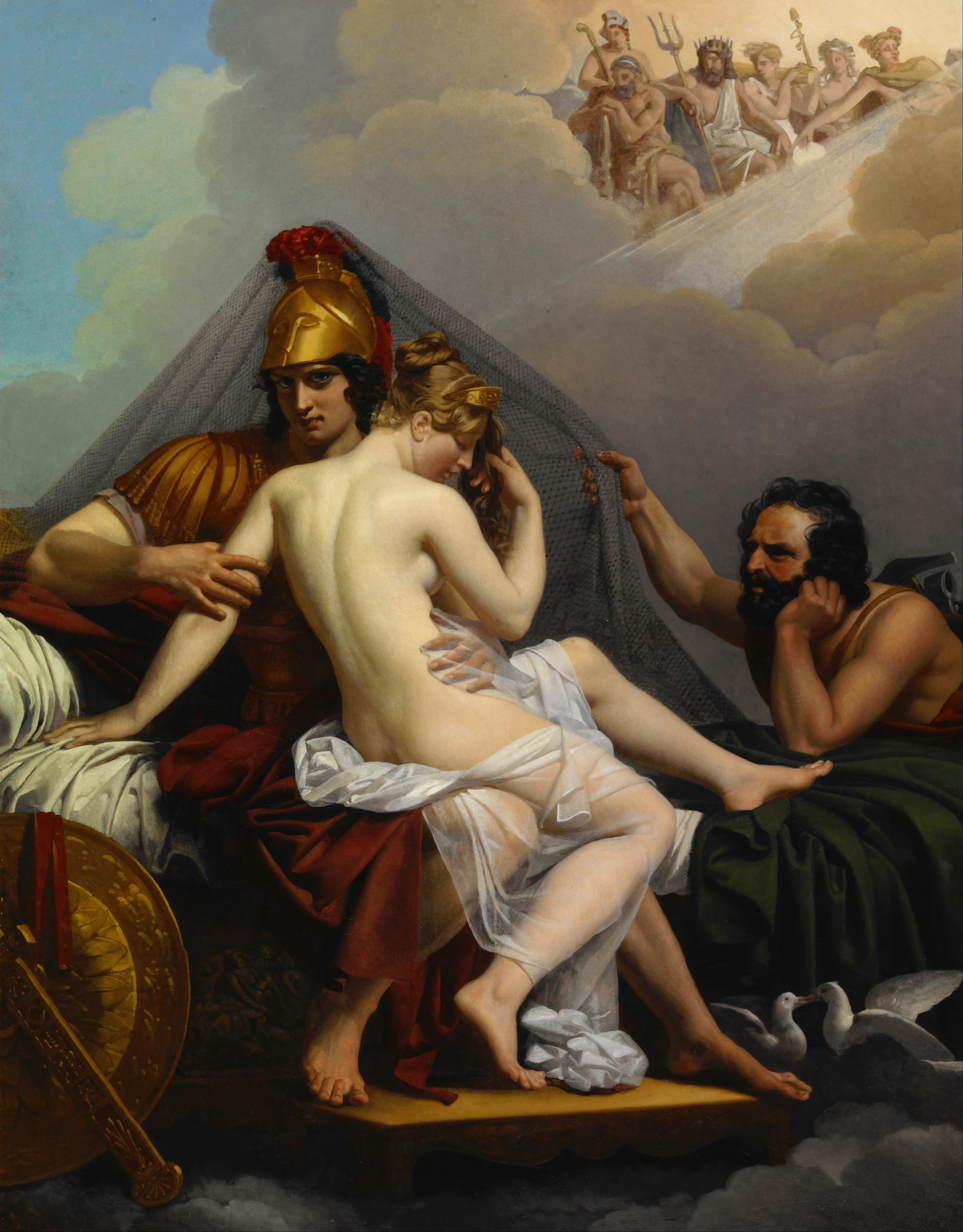
Mars and Venus Surprised by Vulcan by Alexandre Charles Guillemot (1827)

Apollo notices Hermes laughing and asks him what is so amusing. Hermes replies that he has just witnessed something incredibly ridiculous: Hephaestus has caught Aphrodite and Ares in bed together, naked. Apollo asks how this happened, and Hermes explains that Hephaestus, who had long been trying to catch them, set a thin net over the bed. Ares and Aphrodite, unaware of the trap, lay down, and Helios alerted Hephaestus, who then summoned the other gods to witness the embarrassing scene. Apollo wonders why Hephaestus isn't ashamed to expose his failed marriage in this way, but Hermes remarks that he would willingly be in the same predicament with Aphrodite himself and invites Apollo to come and see. (Note: This episode is narrated by Homer in the Odyssey.)

=== Dialogue XVIII: Hera and Zeus (III) ===
Hera tells Zeus that she would be embarrassed if she had a son as feminine and prone to drunkenness as Dionysus, who spends his time with the Maenads, indulging in wine and revelry. Zeus defends his son, citing his many accomplishments: leading a campaign in India, gaining control over Lydia, commanding the Thracians and the people of Tmolus, all while adorned with ivy, wielding his thyrsus, and engaging in frenzied dances. He wonders what more Dionysus could achieve if he were sober, considering his successes while intoxicated. Hera is irritated by Zeus praising Dionysus for discovering wine, especially given the tragic fate of Icarius, who was killed by his drinking companions. (Note: Icarius, after being given wine by Dionysus, invited several men to drink with him. When they passed out, other villagers, unaware of wine's effects and believing Icarius had poisoned them, killed him.) Zeus argues that Dionysus is not to blame for this, but rather people's inability to enjoy things in moderation. He also suggests that Hera's harsh words about Dionysus are motivated by jealousy over Semele.

=== Dialogue XIX: Aphrodite and Eros (II) ===
Aphrodite asks Eros why, despite his many victories over gods like Zeus, Apollo, Poseidon, and even herself, he never uses his tricks on Athena. Eros replies that Athena frightens him, which leads Aphrodite to wonder why Ares does not scare him. Eros explains that Ares is welcoming to him, while Athena is consistently unapproachable. Additionally, Eros refrains from approaching the Muses out of respect, although several of the Muses have had lovers and children. (Note: Several Muses however, such as Calliope and Clio, were known to have lovers and offspring.) As for Artemis, Eros cannot catch her because she is always running through the mountains, and she is already in love with her own passion for hunting. Aphrodite observes that, unlike Artemis, her brother Apollo has been struck by Eros many times.

=== Dialogue XX: Ares and Hermes ===
Ares asks Hermes if he has heard Zeus's recent boast that he is mightier than all the other gods combined. (Note: See Homer's Iliad.) Ares acknowledges that Zeus is indeed stronger than any individual god, but he questions whether Zeus could defeat all of them at once. Hermes advises Ares to keep his voice down to avoid trouble, but Ares, trusting Hermes to be discreet, continues. He mocks Zeus's claim by recalling how Zeus was rendered helpless when Hera, Poseidon, and Athena rebelled against him and bound him until Thetis intervened and had Briareos release him. Hermes once again urges Ares to be quiet to prevent both of them from getting into trouble.

=== Dialogue XXI: Pan and Hermes ===
Pan greets Hermes, calling him his father. Hermes is surprised and asks how he could be the father of the goat-legged god Pan. Pan explains that Hermes might not recall, but he once approached a maiden from Arcadia in the form of a goat. Pan's mother, Penelope of Sparta, daughter of Icarius, gave birth to Pan as a result. Hence, Pan was born with a goat's lower half. Hermes confirms Pan's story but feels embarrassed to be acknowledged as his father. He requests that Pan not address him as his father in the presence of the other gods, fearing they might mock him.

=== Dialogue XXII: Apollo and Dionysus ===
Apollo marvels at how different the three sons of Aphrodite are: Eros is a stunningly beautiful bowman, Hermaphroditus is a blend of male and female traits, and Priapus is strikingly unattractive. (Note: Priapus is characterized by a permanent erection.) Dionysus suggests that the differences are not due to Aphrodite herself, but rather the various gods who fathered these sons. He also notes that even siblings born to the same parents can be quite different, using himself and his sister Artemis as examples. Apollo counters that he and Artemis are both archers, but Dionysus argues that while he is a healer, Artemis punishes those who offend her. Dionysus then recounts a humorous incident involving Priapus; when Dionysus visited Priapus, the latter made unsuccessful advances toward him while he was asleep. Apollo finds this amusing and attributes it to Dionysus' good looks. Dionysus points out that Apollo is also very attractive and might attract Priapus as well. Apollo replies that if that were the case, he would have to rely on his bow as well as his hair.

=== Dialogue XXIII: Hermes and Maia ===
Hermes complains to his mother, Maia, that he is the most miserable of the gods. While the other deities spend their days partying and drinking freely on Olympus, he is burdened with so many duties that he has no time for himself. He is particularly resentful that the sons of mortal women like Alcmene and Semele—Heracles and Dionysus—get to enjoy the best of immortal life, while he, the son of a goddess, must constantly serve Zeus's needs. Maia tells him to stop complaining and reminds him that he should fulfill his duties to his father without further grumbling.

=== Dialogue XXIV: Zeus and Helios ===
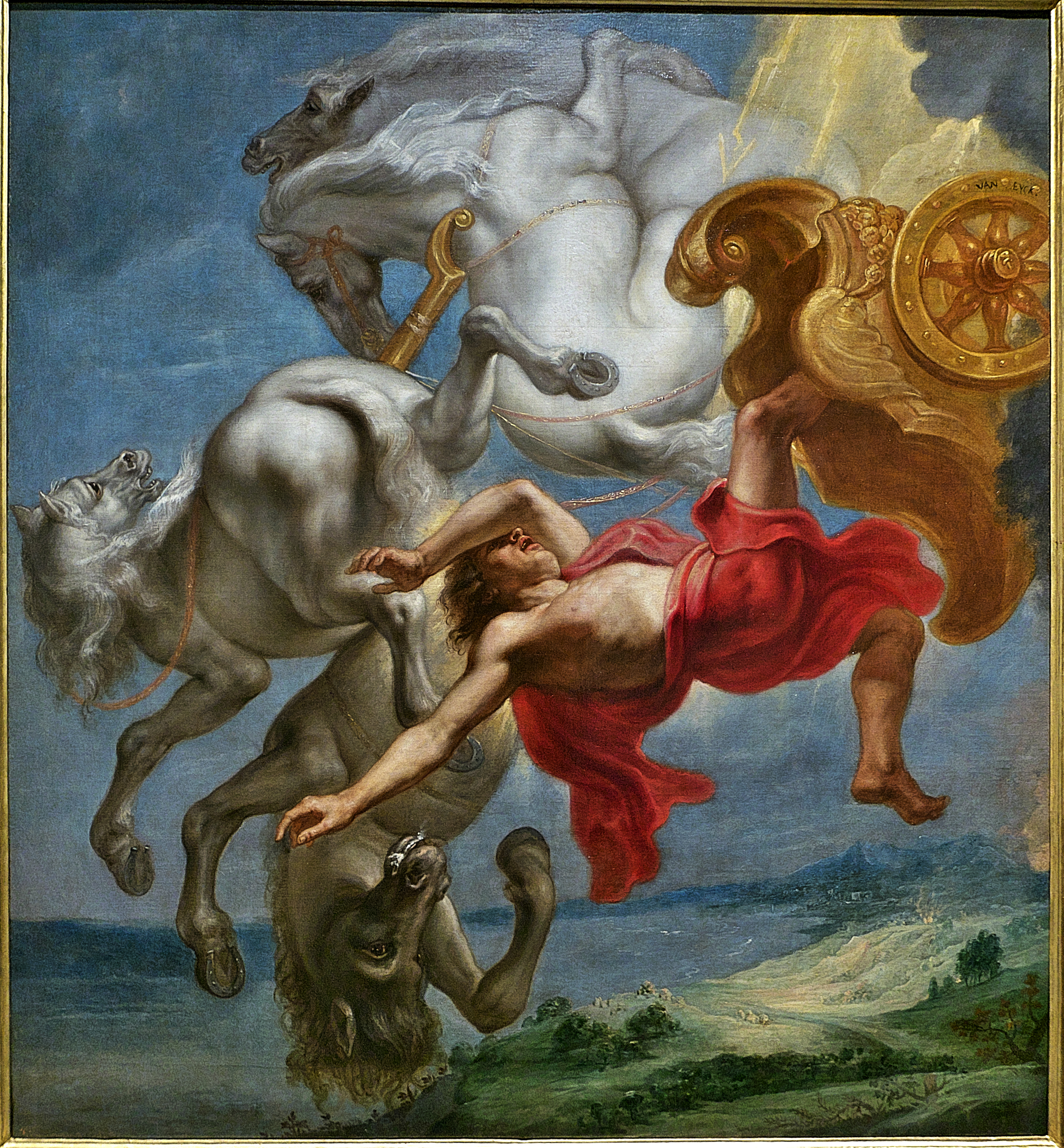
The fall of Phaethon

Zeus angrily chides Helios for entrusting the reins of his chariot to a youth—Phaethon, his own son—whose incompetence led to disastrous consequences. Due to Phaethon's mishandling, the earth was scorched and then frozen; the world would have been destroyed entirely if Zeus hadn't intervened with a lightning bolt. Helios admits the errors but excuses himself by saying he was swayed by his son's constant pleas and did not foresee the extent of the destruction. Zeus is not convinced, arguing that Helios should have known that the horses required a strong, experienced hand and would run wild under an inexperienced driver. Helios acknowledges this but explains that he gave in to both Phaethon's and his wife Clymene's entreaties. He theorizes that Phaethon, frightened by driving too high, dropped the reins, leading to the chaos. Helios pleads with Zeus not to be too harsh, pointing out that Phaethon has already been punished and he himself is deeply grieving. Zeus, however, believes that these consequences are insufficient given the scale of the catastrophe. He warns Helios never to send another charioteer in his place, or he will strike him with his thunderbolts.

=== Dialogue XXV: Apollo and Hermes (II) ===
Apollo and Hermes are discussing the twin brothers Castor and Pollux. Apollo confesses that he cannot tell the twins apart, while Hermes can. Hermes explains that Castor and Pollux alternate between Olympus and the Underworld, desiring to stay together forever. Apollo considers this arrangement unfair, feeling that the twins contribute less compared to his own significant roles in providing prophecies and how Artemis serves as a midwife. Hermes responds that the two assist Poseidon as protectors of sailors. Apollo remains unimpressed by this justification.

== Judgement of Paris ==
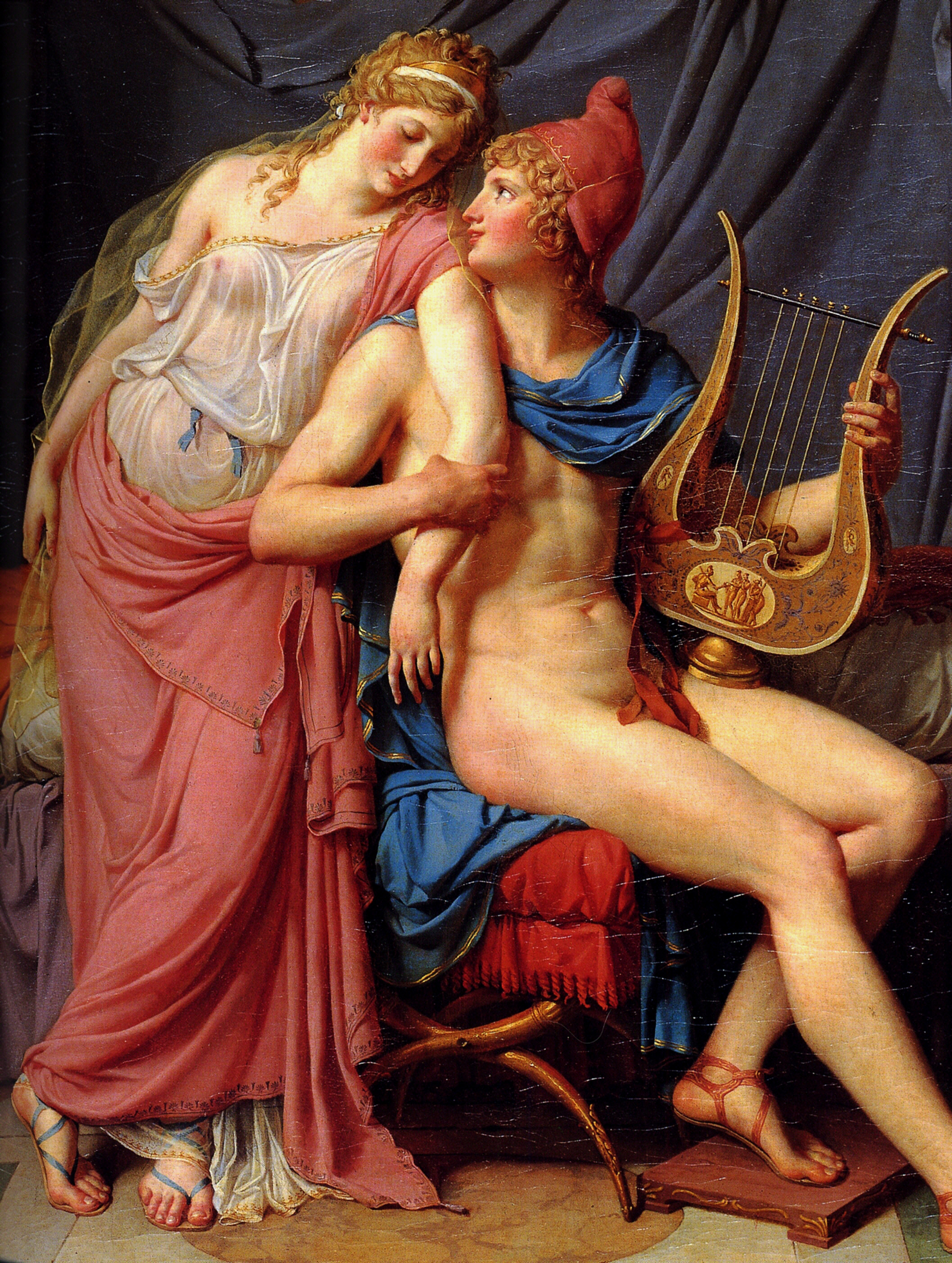
The Love of Helen and Paris by Jacques-Louis David (oil on canvas, 1788, Louvre, Paris)

Another work by Lucian, titled The Judgement of Paris, deals with the mythological story of Paris choosing the most beautiful goddess among Hera, Athena, and Aphrodite. Initially, the three goddesses requested Zeus to be the judge of their beauty. Zeus, unable to choose among them because he loves all three equally, decides that Paris, a mortal, would be a more suitable judge. He tasks Hermes with leading the goddesses to Phrygia, where Paris is located. While Aphrodite suggests that they should appoint Momus as the judge, believing he would find no fault in her, Hera prefers Zeus' choice. The goddesses then debate whether Paris being married should affect his judgment. Eventually, they and Hermes arrive in Phrygia.

Upon finding Paris, the goddesses initially disagree on who should approach him first. Hermes takes the lead and introduces them to Paris. He hands Paris the golden apple inscribed "for the fairest." Paris protests that, as a mortal, he cannot judge their divine beauty and is conflicted about making a choice. Hermes reminds him that this is Zeus' command. Paris begins to examine the three goddesses. Athena requests that Aphrodite remove her charm-enhancing girdle, while Aphrodite counters that Athena should remove her intimidating helmet. Both goddesses comply, revealing their true forms, which leaves Paris captivated by their beauty. Paris asks to inspect them further, prompting Athena and Aphrodite to withdraw to disrobe. (Note: So they can take off their clothes.) With Athena and Aphrodite absent, Hera offers Paris the kingship of Asia if he chooses her. Paris, uninterested, asks Hera to step aside so he can admire Athena. Athena then promises to make him the greatest warrior and conqueror. Paris, not interested in warfare, tells her to don her robe and helmet again.

Finally, Aphrodite reappears, allowing Paris to take his time examining her and promising him the hand of Helen, daughter of Zeus and Leda, in marriage. Despite never having heard of Helen before and knowing she is already married to Menelaus, Paris chooses Aphrodite's offer and awards her the apple.

== Gods appearing ==
- Aphrodite
- Apollo
- Ares
- Asclepius
- Dionysus
- Eros
- Ganymede
- Helios
- Hephaestus
- Hera
- Heracles
- Hermes
- Leto
- Maia
- Pan
- Poseidon
- Prometheus
- Selene
- Zeus
