= Theorizing About Myth =

Book in religious studies

- Author: Robert A. Segal
- Language: English
- Subject: Mythology
- Publisher: University of Massachusetts Press
- Publication date: 1999
- Publication place: United States
- Pages: 216
- ISBN: 978-1-55849-191-5
- Dewey Decimal: 291.1/3/01
- LC Class: BL311.S43 1999

Theorizing About Myth is a 1999 book by the University of Aberdeen religious studies scholar Robert A. Segal that offers an alternative interpretation of the Adonis myth. In chapter seven, "Adonis: A Greek Eternal Child", he puts forth his theory of Adonis, not as a vegetation god but as an archetype of the eternal child, the Jungian puer.

== Summary ==
In Segal's interpretation, based on the work of Carl Jung, Adonis lives as "a psychological infant, ultimately, as a fetus". He lives under the spell of the Great Mother archetype and can only live through her. His ego is weak and he seeks to remain surrendered to her.

He can put down no roots of his own. He is unable to take on the institutions of work and family which connects one to the community because he is retarded psychologically. He is childlike and a childish puer won't be tied down. He avoids commitment and craves excitement. He is sexually promiscuous because he can never find his fantasy mate. Ultimately he is attached to the archetype of The Great Mother. All women are either manifestations of the mother or unworthy and inferior.

Segal mentions Elvis Presley as the "consummate mamma's boy who lived the last twenty years as a recluse in a womblike, infantile world in which all of his wishes were immediately satisfied yet who deemed himself entirely normal, in fact 'all-American'".

In Segal's view, the puer is the opposite archetype of the hero: the hero succeeds where the puer fails, finds a wife and a job, takes risks for those things to which he is committed. The puer commits to nothing so he risks nothing. He has no independent ego so he cannot lose it.

Turning to the myth itself, Segal notes that immediately after his birth when Adonis emerges from the tree, Aphrodite puts him into a chest thereby undoing his birth so that she can possess him. Next, Persephone opens the chest, sees him and wants him for herself. Each gets him for four months of the year Zeus grants him freedom for the remaining four months. However, Adonis immediately gives up his freedom to Aphrodite, placing himself in the custody of the mother archetypes.

Segal says that a Jungian interpretation of the myth could face the same difficulty as the Frazerian interpretation which is that it must take into account the fact that he eventually dies permanently. Says Segal, "Where a normal child needs to be born only once to liberate himself from the mother, Adonis, as puer, continually returns to the mother and so must be born again and again. His final death is simply his permanent rather temporary return to her".

Segal goes on to explain how Adonis speaks of a distinctively Greek society in which the goal of young men was to become active, participating citizens. Adonis is the archetype of what not to become.
