= Adonis =

Greek god of beauty and desire

- Mortal lover of Aphrodite
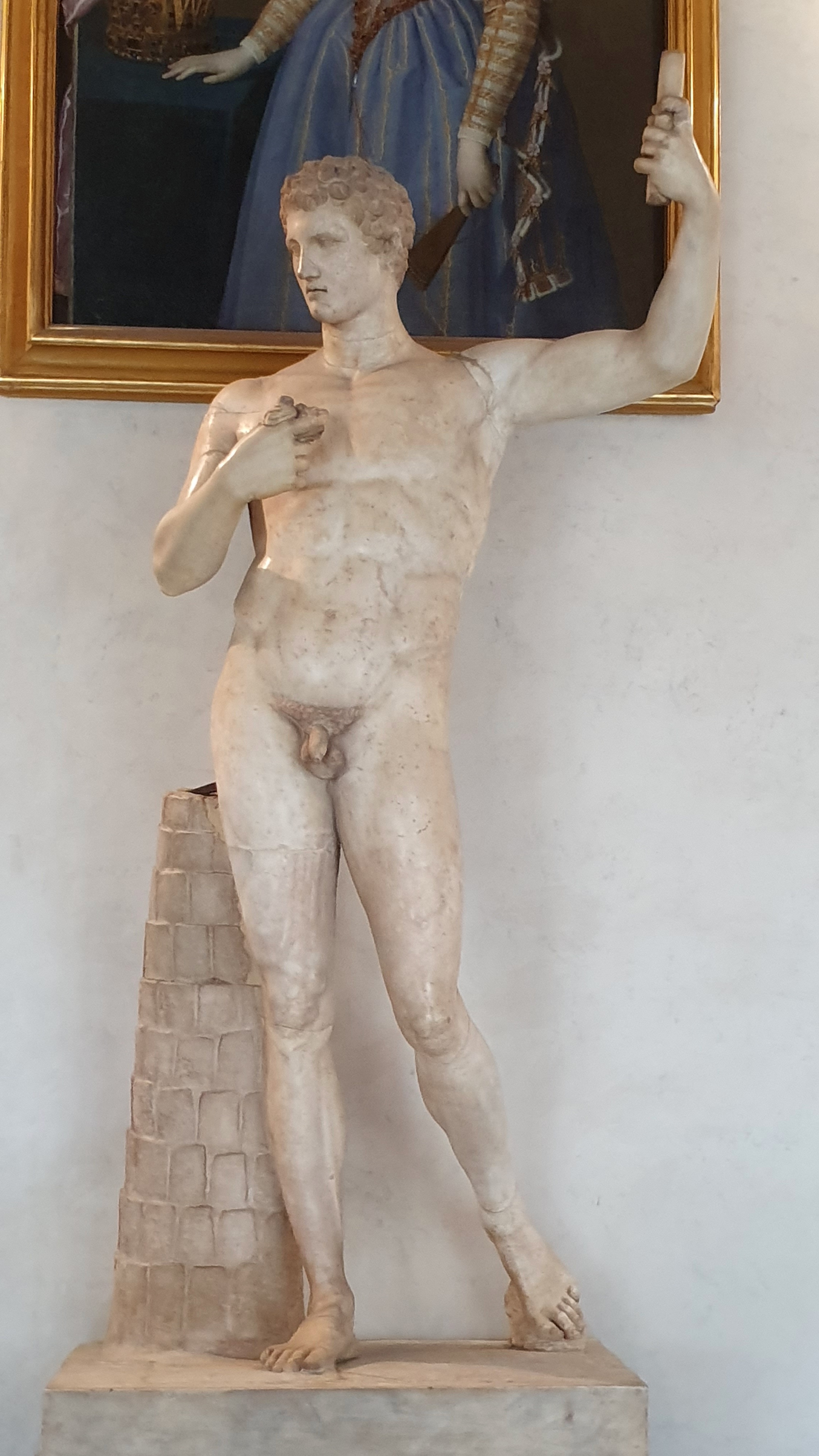
- The Adonis Uffizi, made from pentelic marble, 2nd century BC, currently held in the Uffizi Gallery, Florence, Italy
- Symbol: anemones, as well as lettuce, fennel, and other fast-growing plants
- Festivals: Adonia

Genealogy
- Parents: Phoenix and Alphesiboea (by Hesiod); Theias and Myrrha (by Antoninus Liberalis); Cinyras and Myrrha (by Ovid)
- Consort: Aphrodite
- Children: Beroe, Golgos, Taleus, Zariadres

In Greek mythology, Adonis (Ancient Greek: Ἄδωνις, romanized: Adōnis; Phoenician: 𐤀𐤃𐤍, romanized: ʾAdón, ['a.dɔː.nis]) was the mortal lover of the goddesses Aphrodite and Persephone. He was considered to be the ideal of male beauty in classical antiquity.

According to mythical tradition, Adonis was gored by a wild boar during a hunting trip and died in Aphrodite's arms as she wept; his blood mingled with her tears and became the anemone flower. The Adonia festival commemorated his tragic death, celebrated by women every year in midsummer. During this festival, Greek women would plant "gardens of Adonis", small pots containing fast-growing plants, which they would set on top of their houses in the hot sun. The plants would sprout but soon wither and die. Then, the women would mourn the death of Adonis, tearing their clothes and beating their breasts in a public display of grief.

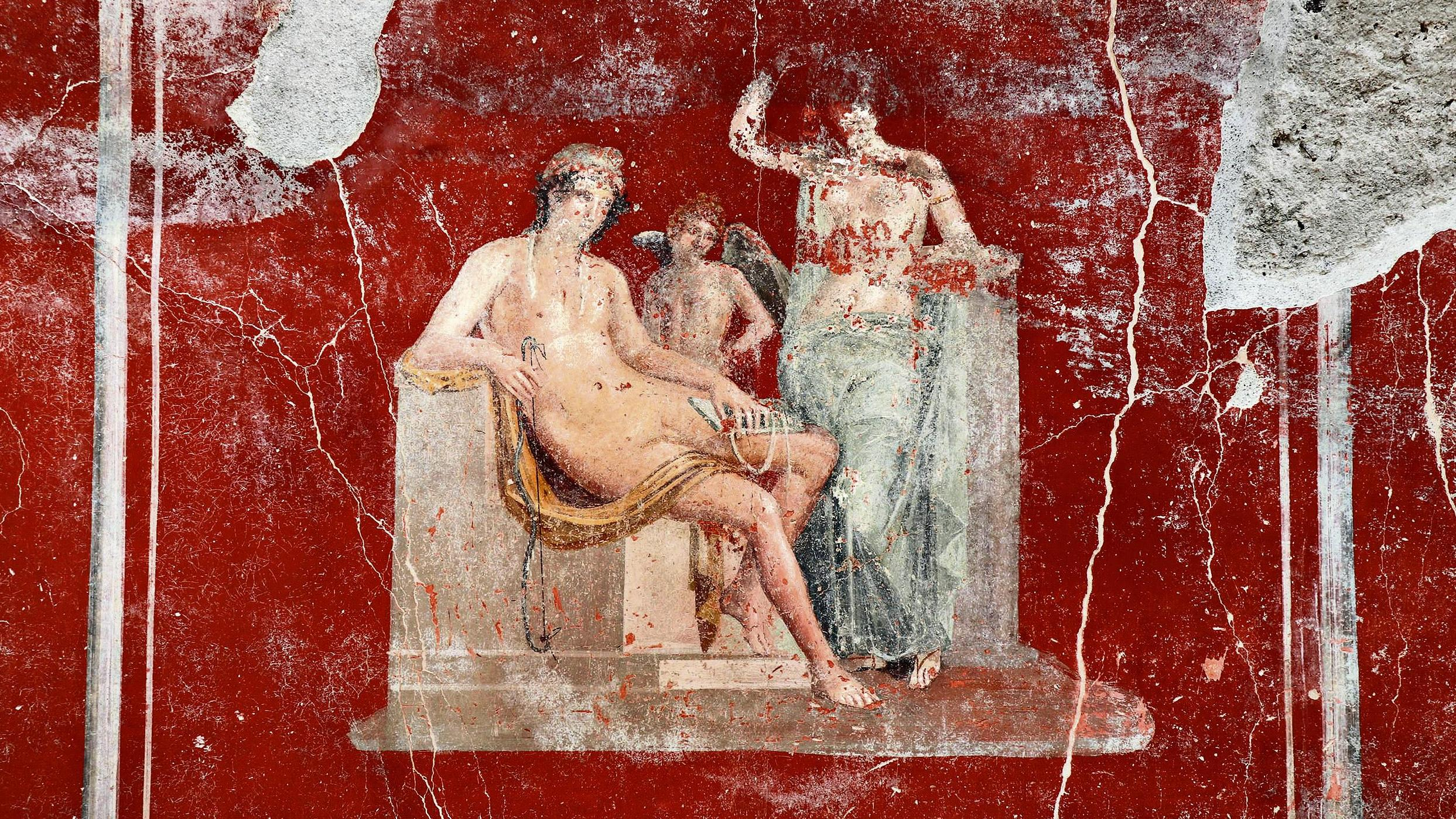
Antique fresco in Pompeii depicting Adonis, Cupid, and Venus

The Greeks considered Adonis's cult to be of Near Eastern origin. Adonis's name comes from a Canaanite word meaning "lord" and most modern scholars consider the story of Aphrodite and Adonis to be derived from a Levantine version of the earlier Mesopotamian myth of Inanna (Ishtar) and Dumuzid (Tammuz).

In late 19th and early 20th century scholarship of religion, Adonis was widely seen as a prime example of the archetypal dying-and-rising god. His name is often applied in modern times to handsome youths, of whom he is considered the archetype.

== Cult ==
=== Origin ===
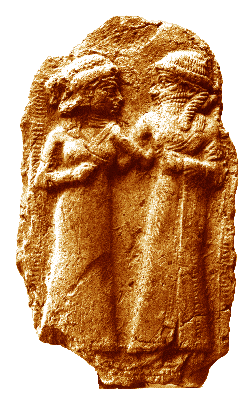
An ancient Sumerian depiction of the marriage of Inanna and Dumuzid

The worship of Aphrodite and Adonis is probably a Greek continuation of the ancient Sumerian worship of Inanna and Dumuzid. The Greek name Ἄδωνις (Ádōnis), Ancient Greek pronunciation: [ádɔːnis]) is derived from the Canaanite word 𐤀𐤃𐤍 (ʼadōn), meaning "lord".

This word is related to Adonai (Hebrew: אֲדֹנָי), one of the titles used to refer to the God of the Hebrew Bible and still used in Judaism to the present day. The Syrian name for Adonis is Gauas.

The cult of Inanna and Dumuzid may have been introduced to the Kingdom of Judah during the reign of King Manasseh. Ezekiel 8 (Ezekiel 8:14) mentions Adonis under his earlier East Semitic name Tammuz and describes a group of women mourning Tammuz's death while sitting near the north gate of the Temple in Jerusalem.

The earliest known Greek reference to Adonis comes from a fragment of a poem by the poet Sappho of Lesbos (c. 630 – c. 570 BC), in which a chorus of young girls asks Aphrodite what they can do to mourn Adonis's death. Aphrodite replies that they must beat their breasts and tear their tunics. The cult of Adonis has also been described as corresponding to the cult of the Phoenician god Baal. As Walter Burkert explains:

Women sit by the gate weeping for Tammuz, or they offer incense to Baal on roof-tops and plant pleasant plants. These are the very features of the Adonis legend: which is celebrated on flat roof-tops on which sherds sown with quickly germinating green salading are placed, Adonis gardens ... the climax is loud lamentation for the dead god.

The exact date when the worship of Adonis became integrated into Greek culture is still disputed. Walter Burkert questions whether Adonis had not from the very beginning come to Greece along with Aphrodite. "In Greece," Burkert concludes, "the special function of the Adonis legend is as an opportunity for the unbridled expression of emotion in the strictly circumscribed life of women, in contrast to the rigid order of polis and family with the official women's festivals in honour of Demeter." The significant influence of Near Eastern culture on early Greek religion in general, and on the cult of Aphrodite in particular, is now widely recognised as dating to a period of orientalisation during the eighth century BC, when archaic Greece was on the fringes of the Neo-Assyrian Empire.

In Cyprus, the cult of Adonis gradually superseded that of Cinyras. Atallah (1966) suggests that the later Hellenistic myth of Adonis represents the conflation of two independent traditions.

=== Festival of Adonia ===
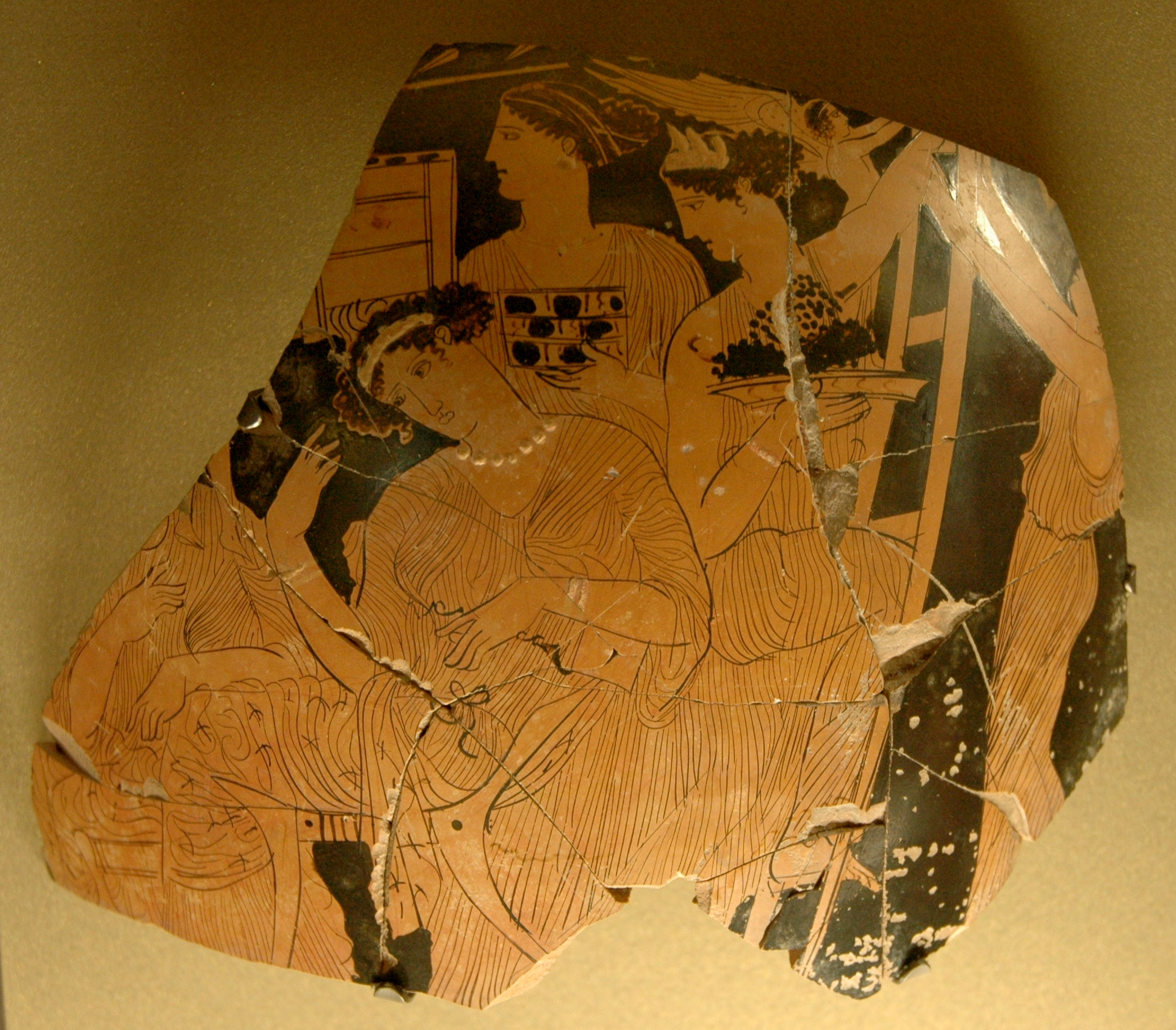
Fragment of an Attic red-figure wedding vase (c. 430–420 BC), showing women climbing ladders up to the roofs of their houses carrying "gardens of Adonis"

The worship of Adonis is associated with the festival of Adonia, which was celebrated by Greek women every year in midsummer. The festival, which was evidently already celebrated in Lesbos by Sappho's time in the seventh century BC, seems to have first become popular in Athens in the mid-fifth century BC. At the start of the festival, the women would plant a "garden of Adonis", a small garden planted inside a small basket or a shallow piece of broken pottery containing a variety of quick-growing plants, such as lettuce and fennel, or even quick-sprouting grains, such as wheat and barley. The women would then climb ladders to the roofs of their houses, where they would place the gardens out under the heat of the summer sun. The plants would sprout in the sunlight, but wither quickly in the heat. While they waited for the plants to first sprout and then wither, the women would burn incense to Adonis. Once the plants had withered, the women would mourn and lament loudly over the death of Adonis, tearing their clothes and beating their breasts in a public display of grief. The women would lay a statuette of Adonis out on a bier and then carry it to the sea along with all the withered plants as a funeral procession. The festival concluded with the women throwing the effigy of Adonis and the withered plants out to sea.

== Mythology ==
=== Birth ===
While Sappho does not describe the myth of Adonis, later sources flesh out the details. According to the retelling of the story found in the poem Metamorphoses by the Roman poet Ovid (43 BC – AD 17/18), Adonis was the son of Myrrha, who was cursed by Aphrodite with insatiable lust for her own father, King Cinyras of Cyprus, after Myrrha's mother Cenchreis bragged that her daughter was more beautiful than the goddess. It was to her nurse that, with much reluctance, Myrrha revealed her shameful passion. Sometime later, during a festival in honour of Demeter, the nurse found Cinyras half-passed out with wine and Myrrha's mother nowhere near him. Thus, she spoke to him of a girl who truly loved him and desired to sleep with him, giving her a fictitious name and simply describing her as Myrrha's age. Cinyras agreed, and the nurse was quick to bring Myrrha to him. Myrrha left her father's room impregnated. After several couplings, Cinyras discovered his lover's identity and drew his sword to kill her; driven out after becoming pregnant, Myrrha was changed into a myrrh tree but still gave birth to Adonis. According to classicist William F. Hansen, the story of how Adonis was conceived falls in line with the conventional ideas about sex and gender that were prevalent in the classical world, since the Greeks and Romans believed that women, such as Adonis's mother Myrrha, were less capable of controlling their primal wants and passions than men.

=== Aphrodite and Persephone ===
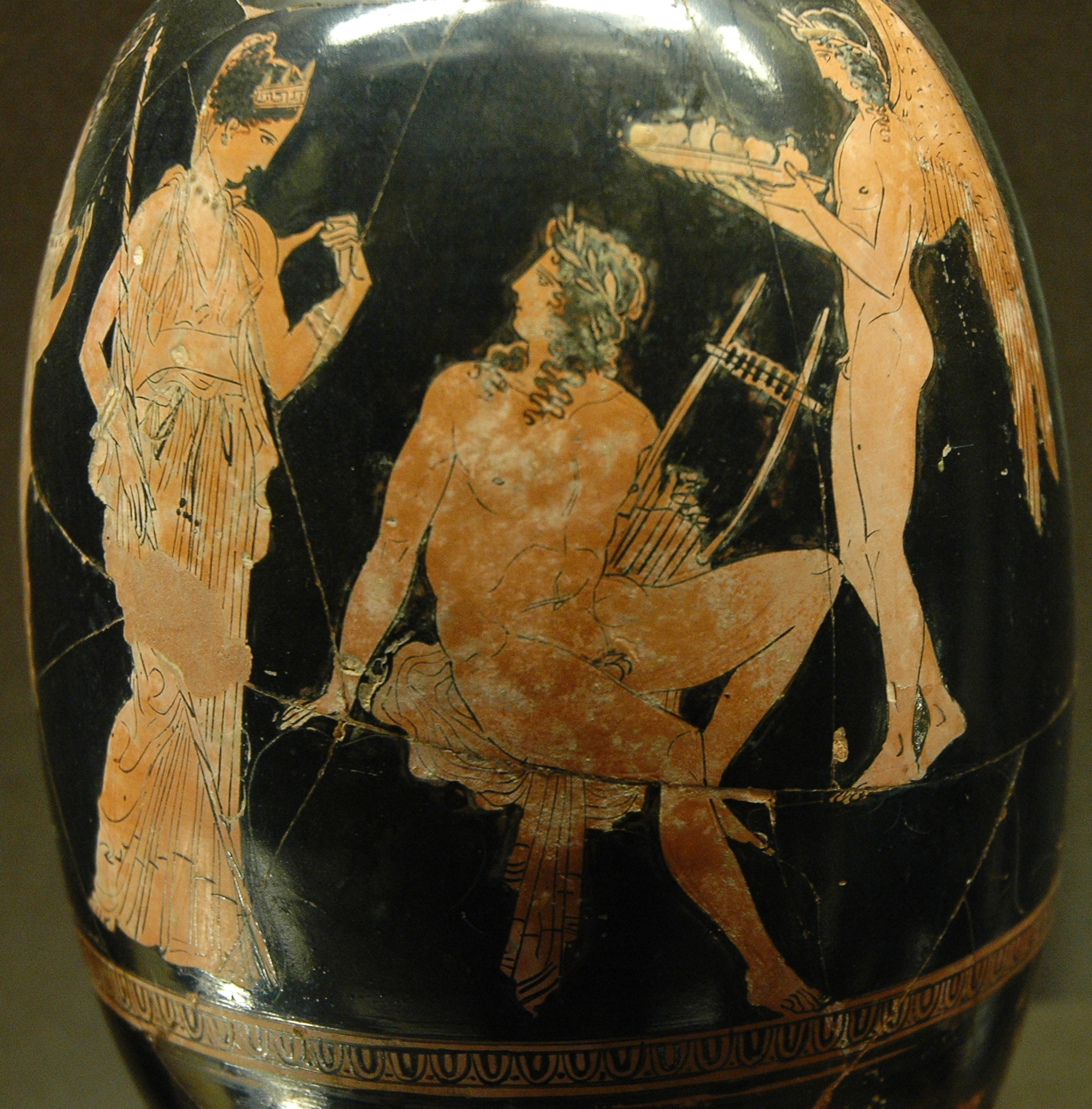
Attic red-figure aryballos painting by Aison (c. 410 BC) showing Adonis consorting with Aphrodite

Aphrodite found the baby, and took him to the underworld to be fostered by Persephone. She returned for him once he was grown and discovered him to be strikingly handsome. However, Persephone too found Adonis to be exceedingly handsome and wanted to keep Adonis for she too fell in love with him; Zeus settled the dispute by decreeing that Adonis would spend one third of the year with Aphrodite, one third with Persephone, and one third with whomever he chose. Adonis chose Aphrodite, and they remained constantly together. Another version states that both goddesses got to keep him for half the year each at the suggestion of the Muse Calliope. Thus was Adonis's life divided between Aphrodite and Persephone, one goddess who loved him beneath the earth, the other above it. In his comical work Dialogues of the Gods, the satirical author Lucian features Aphrodite in several dialogues, in one of which she complains to the moon goddess Selene that Eros made Persephone fall in love with Adonis and now she has to share him with her.

=== Death ===
Then, one day, while Adonis was out hunting, he was wounded by a wild boar and bled to death in Aphrodite's arms. In different versions of the story, the boar was either sent by Ares, who was jealous that Aphrodite was spending so much time with Adonis, by Artemis, who wanted revenge against Aphrodite for having killed her devoted follower Hippolytus, or by Apollo, to punish Aphrodite for blinding his son Erymanthus. The story also provides an etiology for Aphrodite's associations with certain flowers. Reportedly, as she mourned Adonis's death, she caused anemones to grow wherever his blood fell, and declared a festival on the anniversary of his death. In one late account, his blood transformed into roses instead.

According to another version of the myth, the Muses became angry with Aphrodite because she caused many of them to fall in love and bear children. In revenge, they sang a beautiful hunting song that excited Adonis and lured him into the hunt, where he was killed by a boar. In a different version, Ares either transformed himself into the boar or attacked and killed Adonis as he charged at it.

In a very different version from the standard, surviving in the works of fifth century AD grammarian Servius and perhaps originating from the island of Cyprus, Adonis was made to fall in love with a mortal girl named Erinoma by Aphrodite herself at the command of Hera. Erinoma, a virgin girl favoured by Artemis and Athena, rejected his advances, so Adonis crept stealthily into her bedroom and raped her. Adonis then fled and went into a cave to hide from Zeus, who also loved Erinoma and would surely avenge the violence done against her. Hermes, however, lured him out with a trick, and Ares wounded him mortally in the form of a boar. Adonis died, but was eventually restored to life after Aphrodite begged Zeus. Erinoma bore him a son named Taleus.

=== Other loves ===
Adonis was also said to have been loved by other gods such as Apollo, Heracles and Dionysus. He was described as androgynous, for he acted like a man in his affections for Aphrodite but as a woman for Apollo. "Androgynous" here means that Adonis took on a receptive role during sex with Apollo, which was interpreted in classical Greece to be the feminine position.

Heracles's love of Adonis is mentioned in passing by Ptolemy Hephaestion. The text states that due to his love of Adonis, Aphrodite taught Nessus the centaur the trap to ensnare him.

Another tradition states that Dionysus, the Greek god of wine and madness, carried off Adonis.

=== Other versions ===
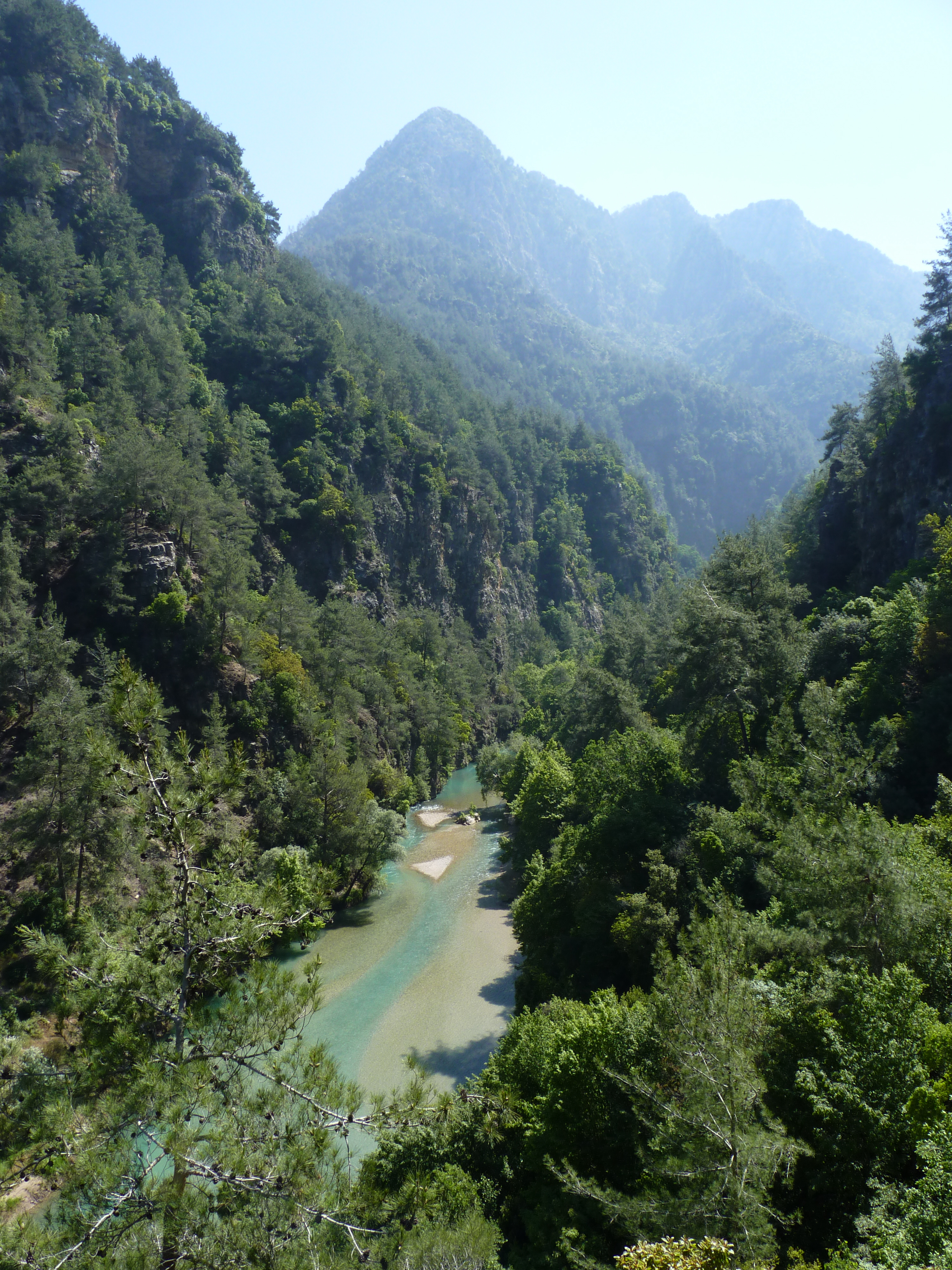
The Adonis River (now known as the Abraham River) in Lebanon was said to run red with blood each year during the festival of Adonis.

In Idyll 15 by the early third-century BC Greek bucolic poet Theocritus, Adonis is described as still an adolescent with down on his cheeks at the time of his love affair with Aphrodite, in contrast to Ovid's Metamorphoses, in which he is portrayed as a fully mature man. Pseudo-Apollodorus (Bibliotheke, 3.182) describes Adonis as the son of Metharme and Cinyras of Paphos on Cyprus. According to Pseudo-Apollodorus's Bibliotheke, Hesiod, in an unknown work that does not survive, made of him the son of Phoenix and the otherwise unidentified Alphesiboea.

In one version of the story, Aphrodite injured herself on a thorn from a rose bush and the rose, which had previously been white, was stained red by her blood. In another version, an anemone flower grew on the spot where Adonis died, and a red rose where Aphrodite's tears fell. The third-century BC poet Euphorion of Chalcis remarked in his Hyacinth that "Only Cocytus washed the wounds of Adonis". According to Lucian's De Dea Syria, each year during the festival of Adonis, the Adonis River in Lebanon (now known as the Abraham River) ran red with blood.

== In post-classical literature culture ==
The medieval French poet Jean de Meun retells the story of Adonis in his additions to the Roman de la Rose, written around 1275. De Muen moralises the story, using it as an example of how men should heed the warnings of the women they love. In Pierre de Ronsard's poem "Adonis" (1563), Venus laments that Adonis did not heed her warning, but ultimately blames herself for his death, declaring, "In need my counsel failed you." In the same poem, however, Venus quickly finds another shepherd as her lover, representing the widespread medieval belief in the fickleness and mutability of women.

The story of Venus and Adonis from Ovid's Metamorphoses was tremendously influential during the Elizabethan era. In Edmund Spenser's epic poem The Faerie Queene (1590), tapestries depicting the story of Adonis decorate the walls of Castle Joyous. Later in the poem, Venus takes the character Amoretta to raise her in the "Garden of Adonis". Ovid's portrayal of Venus's desperate love for Adonis became the inspiration for many literary portrayals in Elizabethan literature of both male and female courtship.

William Shakespeare's erotic narrative poem Venus and Adonis (1593), a retelling of the courtship of Aphrodite and Adonis from Ovid's Metamorphoses, was the most popular of all his works published within his own lifetime. Six editions of it were published before Shakespeare's death (more than any of his other works) and it enjoyed particularly strong popularity among young adults. In 1605, Richard Barnfield lauded it, declaring that the poem had placed Shakespeare's name "in fames immortall Booke". Despite this, the poem has received a mixed reception from modern critics. Samuel Taylor Coleridge defended it, but Samuel Butler complained that it bored him, and C. S. Lewis described an attempted reading of it as "suffocating".

The story of Adonis was the inspiration for the Italian poet Giambattista Marino to write his mythological epic L'Adone (1623), which outsold Shakespeare's First Folio. Shakespeare's homoerotic descriptions of Adonis's masculine and Venus's beauty inspired the French novelist and playwright Rachilde (Marguerite Vallette-Eymery) to write her erotic novel Monsieur Vénus (1884), about a noblewoman named Raoule de Vénérande who sexually pursues a young, effeminate man named Jacques who works in a flower shop. Jacques is ultimately shot and killed in a duel, thus following the model of Adonis's tragic death.

=== As a dying and rising god ===
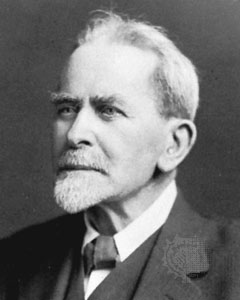
Sir James George Frazer, the anthropologist most directly responsible for promoting the concept of a "dying and rising god" archetype

The late nineteenth-century Scottish anthropologist Sir James George Frazer wrote extensively about Adonis in his monumental study of comparative religion, The Golden Bough (the first edition of which was published in 1890) as well as in later works. Frazer claimed that Adonis was just one example of the archetype of a "dying-and-rising god" found throughout all cultures. In the mid-twentieth century, some scholars began to criticise the designation of "dying-and-rising god", in some cases arguing that deities like Adonis, previously referred to as "dying and rising", would be better termed separately as "dying gods" and "disappearing gods", asserting that gods who "died" did not return, and those who returned never "really" died.

Biblical scholars Eddy and Boyd (2007) applied this rationale to Adonis based on the fact that his portion of the year spent in the Underworld with Persephone is not really a death and resurrection, but merely an instance of a living person staying in the Underworld. They further argued that Adonis is not explicitly described as rising from the dead in any extant Classical Greek writings, though the fact that such a belief existed is attested by authors in Late Antiquity. For example, Origen discusses Adonis, whom he associates with Tammuz, in his Selecta in Ezechielem ( "Comments on Ezekiel"), noting that "they say that for a long time certain rites of initiation are conducted: first, that they weep for him, since he has died; second, that they rejoice for him because he has risen from the dead (apo nekrôn anastanti)" (cf. J.-P. Migne, Patrologiae Cursus Completus: Series Graeca, 13:800).

Some other scholars have continued to cite Adonis/Tammuz as an example of a dying and rising god, suggesting that the descent into and return from the underworld is a functional analogue for death even if no physical cause of death is depicted.

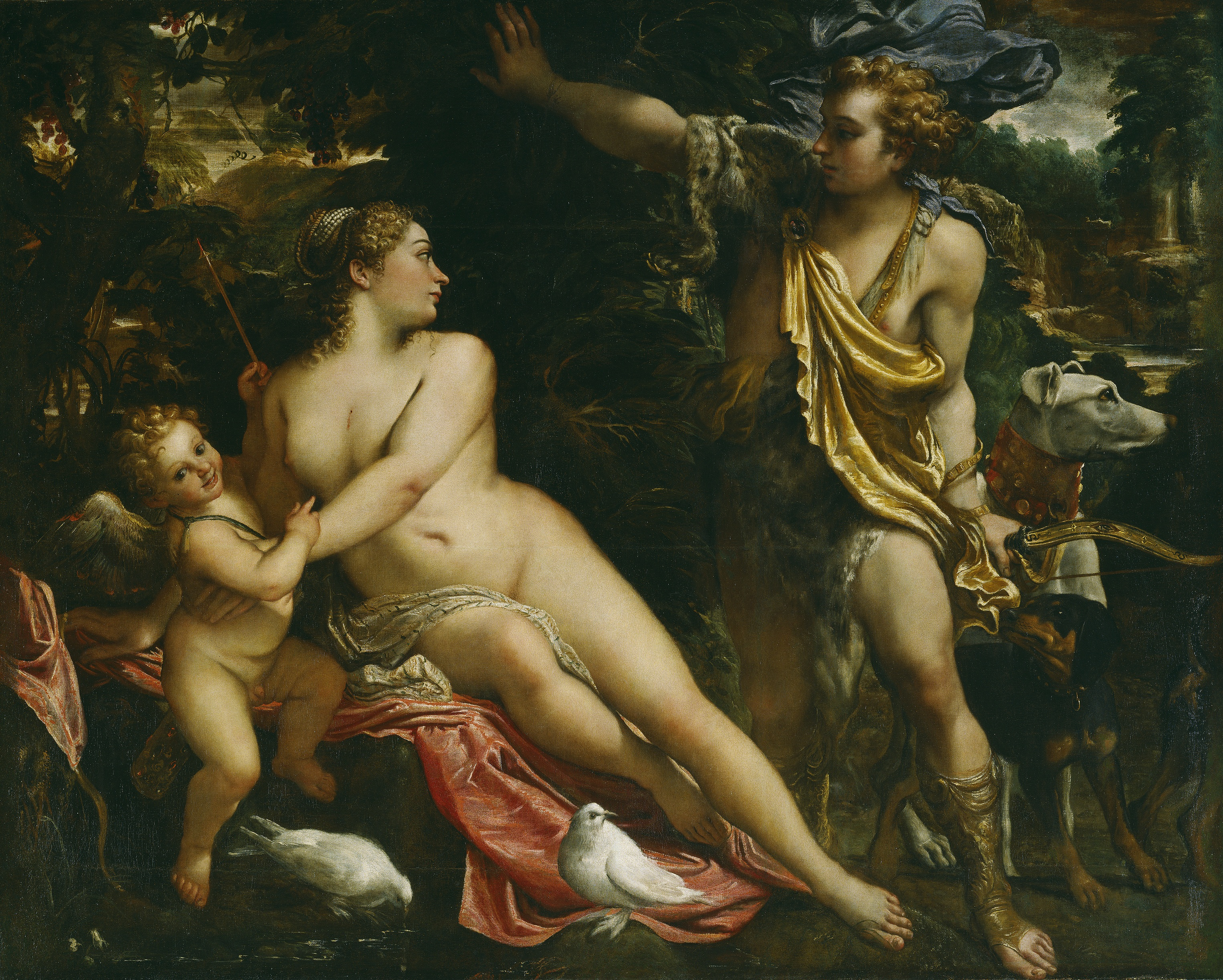
Venus and Adonis (c. 1595) by Annibale Carracci

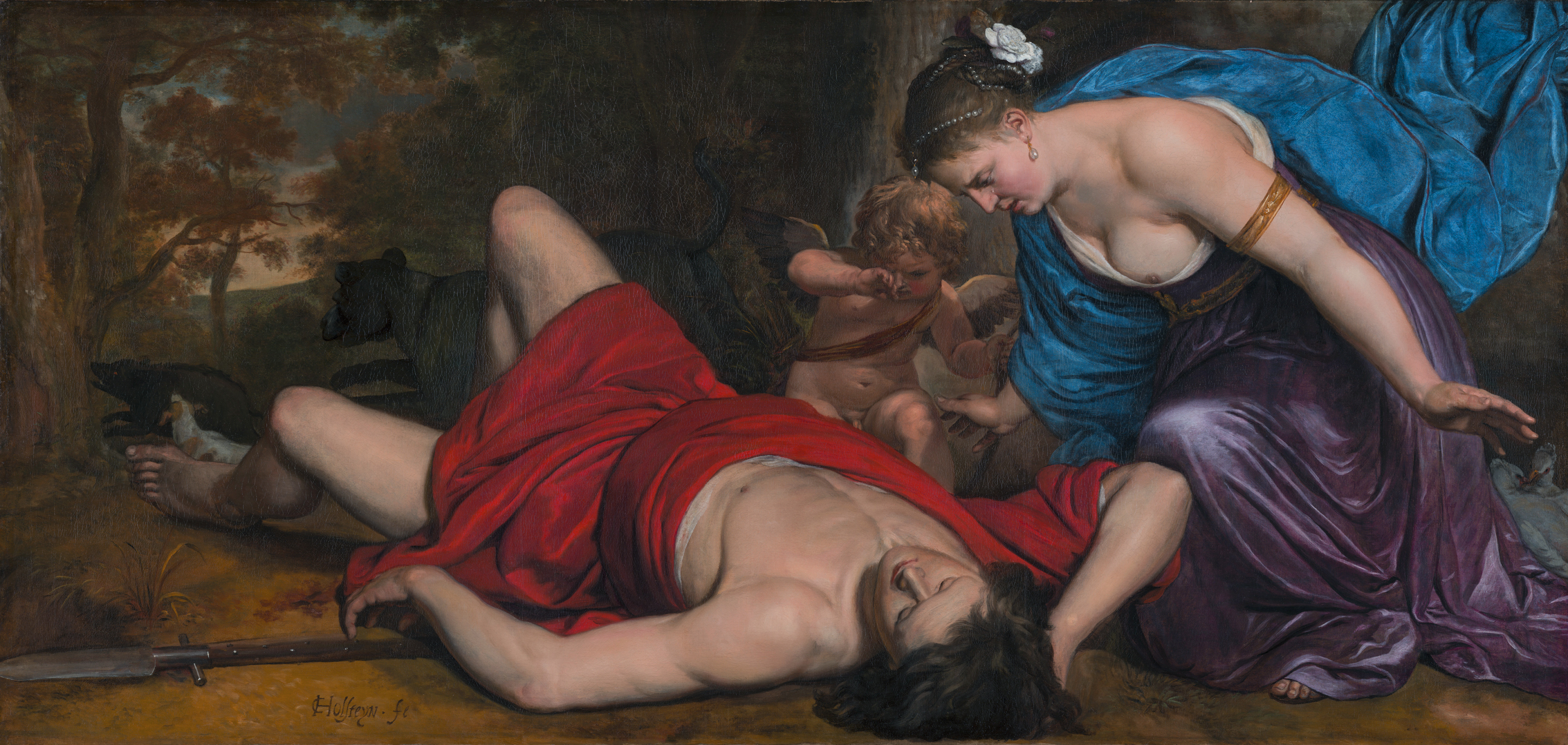
Venus and Cupid lamenting the dead Adonis (1656) by Cornelis Holsteyn

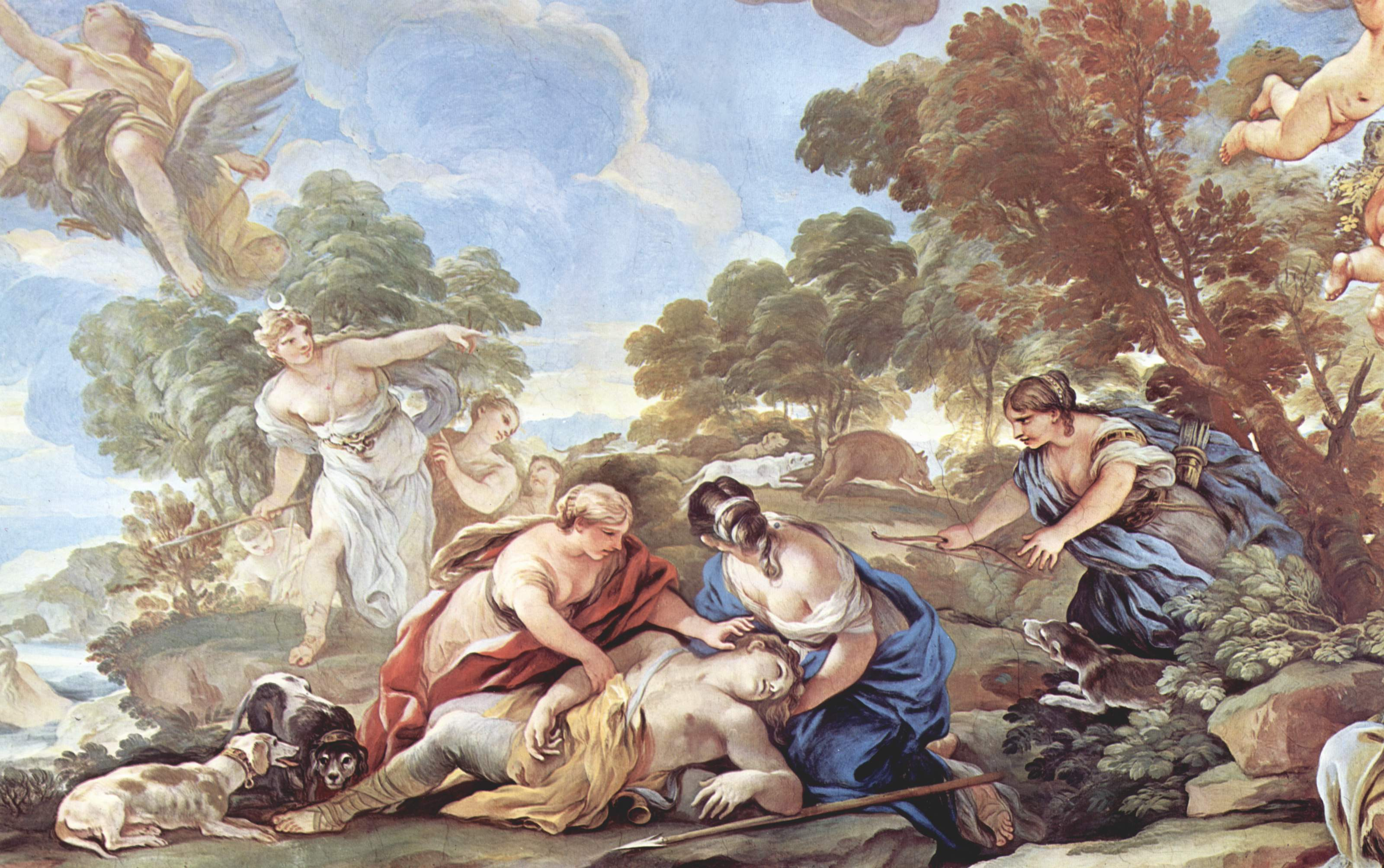
Death of Adonis (1684–1686) by Luca Giordano

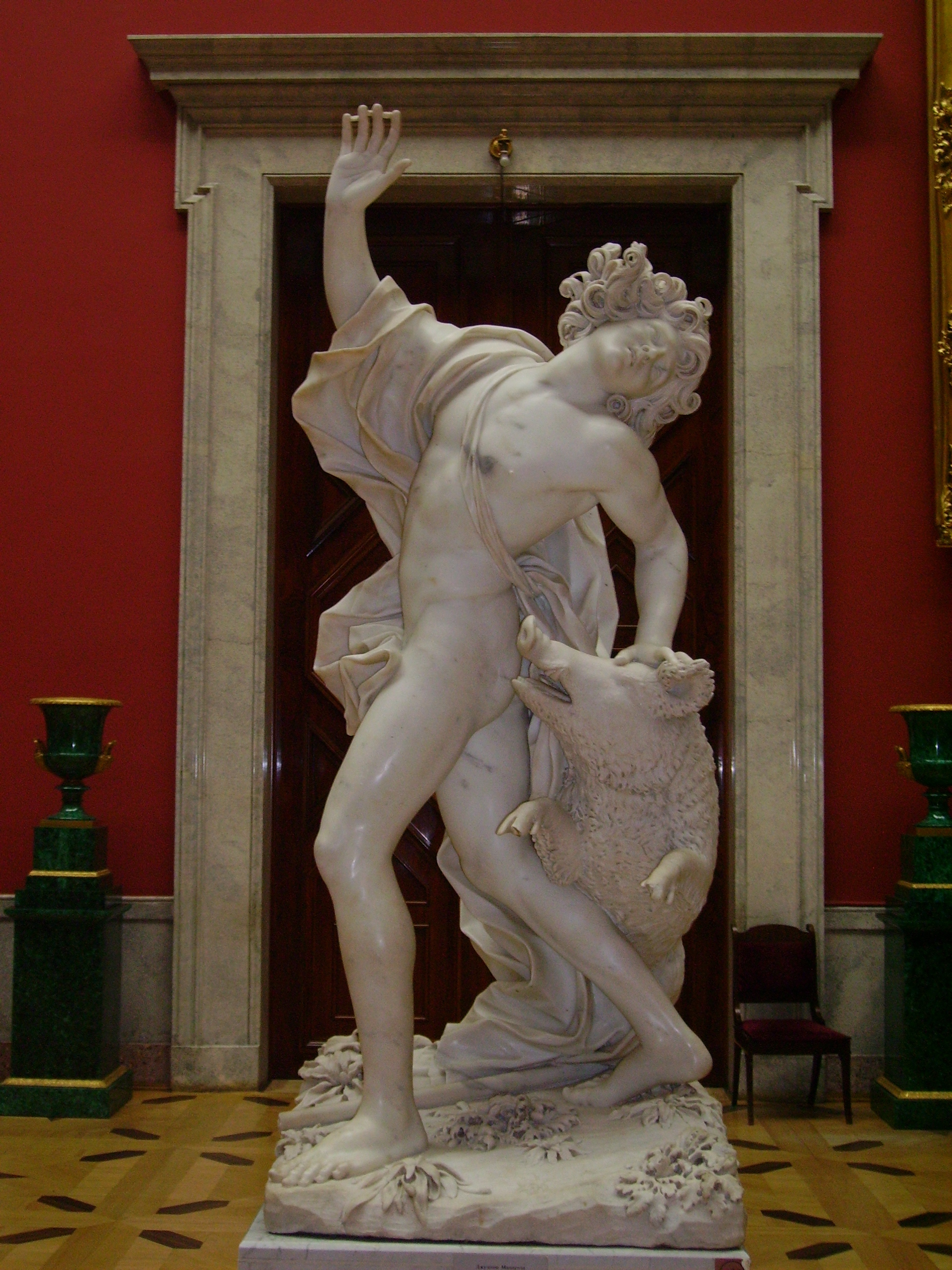
The Death of Adonis (Mazzuoli) (1709) by Giuseppe Mazzuoli

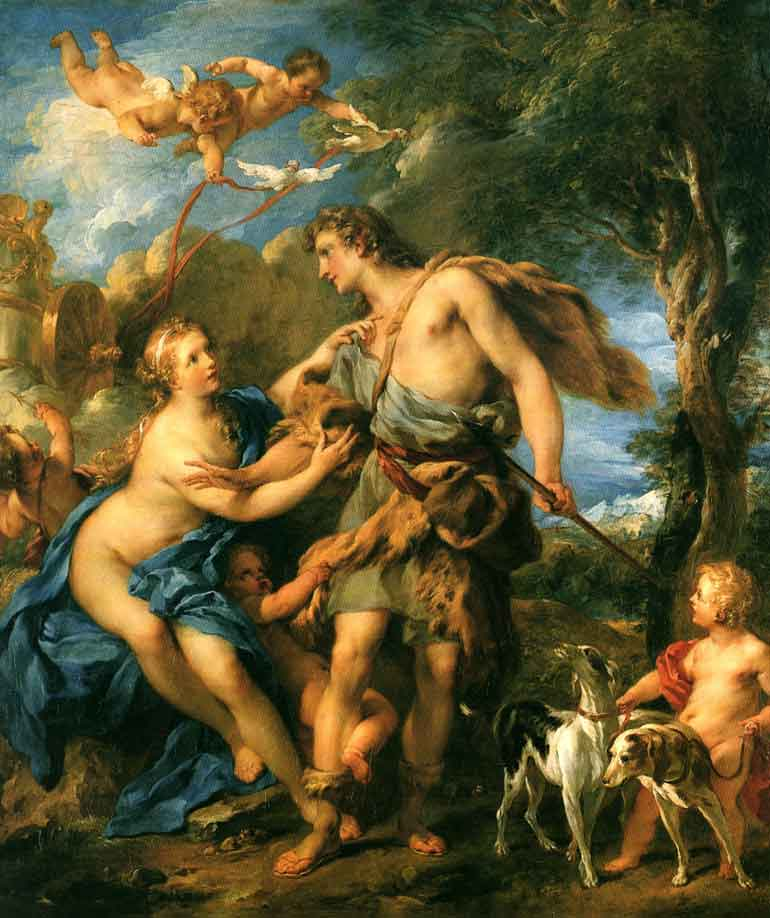
Venus and Adonis (1792) by François Lemoyne

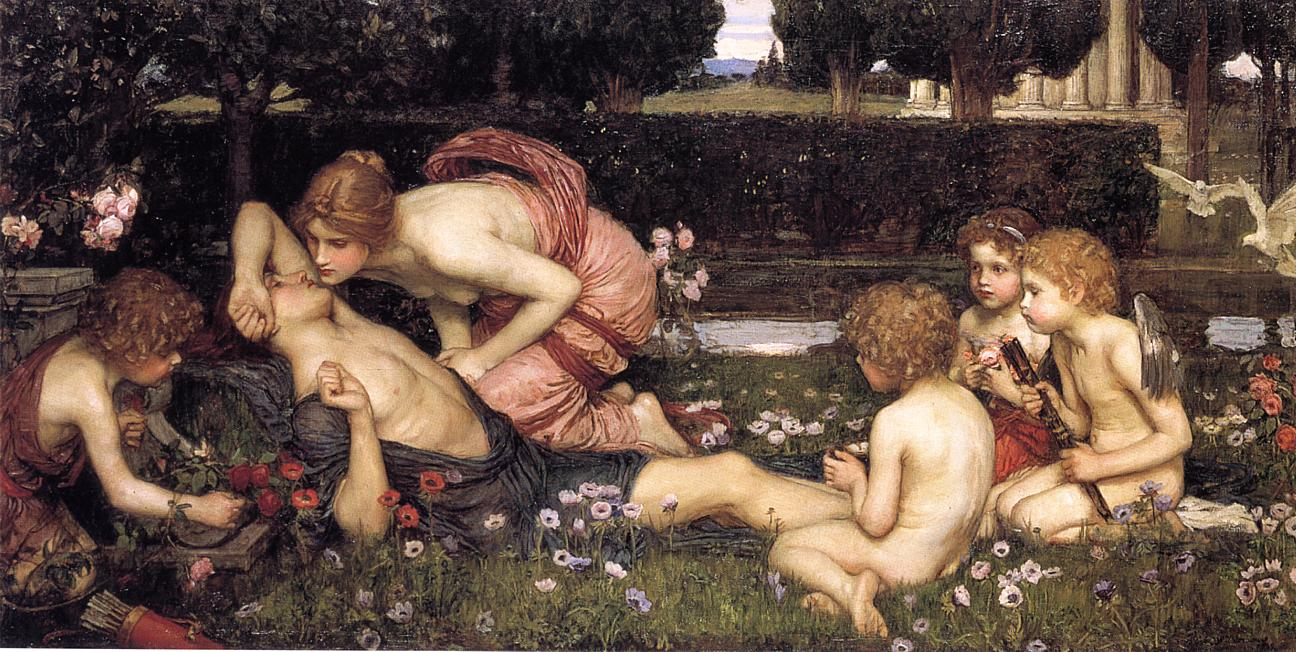
The Awakening of Adonis (1899–1900) by John William Waterhouse

== See also ==
- Adonism (religion)
- Apheca, the ancient name of Afqa in Lebanon
- Adonis belt (anatomy)
- Adonis blue, a brilliantly blue colored little butterfly

Psychology:

- Muscle dysmorphia, as part of the Adonis Complex
- Theorizing about Myth: A Jungian interpretation of the Adonis myth by R. Segal

== Bibliography ==
- Ovid, Metamorphoses. Translated by A. D. Melville; introduction and notes by E. J. Kenney. Oxford: Oxford University Press. 2008. ISBN 978-0-19-953737-2.
- Gaius Julius Hyginus, Astronomica from The Myths of Hyginus translated and edited by Mary Grant. University of Kansas Publications in Humanistic Studies. Online version at the Topos Text Project.
- Apollodorus, Apollodorus, The Library, with an English Translation by Sir James George Frazer, F.B.A., F.R.S. in 2 Volumes. Cambridge, Massachusetts, Harvard University Press; London, William Heinemann Ltd. 1921. Online version at the Perseus Digital Library.
- Aelian, On Animals, Volume III: Books 12-17, translated by A. F. Scholfield, Loeb Classical Library No. 449, Cambridge, Massachusetts, Harvard University Press, 1959. Online version at Harvard University Press. ISBN 978-0-674-99494-2.
- Lucian, Dialogues of the Gods; translated by Fowler, H W and F G. Oxford: The Clarendon Press. 1905.
- The Greek Anthology, with an English translation by W. R. Paton. London. William Heinemann Ltd. 1916. 1. Full text available at topostext.org.
- Barstad, Hans M. (1984), The Religious Polemics of Amos: Studies in the Preaching of Am 2, 7B-8; 4,1-13; 5,1-27; 6,4-7; 8,14, Leiden, The Netherlands: Brill, ISBN 9789004070172
- Bell, Robert E., Women of Classical Mythology: A Biographical Dictionary, ABC-CLIO 1991, ISBN 0-87436-581-3. Internet Archive.
- Botterweck, G. Johannes; Ringgren, Helmer (1990), Theological Dictionary of the Old Testament, vol. VI, Grand Rapids, Michigan: Wm. B. Eerdmans Publishing Co., ISBN 978-0-8028-2330-4
- Burkert, Walter (1985), Greek Religion, Cambridge, Massachusetts: Harvard University Press, ISBN 0-674-36281-0
- Burkert, Walter (1998) [1992], The Orientalizing Revolution: Near Eastern Influence on Greek Culture in the Early Archaic Age, Harvard University Press, ISBN 978-0674643642
- Corrente, Paola (2012), Dioniso y los Dying gods: paralelos metodológicos, Universidad Complutense de Madrid
- Corrente, Paola (2019), Philology and the Comparative Study of Myths, The Religious Studies Project
- Cyrino, Monica S. (2010), Aphrodite, Gods and Heroes of the Ancient World, New York City, New York and London, England: Routledge, ISBN 978-0-415-77523-6
- Detienne, Marcel (1977). "Introduction by J.-P. Vernant". The Gardens of Adonis: Spices in Greek Mythology. Translated by Lloyd, Janet. New Jersey: The Humanities Press. p. xii. ISBN 0691001049.
- Dalley, Stephanie (1989). Myths from Mesopotamia: Creation, the Flood, Gilgamesh, and Others. Oxford, England: Oxford University Press. ISBN 978-0-19-283589-5.
- Eddy, Paul Rhodes; Boyd, Gregory A. (2007), The Jesus Legend: A Case for the Historical Reliability of the Synoptic Jesus Tradition, Grand Rapids, Michigan: Baker Academic, ISBN 978-0801031144
- Ehrman, Bart D. (2012). Did Jesus Exist?: The Historical Argument for Jesus of Nazareth. New York City, new York: HarperCollins. ISBN 978-0-06-220644-2.
- Fontenrose, Joseph Eddy (1981). Orion: The Myth of the Hunter and the Huntress. University of California Press. ISBN 0-520-09632-0.
- Grimal, Pierre, The Dictionary of Classical Mythology, Wiley-Blackwell, 1996, ISBN 978-0-631-20102-1.
- Hansen, William F. (2004), Classical Mythology: A Guide to the Mythical World of the Greeks and Romans, Oxford, England: Oxford University Press, ISBN 978-0-19-530035-2
- Hiscock, Andrew (2017), ""Suppose thou dost defend me from what is past": Shakespeare's Venus and Adonis and The Rape of Lucrece and the appetite for ancient memory", in Hiscock, Andrew; Wilder, Lina Perkins (eds.), The Routledge Handbook of Shakespeare and Memory, New York City, New York and London, England: Routledge, ISBN 978-1-315-74594-7
- Hull, Elizabeth M. (2010), "Adonis", in Grafton, Anthony; Most, Glenn W.; Settis, Salvatore (eds.), The Classical Tradition, Cambridge, Massachusetts and London, England: The Belknap Press of Harvard University Press, pp. 7–8, ISBN 978-0-674-03572-0
- Lákta, Peter (2017), ""All Adonises Must Die": Shakespeare's Venus and Adonis and the episodic imaginary", in Marrapodi, Michele (ed.), Shakespeare and the Visual Arts: The Italian Influence, New York City, New York and London, England: Routledge, ISBN 978-1-315-21225-8
- Mettinger, Tryggve N. D. (2004), "The "Dying and Rising God": A Survey of Research from Frazer to the Present Day", in Batto, Bernard F.; Roberts, Kathryn L. (eds.), David and Zion: Biblical Studies in Honor of J.J.M. Roberts, Winona Lake, Indiana: Eisenbrauns, ISBN 1-57506-092-2
- Smith, Jonathan Z. (1987), "Dying and Rising Gods", in Eliade, Mircea (ed.), The Encyclopedia of Religion, vol. IV, London, England: Macmillan, pp. 521–527, ISBN 0029097002
- Kerényi, Karl (1951), The Gods of the Greeks, London, England: Thames and Hudson
- Lung, Tang (2014), "Marriage of Inanna and Dumuzi", World History Encyclopedia
- Mahony, Patrick J. An Analysis of Shelley's Craftsmanship in Adonais. Rice University, 1964.
- O'Brian, Patrick. "Post Captain." Aubrey/Maturin series. W.W. Norton, pg. 198. 1994.
- Thiollet, Jean-Pierre, 2005. Je m'appelle Byblos, H & D, pp. 71-80.
- Pryke, Louise M. (2017), Ishtar, New York and London: Routledge, ISBN 978-1-138--86073-5
- Tripp, Edward, Crowell's Handbook of Classical Mythology, Thomas Y. Crowell Co; First edition (June 1970). ISBN 069022608X.
- Warner, Marina (2016) [1976], Alone of All Her Sex: The Myth and Cult of the Virgin Mary, Oxford, England: Oxford University Press, ISBN 978-0-19-963994-6
- West, M. L. (1997), The East Face of Helicon: West Asiatic Elements in Greek Poetry and Myth, Oxford, England: Clarendon Press, p. 57, ISBN 0-19-815221-3
