= Golgos =

Minor Greek mythological figure

In Greek mythology, Golgos or Golgus (Ancient Greek: Γόλγος, romanized: Gólgos) is the son of Aphrodite and Adonis, brother of Beroe, and according to one tradition the founder of the Ancient city of Golgi (Also known as Cyprian Golgi, located in modern-day Larnaca District in Cyprus).
