= Beroe (Beirut nymph) =

Nymph in Greek mythology

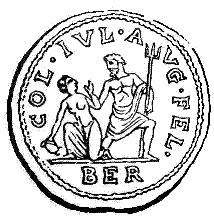
Neptune and Beroë. A large brass, struck at Berytus, bears on its obverse the head of Elagabalus; and on the other side COL. IVL. AVG. FEL. BER. with the "remarkable type", which, from a specimen in the British Museum, is copied in this cut.

Beroe (Ancient Greek: Βερόη Beróē), in Greek mythology, is a nymph of Beirut, the daughter of Aphrodite and Adonis, and sister of Golgos. She was wooed by both Dionysus and Poseidon, eventually choosing Poseidon as a lover. She was also called Amymone.

== Mythology ==
At the birth of Beroe, Hermes acted as the midwife and assisted in the delivery of Beroe then the Virgin Astraia (lady of justice) took the infant Beroe and fed her with the wise breast and told her words of law, feeding her honey and washing her with sacred water. In her youth, she briefly served the goddess Artemis. As she grew up, she was highly regarded as an outstanding beauty and destined to marry Poseidon. Eros struck her twice with arrows of love and a confrontation took place for her love. Beroe wore no ornaments or make-up, and she was not vain and never examined herself in the mirror. Beroe was a mortal but often her beauty was compared to that of goddesses.

== See also ==
- List of Greek deities
