= Myrice (mythology) =

Greek Cypriot mythological figure

In Greek mythology, Myrice (/ˈmɪərɪsiː/ MEER-ee-see; Ancient Greek: Μυρίκη, romanized: Muríkē, lit. 'tamarix' pronounced [myríkɛː]) is a minor figure from the island of Cyprus. Like both of her siblings Myrrha and Amaracus, she was transformed into a plant bearing her name.

== Family ==
She was the daughter of Cinyras, a king of Cyprus, and thus sister to Myrrha and Amaracus, thus aunt/half-sister to Adonis.

== Mythology ==
The mournful (Note: Hesychius tried to link her name with the verb μύρεσθαι, myresthai, "to mourn".) Myrice was transformed into a tamarix tree (μυρίκη in ancient Greek), possibly by Aphrodite, as the tamarisk was her sacred tree. The implication seems to be that Myrice was grieving the death of her kinsman Adonis, who was gored by a boar during hunting. Additionally, a Hellenistic and Roman-era cult dedicated to Myricaean Apollo (Μυρικαίος Ἀπόλλων, "Apollo of the Tamarisk") is attested on the Northeastern Aegean island of Lesbos.

== See also ==
- Melos
- Heliades
- Pelia
- Clytie
- Cyparissus
- Alcyone and Ceyx

== Bibliography ==
- Hesychius of Alexandria (1792). Hesychii Lexicon ex codice ms. Bibliothecae D. Marci restitutum et ab omnibus Musuri correctionibus repurgatum, sive, Supplementa ad editionem Hesychii Albertinam (in Greek). Translated by Schow Niels. Lipsiae.
- Farrar, Linda (2016). Gardens and Gardeners of the Ancient World: History, Myth and Archaeology. Oxbow Books. ISBN 978-1-909686-85-4.
- Folkard, Richard (1884). Plant Lore, Legends, and Lyrics: Embracing the Myths, Traditions, Superstitions, and Folk-lore of the Plant Kingdom. Michigan: S. Low, Marston, Searle, and Rivington.
- Forbes Irving, Paul M. C. (1990). Metamorphosis in Greek Myths. Clarendon Press. ISBN 0-19-814730-9.
- Kourtzellis, Yannis (2019). "The Sanctuaries on the Island of Lesbos from an Architectural and Topographical Perspective". In Elena C. Partida; Barbara Schmidt-Dounas (eds.). Listening to the Stones: Essays on Architecture and Function in Ancient Greek Sanctuaries in Honour of Richard Alan Tomlinson. Archaeopress. doi:10.2307/j.ctvr00x79. S2CID 240990698.
- Murr, Josef (1890). Die Pflanzenwelt in der griechischen Mythologie (in German). Wagnerische Universitäts-Buchhandlung.
- Tümpel, K. (1894). "Myrike". In Wilhelm Heinrich Roscher (ed.). Ausführliches Lexikon der griechischen und römischen Mythologie [Detailed dictionary of Greek and Roman mythology] (in German). Vol. II, L–M. Leipzig: Teubner-Verlag.
