= Grape cluster =

Fertilized inflorescence of the grapevine

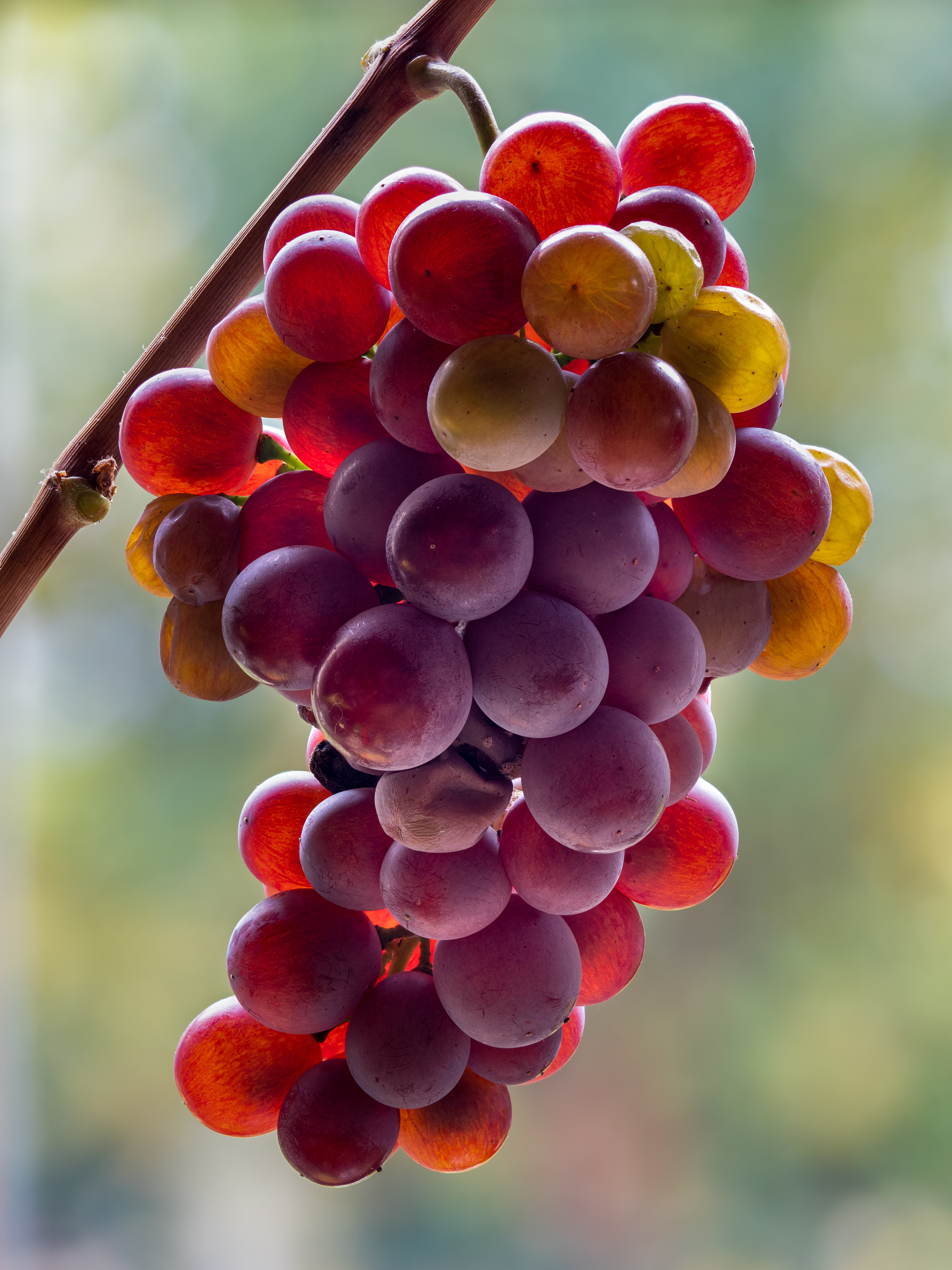

In viticulture, the grape cluster (also bunch of grapes) is a fertilized inflorescence of the grapevine, the primary part of this plant used for food (in addition to grapes, grape leaves are also used in some culinary traditions). The size of the grape bunch greatly varies, from few grams to kilograms, depending on the grape variety and conditions during the fruit set.

== Architecture ==
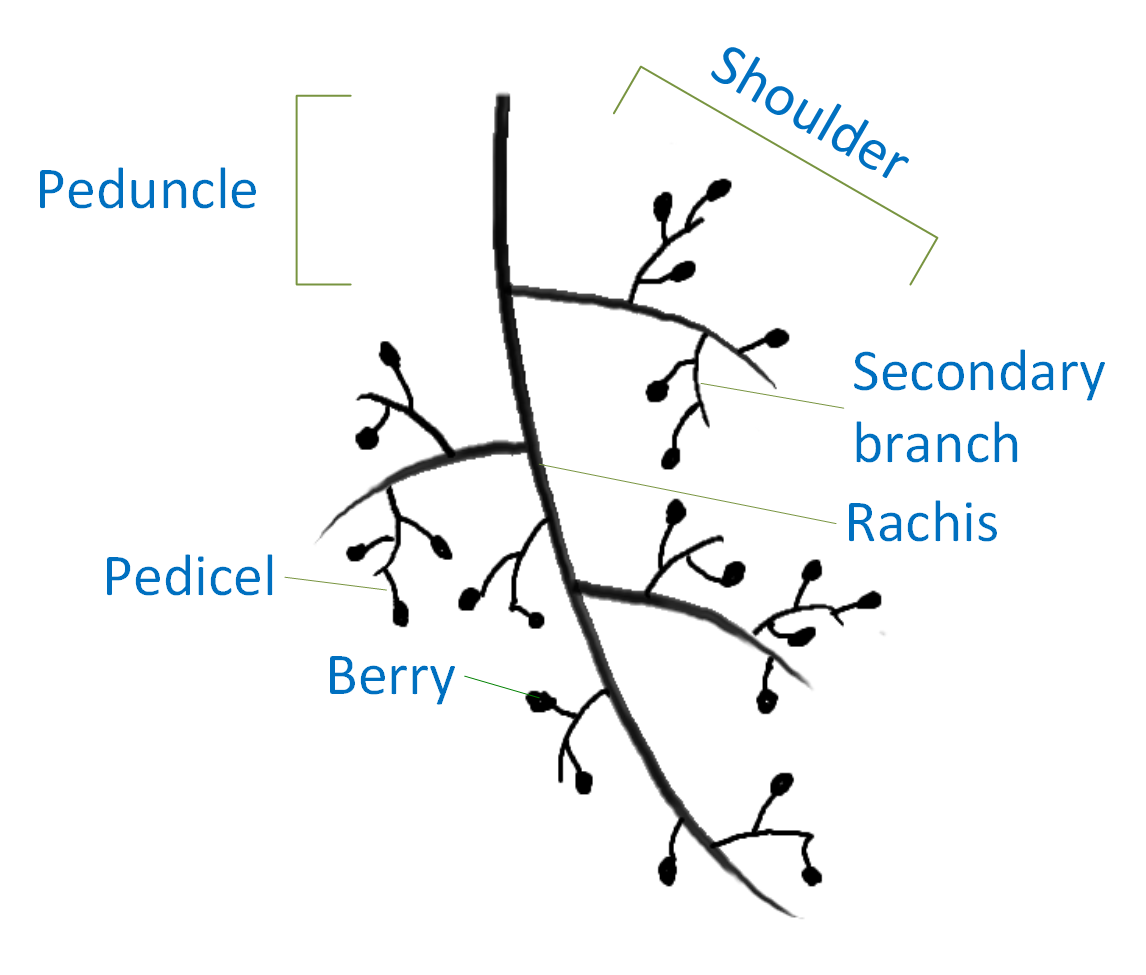
Grape cluster architecture

The placement of a cluster on the vine is similar to that of a tendril, as both develop from the same uncommitted primordia, the anlagen. The grape bunch position on the side of the stem opposing a leaf is unusual for inflorescence of the plants. The typical shape of a cluster depends on the grape variety.

The bunch of grapes, like a tendril, has two arms. The inner arm develops into a full-grown cluster, the smaller outer one might die off, develop into a small tendril-like arm with no fruit, or form a large "wing" with berries that sometimes ripen differently than the ones of the main cluster (for example, in Trebbiano).

The grape cluster is shaped as a panicle, with the main branch ("axis") called rachis. Additional branches ("shoulders" or branch-twigs) are connected to the rachis irregularly and split into pedicels (short stems attaching individual berries). In a large cluster, the shoulders might bear secondary (sub-twigs) and sometimes tertiary branches before ending up with pedicels (the twig carrying the pedicels is also known as a terminal pedicel twig). The beginning of the rachis before the first split is called a peduncle. In a ripe cluster the peduncle might be the only fully visible part of the cluster branches.

The arrangement of the branches, so called cluster architecture, determines the distribution of berries and free space within the cluster. The architecture is complex and influences yield, quality, and resistance to pests and diseases. While mostly determined by the ramification patterns of the rachis, its development can be influenced by management technique, like leaf removal.

A relational growth grammar (RGG) can be used to describe the architecture of a cluster.

== Development ==
During the rapid growth phase of the vine shoot, future leaf buds and fruit buds are identical. A fruit bud differentiation process occurs in a mature vine under proper climatic and growth conditions will cause some buds to develop into the fruit ones. The rudiments of the future flower clusters are formed during the summer season preceding the year of flowering and develop after a winter rest. The flowers develop simultaneously with the leaves, starting with calyx (about a week into the leafing phase) and followed by corolla (another week), stamens, and pistil. The flowering takes about 45 to 70 days. The small greenish flowers are usually bisexual ("perfect"). The latter trait is most likely an effect of a long cultivation, the newer (mostly American) varieties have imperfect flowers with varying intersex degrees. Self-pollination is typical.

Fruit set usually involves seed development, although multiple "seedless" varieties exist where the berries contain practically no trace of seed (Black Corinth), just the embryo seeds (Thompson Seedless a.k.a. sultana), or complete, but empty seeds (Chaouch).

Berry development after set includes three periods:

1. rapid growth of pericarp through cell division followed by cell enlargement (5-7 weeks post-anthesis). The berry is green and acid;
2. slower growth with hardening of endocarp (2-4 weeks. The berry reaches peak of acidity and starts to accumulate sugar. Reduction in chlorophyll levels causes change of color;
3. rapid growth returns (through cell enlargement, for 5-8 weeks). The period sees accumulation of sugar, changes of the skin color for red and black varieties, decrease in acidity and development of aroma.

As the berry develops, it reaches the state of ripening that depends on the future use of the fruit (the requirements might call, for example for higher acidity, or its opposite, higher sugar content). Past this stage, the berry is overripened (typically loses the acidity, glucose content, and mechanical sturdiness).

== Harvesting ==
The harvesting is done by cutting the entire clusters off the vine and packing them into containers. The clusters rarely reach ripeness simultaneously, so frequently two or more pickings are used, with pickers selecting the clusters based on the appearance of the berries and stems (and occasional tasting of the berries).

== Symbolism ==
Grape cluster might refer to very diverse notions, from unity to immorality, it can also be a symbol of the gods of agriculture or fertility.

Ancient Greek art though of clusters of grapes as symbols of fertility and sacrifice, the latter one due to blood-colored wine they produced, birds eating grapes were thought of as an expression of afterlife. Personification of the grape bunch was represented by Staphylus. In one myth, a goatherd named Staphylus discovered grapes (and their sweet juice) after observing one of his master's goats getting fat and frolicsome.

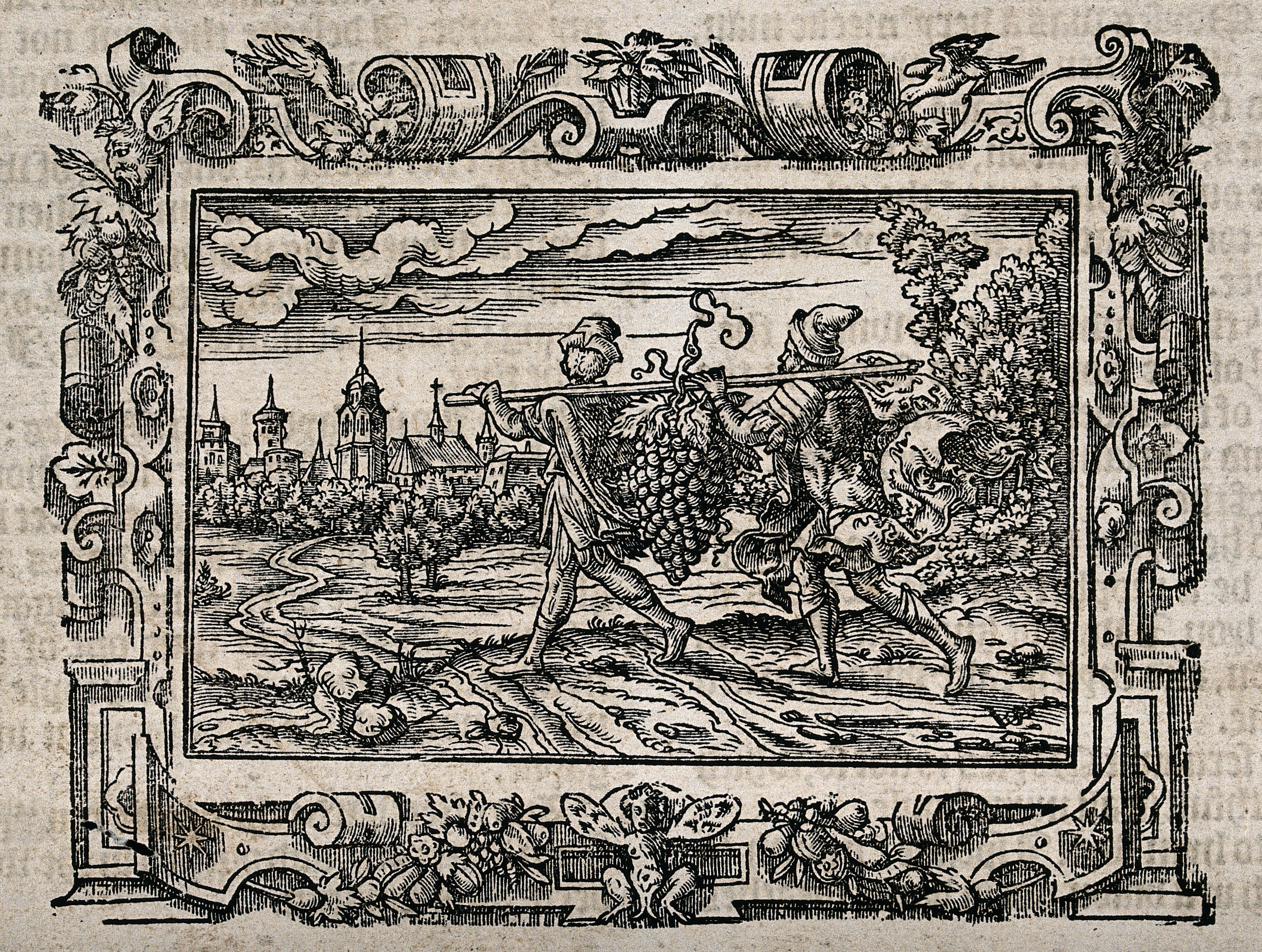
Moses' spies

Like many other fruits and flowers, grape clusters are frequently used as symbols in the Christian art. Along with ears of wheat they represent the Eucharist, depicted alone might allude to the True Vine (playing the role similar to the lotus in Buddhism: "I am the vine"). In the early Christianity, clusters were occasionally combined with cherubs, possibly under the influence of Bacchus worship. Two men that carry a gigantic grape cluster on a pole are Moses' spies returning from the Promised Land, this image is also frequently used in modern Israel to promote the tourism and wine. The Bible also contains an analogy between the grape cluster and female breasts.

Judaism used the bunch of grapes as a symbol of the nation of Israel. Gary Porton (1976) suggests that the grape cluster in Judaism represents the (possibly Messianic) "great man" and points to its use during the bar Kokhba revolt. Menahem Mor (2016) argues that a grape cluster on the Israeli coins of the Second Temple period depicts fertility and should be understood as a national, and not religious, symbol.

Heraldry frequently does not make a distinction between a grape cluster and a vine charges, the proper tincture of the fruit is purpure, the typical meaning is direct (vineyard or wine production). In military symbols, a cluster corresponds to action in a wine-producing region (like France).

== Decoration ==
The grape bunch is prolifically used in the decorative arts.

Hellenized Jews used cluster images for mosaics at synagogues and decorations of tombs, probably alluding to the Greek symbolism of an eternal life, over time, these decorations lost their religious symbolism. As a reminder of the harvest (and thus joy), clusters of grapes are hung in sukkah, and can frequently be seen on Kiddush and Shabbat objects.

== See also ==
- Botryoidal, a term in mineralogy, defining mineral deposits shaped like a bunch of grapes

== Sources ==
- Coombe, Bryan (2015). "bunch". The Oxford Companion to Wine. Oxford Companions Series. Oxford University Press. ISBN 978-0-19-870538-3.
- Dogan, Yunus; Nedelcheva, Anely; Łuczaj, Łukasz; Drăgulescu, Constantin; Stefkov, Gjoshe; Maglajlić, Aida; Ferrier, Jonathan; Papp, Nora; Hajdari, Avni; Mustafa, Behxhet; Dajić-Stevanović, Zora; Pieroni, Andrea (2015). "Of the Importance of a Leaf: The Ethnobotany of Sarma in Turkey and the Balkans". Journal of Ethnobiology and Ethnomedicine. 11 26. doi:10.1186/s13002-015-0002-x. PMC 4428097. PMID 25890379.
- Coumbe, C.W. (1920). "Vine in Art and Symbolism" . In Rines, George Edwin (ed.). Encyclopedia Americana. Vol. XXVIII.
- Fox-Davies, A.C. (1909). A Complete Guide to Heraldry. T.C. & E.C. Jack.
- Frankel, E.; Teutsch, B.P. (1995). "Grapes". The Encyclopedia of Jewish Symbols. Jason Aronson, Incorporated. ISBN 978-1-4616-3125-5.
- Galet, P.; Towey, J. (2000). "Clusters and Berries". General Viticulture. Avenir oenologie. Oenoplurimédia. ISBN 978-2-905428-13-4.
- Gough, H.; Parker, J. (1894). "Vine". A Glossary of Terms Used in Heraldry. J. Parker. pp. 602–603.
- Hayward, Robert (1990). "The Vine and Its Products As Theological Symbols in First Century Palestinian Judaism". Durham University Journal. 82: 9–18.
- Hess, R. S. (2008). "Floral Imagery". In Longman, T.; Enns, P. (eds.). Dictionary of the Old Testament: Wisdom, Poetry & Writings: A Compendium of Contemporary Biblical Scholarship. The IVP Bible Dictionary Series. InterVarsity Press. pp. 218–222. ISBN 978-0-8308-1783-2.
- Longenecker, B.W. (1995). Two Esdras. Guides to Apocrypha and Pseudepigrapha (in Spanish). Sheffield Academic Press. ISBN 978-1-85075-726-9.
- Mor, Menahem (2016). The Second Jewish Revolt: The Bar Kokhba War, 132-136 CE. The Brill Reference Library of Judaism. Brill. ISBN 978-90-04-31463-4.
- Murray, Peter; Murray, Linda (1998). The Oxford Companion to Christian Art and Architecture. Oxford: Oxford University Press, USA. ISBN 0-19-860216-2.
- Olderr, S. (2017). "grapes". Symbolism: A Comprehensive Dictionary, 2d ed (in Basque). McFarland, Incorporated, Publishers. pp. 99–100. ISBN 978-0-7864-9067-7.
- Porton, Gary G. (1 October 1976). "The Grape-Cluster in Jewish Literature and Art of Late Antiquity". Journal of Jewish Studies. 27 (2): 159–176. doi:10.18647/788/JJS-1976.
- Rose, Herbert Jennings (2015-12-22). "Staphylus (1), personification of the grape-cluster". Oxford Research Encyclopedia of Classics. Oxford University Press. doi:10.1093/acrefore/9780199381135.013.6058. ISBN 978-0-19-938113-5.
- Schöler, Florian; Steinhage, Volker (2015). "Automated 3D reconstruction of grape cluster architecture from sensor data for efficient phenotyping". Computers and Electronics in Agriculture. 114. Elsevier BV: 163–177. Bibcode:2015CEAgr.114..163S. doi:10.1016/j.compag.2015.04.001. ISSN 0168-1699.
- Torres-Lomas, Efrain; Lado-Bega, Jimena; Garcia-Zamora, Guillermo; Diaz-Garcia, Luis (27 Jun 2024). "Segment Anything for Comprehensive Analysis of Grapevine Cluster Architecture and Berry Properties". Plant Phenomics. 6: 0202. Bibcode:2024PlPhe...6..202T. doi:10.34133/plantphenomics.0202. PMC 11208874. PMID 38939746.
- Winkler, A.J. (1962). "Harvesting and Packing Table Grapes". General Viticulture. University of California Press.
- Winkler, A.J. (1974). "The Grape Flower and Berry Set". General Viticulture: Second Revised Edition. University of California Press. pp. 111–137. ISBN 978-0-520-02591-2.
