= Vatican Mythographers =

Anonymous authors of three Latin mythographical texts

First page of the First Mythographer in Reg. lat. 1401

The so-called Vatican Mythographers (Latin: Mythographi Vaticani) are the anonymous authors of three Latin mythographical texts found together in a single medieval manuscript, Vatican Reg. lat. 1401. The name is that used by Angelo Mai when he published the first edition of the works in 1831. The text of the First Vatican Mythographer is found only in the Vatican manuscript; the second and third texts are found separately in other manuscripts, leading scholars to refer to a Second Vatican Mythographer and a Third Vatican Mythographer.

== Content ==
Taken together, the works of the Vatican Mythographers provided a source-book of Greek and Roman myths and their iconography throughout the Middle Ages and the Renaissance. The texts, which were being copied in manuscripts as late as the 15th century, were parsed allegorically to provide Christianized moral and theological implications, "until in time the pagan divinities blossomed into full-fledged vices and virtues". Their testimonia, sources, and parallel passages constitute central documents in the transmission of classical culture to the medieval world, which is a major theme in the history of ideas in the West—though the texts have also been described as "highly deceptive sources which should be used with much caution".

Mai made many slips in rapidly transcribing the manuscript under difficult conditions, and he was in the habit of substituting euphemisms where the original was too sexually explicit to transcribe and publish, even in Latin. A revised, indexed edition of 1834, corrected by Georg Heinrich Bode without access to the Vatican manuscript, is the version that replaced Mai's first edition and has been drawn on in popular 20th-century anthologies of Greek mythology, such as those by Edith Hamilton, Robert Graves, and Karl Kerenyi.

The work of the First Vatican Mythographer is essentially a pared-down "fact-book" of mythology, stripped of nuance, not unlike the Fabulae of Hyginus, who, however, had provided no Roman stories and so could not suffice. Classical authors are rarely quoted directly, but the author seems to have used the commentary on Virgil by Servius and the scholiasts on Statius as sources. A modern edition of the text was published in 1995 by Nevio Zorzetti. On the basis of the latest source cited in it and the date of the first source to cite it, Zorzetti dates the composition of the work between the last quarter of the 9th century and the third quarter of the 11th century.

Nineteen manuscripts (including several fragments) are known for the second text, and more than forty for the third. The work of the Second Vatican Mythographer, which draws on that of the first, though it is considerably longer, perhaps dates to the 11th century. A modern edition of it was produced by Péter Kulcsár in 1987. In 2014, Alena Hadravová identified two new, previously unknown copies of the Second Vatican Mythographer in the National Library in Prague: MS Prague, NL, IX C 3 (1401), and MS Prague, NL, III C 18 (late 14th or early 15th century). In 2017, she published editions of both copies in a Czech-English commented book.

The work of the Third Vatican Mythographer, which differs from the others by containing "extensive allegorical interpretations", has often been attributed either to a certain Alberic of London, who is named in a number of the manuscripts, or to Alexander Neckam.

== Stories ==
=== First Vatican Mythographer ===
- Prometheus
- The Story of Neptune and Minerva
- The Story of Scylla
- The Story of Tereus and Procne
- The Story of the Cyclops and Acis
- The Story of Silvanus and Cyparissus
- The Story of Ceres and Proserpina
- The Story of Celeus and Triptolemus
- The Story of Ceyx and Alcyone
- The Story of Ceres and Lyncus
- The Story of the Titans and the Giants
- Pelops
- The Story of Tityus
- The Story of Ixion
- The Story of Circe and Ulysses
- The Story of Tiresias
- The Story of Lycaon
- Io and Argus
- The Story of Icarius and Erigone
- The Story of Iphigenia and Orestes and Pylades
- The Story of Hippodame
- The Story of Myrtilus, Atreus, and Thyestes
- The Story of Phrixus and Helle
- The Story of Pelias and Jason
- The Story of Jason
- The Story of Orithyia
- The Story of Phineus
- The Story of Leander and Hero
- The Story of Cleobis and Bito
- The History of Amulius and Numitor
- The Story of Lyncus
- The Story of Oenopion
- The Story of Orion
- The Story of Amaracus
- The History of Palamedes
- The Story of Achilles
- The Story of Latona and Asterie
- The Story of the Hesperides
- The Story of Atalanta and Hippomenes
- The Story of Helenus
- The Story of Andromache and Molossus
- The Story of the Sirens
- The Story of Venus and Pasiphaë
- The Story of Procris
- The Story of Amymone and Palamedes
- Theseus and Hippolytus
- The Story of Minos and the Bull and Hercules
- The Story of Theseus and Pirithous and Hercules
- The Story of Hercules and Hylas
- The Story of Hercules and Alcmena
- The Story of Hercules and the Nemean Lion
- The Story of Molorchus
- The Story of Eryx and Hercules
- The Story of Hercules and Lake Ciminus
- The Story of Antaeus and Hercules
- The Story of Hercules and Alcinous and the Harpies
- The Story of Hercules and Tricerberus
- The Story of Hercules, Deianira, Oeneus, and the Centaur
- The Story of Philoctetes and Hercules
- The Story of the Grandsons of Hercules
- The Story of Pholus and Hercules
- The Story of the Hydra and Hercules
- The Story of the Hardships of Hercules
- The Story of Eurystheus and Hercules
- The Story of Busiris and Hercules
- The Story of Cacus and Hercules
- The Story of Geryon and Hercules
- The Story of Evander and Hercules
- The Story of Evander
- The Story of Bellerophon, Who Is Also Perseus
- The Story of the Chimera and Bellerophon
- Perseus
- The Story of Tarquin and Lucretia
- The Story of Hymeneus
- The Story of Orpheus and Eurydice
- The Story of Castor and Pollux
- The Story of the Swan and Leda
- The Story of Apis
- The Story of Tydeus and Polynices
- The Story of Sinicrus and Branchus
- The Story of Salmoneus
- The Story of Aloeus, Othus, and Ephialtes
- The Story of Ceculus
- The Story of the Three Proetides
- The Story of the Pierides
- The Story of Orista
- The Story of Liber, Silenus, King Midas and the River Pactolus
- On the Birth of Pan
- The Story of Pan
- The Story of Arachne and Minerva
- The Story of Alcestis
- The Story of Neptune and Amycus
- The Story of Neptune and Eryx
- The Story of Arion and the Dolphins
- [Untitled]
- The Story of Antiope, Zethus, and Amphion
- The Story of Nyctimene
- The Story of Glaucus
- The Story of Glaucus and Venus
- The Story of Chelone and Mercury
- The Story of Saturn and His Sons
- The Story of Saturn and Philyra and Chiron
- The Story of Jove's Birth
- The Story of Jove and Saturn and Venus
- The Story of Juno and the Garden of the Hesperides
- The Story of Neptune
- The Story of Pluto
- On the Three Furies, or Eumenides
- On the Three Fates
- On the Three Harpies, or Stymphalides
- On Proserpina, or Diana
- The Story of Apollo, or the Sun
- On the Nine Muses
- The Story of Apollo, the Raven, and Coronis, the Daughter of Phlegyas
- The Story of Apollo and Daphne, or the Laurel
- The Story of Apollo and Eridanus
- The Story of Mercury and His Mother, Maia
- The Story of Semele and Her Son, Father Liber
- The Story of Liber and Jove Ammon
- The Story of Liber and the Tyrrhenians
- The Story of Father Liber and King Lycurgus
- The Story of Minerva
- The Story of Priapus and Lotus the Nymph
- The Figurative Story of Pan
- The Story of Vulcan
- The Story of Phorcys
- The Story of the Three Gorgons and Perseus
- The Story of Medusa the Gorgon
- The Story of the Three Graces
- The Story of the Lemnian Women and Hypsipyle
- The Story of Danaus and Aegyptus
- The History of Dardanus and the Origin of the Trojans
- The Story of Laomedon and Hercules and Hesione
- The Story of Acesta and Hippotes
- The Story of Teucer
- The Story of Tithonus and Aurora
- The Story of Pyrrhus and Helenus
- The Story of Diomedes
- On Diomedes and the Palladium
- The Story of Diomedes' Companions
- On the Island of Euboea, and Nauplius, the Father of Palamedes
- On Another Euboea and the City of Cumae
- The Story of Meleager and Oeneus
- On Clytemnestra and Her son, Orestes
- The Story of Europa and Jove
- The Story of Agenor and His Son, Cadmus
- The Story of Cadmus and Harmonia
- On the Necklace of Harmonia
- The Story of Eteocles and Polynices and Amphiaraus
- The Story of Apollo and Sibyl
- The Story of Caenis (neither a Man nor a Woman) and Neptune
- The Story of Tarpeia
- The Story of Niobe and Her Children
- The Story of Acrisius and Danaë
- The Story of Laodamia
- The Story of Phyllis and Demophon
- The Story of Alcon
- The Story of Codrus
- The Story of Pirithous and Mars
- The Story of the Thessalians and the Centaurs
- The Story of the Phoenician Priestess
- The Story of Sisyphus and Aegina
- The Story of Arethusa and Alpheus
- The Story of Sciron
- On Crotopus and Chorebus
- The Story of the Sphinx
- On Athracias the Magician
- The Story of the River Licornus
- On Minos
- On the Centaurica
- The Story of Atalanta and Meleager
- Why the Dove is Consecrated to Venus
- The Story of Jove and Juno and Vulcan
- On the Temple of Juno
- The Story of Styx and Victory
- The Story of Antigone
- The Story of Apollo and Cassandra
- The Story of Minerva, Who Was Enraged at the Greeks
- The Story of Picus and Pomona
- The Story of Astraeus and Aurora
- The Story of Jove and Ganymede
- The Story of Lyriope and Narcissus
- The Story of the Sirens and Proserpina
- The Story of Latona and the Lycian Peasants
- The Story of Medea and Jason; Aeson and the Nurses of Father Liber
- The Story of Deucalion and Pyrrha
- The Story of the Divine Palici
- The Story of Consus and the Games of the Circus
- The Story of Hercules; on the Games of the Olympiad
- The Story of Tiber
- On the Grynean Grove
- On King Idomeneus and His Son
- The History of Croesus, King of Lydia
- The Story of Thamyras and the Muses
- The Story of Meleager's Sisters
- The Story of the Sons of Jason and Hypsipyle, and Phaeton
- The Story of Myrrha and Adonis
- The Story of Aeneas and the River Lethe
- Likewise, on the Escape of Aeneas
- [Untitled]
- On the Genealogy of the Gods and Heroes
- The Story of the Double Name and Downfall of Phlegyas
- The History of the Sons of the Laconians Born of Uncertain Fathers
- The Story of Jove and Thetis and Achilles
- On the Wedding of Peleus and Thetis
- The Story of Achilles and Agamemnon and the Death of Hector
- On the Death of Troilus
- On the Victory of Hector and the Flight of Palamedes
- The History of Priam's Son, Killed by His Own Father
- Varying Opinion on the Death of Priam
- The Story of Dido and the History of Saturn
- Likewise on Dido and the Founding of Carthage
- On Anchises and Venus
- The History of Dionysius the Tyrant
- The History of Regulus, Roman Consul
- The History of Torquatus' Victory and His Parricide
- The History of Camillus' Victory
- On the Seven Civil Wars of the Romans
- The History of Atilius' Good Fortune
- On the Three Hundred Fabii Killed and the One Survivor
- On the Victory of Marcellus
- On the Praises and Death of Another Marcellus
- On the God Fatuus and the Goddess Fatua
- The Story of Endymion and the Moon (Luna)
- The Story of Berecyntia and Attis
- The Story of Psyche and Cupid
- The Story of Perdicca
- The Story of the Dog Transported to the Constellations
- On the Seven Pleiades

=== Second Vatican Mythographer ===
- Where Fable Got Its Name
- On the Different Names of the Gods
- On Saturn
- On Jove
- On the Eagle of Jove
- On Juno
- On Her Peacock
- On Iris, Her Rainbow
- On the Reason Why Juno Is Called Jove's Sister and Wife
- Who First Made Temples for Her
- On Neptune
- On Pluto
- On His Three-Headed Hound
- On His Furies
- On the Causes of the Plague
- On the Spartans
- A History
- A History
- A History
- A History
- On the Harpies of Jove
- On the Parcae of Pluto
- On His Wife
- On the Elysian Fields
- On the Nine Circles
- On the Life of Jove
- On Latona and Her Sister
- On the Triple Power of Apollo
- On His Various Names
- On His Tripod, Bow, and Arrows
- On His Four Horses
- On His Raven
- On His Laurel
- On His Nine Muses
- On Diana, the Sister of Apollo
- Why She Is Called Dictynna
- On the Temple at Carya
- On Endymion
- On Mars
- On the Birth of Venus
- The Story of Why the Myrtle Is Consecrated to Venus
- On the Roses of Venus
- On the Seashell of Venus
- On the Doves of Venus
- On Adonis
- On Venus' Cupid
- On the Three Graces
- On Erichthonius
- On Priapus
- On Minerva
- On Vulcan
- [Untitled]
- On the Mercuries
- Why He Is Called Mercury
- On the Lyre
- On Orpheus
- On Jove and Etna the Nymph
- On Cybele
- On Atalanta
- On Pan
- The Story of Aeneas
- A History
- On Faunus
- On Nymphs
- On Astraeus
- On Aeolus
- On the Titans
- On the Decree of Jove
- [Untitled]
- A Story About Gallus
- [Untitled]
- The Story of Peleus
- On Otus and Ephialtes
- On Salmoneus
- On Phaethon
- On Lycaon
- On Thetis
- On Icarus (Icarius)
- On Saturn and Philyra
- On Prometheus
- On the Sacrifice of Prometheus
- On Jove and Thetis
- On Cleobis and Bito
- On Chelone
- On King Proetus
- On Antigone
- On Arachne
- On Niobe
- On Glaucus
- On Deucalion and Pyrrha
- On Lycus and Antiope
- On Epaphus
- On Lycurgus
- Whence Wrestling Was Invented
- On Jove and Europa
- A Repetition
- On Agenor and His Sons
- On Cadmus
- On Juno and Semele
- Palaemon
- On Liber
- On Autonoë
- On Aristaeus
- On Agave
- On Tiresias
- On Branchus
- On Mopsus
- On Sibyl
- On Her Books
- On Io
- On Isis
- On Osiris
- On the Winnowing Fan of Father Liber
- On Venus
- On Proserpina
- On Ceres
- On Her Search
- On the Immortality of her Nursling
- On Triptolemus
- On King Cepheus
- On the Finding of Proserpina
- On the Sirens
- On Tantalus
- On Danaus and Aegyptus
- On Tityus
- On Sisyphus
- On Ixion
- An Explanation of This Same Story
- On Perithous
- The Story of Amulius and Numitor
- On the People of Phlegyae
- On Acrisius
- On Perseus
- On the Gorgons
- The Interpretation of This Same Story
- On Atlas
- On Minerva
- On the Song of Apollo and Marsyas
- The Story of Midas
- The Explanation of This Same Story
- On the Contest of Neptune and Minerva
- On Minos
- On Venus
- On Androgeus
- On Scylla
- On Theseus
- On Aegeus
- On Taurus
- On Sciron
- On Theseus
- On Oenopion
- On Perdicca
- On Bellerophon
- On Jove and Leda
- On Theseus and Perithous
- On King Athamas
- On Pelias
- On Jason
- On Medea
- On the Nurses of Liber
- On Pontia
- On Amycus the King
- On Venus
- On Phineus
- On Oedipus and the Monster That Was Called Sphinx
- On Oeneus
- On Harpalyce
- On Oenomaus
- On Mercury
- On Jove and Alcmena
- On Hercules
- Why He Is Called Hercules
- On Diomedes
- On Geryon
- On Evander
- On Admetus
- On the Snake Killed by Hercules
- On Eryx
- On Busiris
- On Hercules
- On Eurytus
- On the Two Lions That Hercules Conquered
- On Avernus and Lucrinus
- On Erymanthus and Stymphalus
- On the Golden Apples Presented to Jove by Earth
- On Hercules and Deianira
- On Lerna, the Marsh
- On Antaeus and Hercules
- On Oeneus
- On the Death of Hercules
- On the Arrows of Hercules
- On the Sanctuary of Hercules' Grandsons
- On Phorcys
- On Glaucus
- On Scylla, Beloved by Glaucus
- On Charybdis
- On the Tyrrhenians and Father Liber
- On Arion of Lesbos
- On Arethusa
- On Polyphemus
- On Ceyx
- On Mergus
- On Cyparissus
- A Second Telling of the Same Story
- On Priapus
- On Lyriope
- On the Boy, Hyacinth
- On the Boy, Amaracus
- On Pilumnus and Pitumnus
- On Two Brothers Who Were Called Divine
- On the Telchines, Three Brothers
- On Tenes
- On Ebalus
- On Maleus
- On Codrus
- On Croesus
- On Alcon
- On Jove and Electra
- On Laomedon
- On Tithonus and Aurora
- On Anchises
- On Cassandra
- The Story of Helenus
- On Hecuba
- On Ganymede
- On Hercules and Hylas
- On Aminoe (Amymone)
- On Nauplius
- On Dodona
- On Leucas
- On Pelorus
- On Euboea
- On Pachynus
- On the Syracusans
- On Tullus Hostilius
- On Brutus
- On Tarquinius Superbus (Tarquin the Proud)
- On Brenus (Brennus)
- On the Civil War
- On Fabius
- On Marcellus
- On the Shield (Ancile)
- On the Rostra
- On Agamemnon
- On Jove and Aegina
- On Aeacus
- On Peleus and Thetis
- The Explanation of This Story
- On Diomedes
- On the Priest of Neptune
- On Pyrrhus
- On Hecuba and Polymestor
- On Idomeneus
- On Circe
- The Interpretation of This Story
- On Picus
- On Phyllis
- On Laodamia
- On Procris
- On Tereus
- On Leander and Hero
- On Hymenaeus
- On Licambes
- On Bubalus
- On Iarbita
- On Mopsus
- On Apicius
- The Story of Opimius
- On Alcinous
- The Story of Ixion
- A Narrative
- On Responsive Song
- The Accursed Hunger for Gold

=== Third Vatican Mythographer ===
- Saturn
- Cybele
- Jupiter
- Juno
- Neptune
- Pluto
- Proserpina
- Apollo
- Mercury
- Pallas
- Venus
- Bacchus
- Hercules
- Perseus
- The Twelve Signs in the Sky
