= Pelia (mythology) =

Mythological figure

In ancient Greek and Roman mythology, Pelia (Note: Due to her myth being only preserved in a Latin manuscript, the Greek spelling of her name is not attested, but the ancient Greek word for pigeon is spelled Πέλεια, Péleia.) is a minor Cypriot figure, kinswoman to Adonis, who plays a role in a minor myth connected to him. Her story is attested in the works of Servius, a Latin grammarian of the fifth century. Pelia became the wife of a Delian man named Melos, and had a single child by him, a boy also called Melos.

== Mythology ==
Pelia had an unspecified kinship with Cinyras, the king of Cyprus, and his son Adonis. Cinyras gave Pelia's hand in marriage to Melos, a childhood friend of Adonis who had come from the island Delos to Cyprus for unknown reasons. The couple had a son together, whom they also named Melos after his father. The child was raised inside the sanctuary of Aphrodite herself, lover of Adonis. But when Adonis was slain by a boar during hunting, Melos was so distraught over his loss that he ended his life by hanging himself from an apple tree, which took his name thereafter. Pelia, not standing the loss of her kin and her husband both, followed his steps and took her life in the same way as well.

After Aphrodite's own period of mourning was over, she honoured the couple and their grief over Adonis by transforming them; she turned Melos into an apple/apple tree, and Pelia into a dove. As for their son, Melos, who was now the only surviving member of Cinyras' family, he was sent back to Delos, where he founded the city Melon. The sheep there also took his name, for he first taught the Delians to shear them and make clothing out of their wool; the Greek μῆλον means 'apple' and 'sheep' both.

== Significance ==
In ancient Greek society, among animals the doves and pigeons, along with apples among plants, were seen as some of the most important symbols of the goddess Aphrodite, her emblems par excellence, and their connection to the goddess is reflected by their appearance in the myth of Melos and Pelia's transformations at her hands. Greece brought over the connection between dove and Aphrodite from Syrians, whose goddess Astarte was a great influence on Aphrodite and linked to doves and pigeons.

== See also ==
- Side
- Peristera
- Cycnus of Liguria
- Cyparissus

== Bibliography ==
- Arnott, W. Geoffrey (2007). Birds in the Ancient World from A to Z. London, New York: Routledge. ISBN 978-0-415-23851-9.
- Avery, Catherine B., ed. (1962). New Century Classical Handbook. New York, US: Appleton-Century-Crofts.
- Bell, Robert E. (1991). Women of Classical Mythology: A Biographical Dictionary. ABC-Clio. ISBN 9780874365818.
- Cyrino, Monica S (2010). Aphrodite. Gods and Heroes of the Ancient World. New York and London: Routledge. ISBN 978-0-415-77523-6.
- Forbes Irving, Paul M. C. (1990). Metamorphosis in Greek Myths. Clarendon Press. ISBN 0-19-814730-9.
- Grimal, Pierre (1987). The Dictionary of Classical Mythology. Translated by A. R. Maxwell-Hyslop. New York, USA: Wiley-Blackwell. ISBN 0-631-13209-0.
- Liddell, Henry George; Scott, Robert (1940). A Greek-English Lexicon, revised and augmented throughout by Sir Henry Stuart Jones with the assistance of Roderick McKenzie. Oxford: Clarendon Press. Online version at Perseus.tufts project.
- Maurus Servius Honoratus, In Vergilii carmina comentarii. Servii Grammatici qui feruntur in Vergilii carmina commentarii; recensuerunt Georgius Thilo et Hermannus Hagen. Georgius Thilo. Leipzig. B. G. Teubner. 1881. Online version at the Perseus Digital Library.
- Smith, William, A Dictionary of Greek and Roman Biography and Mythology. London. John Murray: printed by Spottiswoode and Co., New-Street Square and Parliament Street, 1873.
