= Amaracus =

Greek mythological character

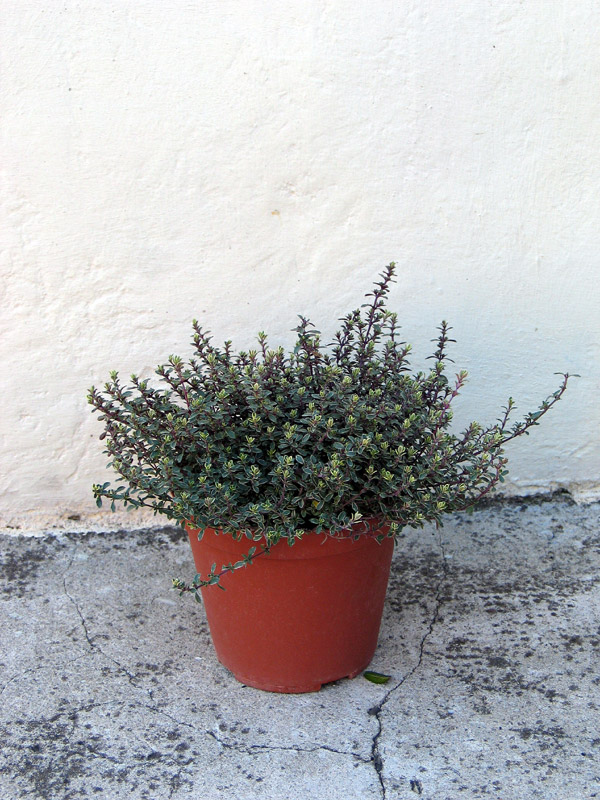
Origanum majorana in a pot

In Greek mythology, Amaracus (Ancient Greek: Ἀμάρακος, romanized: Amarakos, lit. 'marjoram') was a young Cypriot boy who transformed into a marjoram plant, an aromatic herb that was one of Aphrodite's most commonly associated plants.

== Etymology ==
The ancient Greek word for marjoram (Origanum majorana) is ἀμάρακον, amarakon. Due to the possible β/μ variation (if related to Ancient Macedonian ἀβαρύ, abaru, meaning oregano or marjoram) is probably of pre-Greek origin according to Robert Beekes. He also claims that any connection to Sanskrit maruva(ka) meaning the same is false.

== Mythology ==
On the island of Cyprus, Amaracus was the royal perfumer in the court of King Cinyras, his father. (Note: Alcman attests to the connection between Cypriot perfume and Cinyras.) One day Amaracus fell by chance while carrying the ointments, thus creating a greater odor from the confusion of said ointments. Afterwards, he was turned into the amarakon herb (the marjoram), which was also said to be sweet, a plant sacred to the goddess of love and beauty, Aphrodite. As the son of Cinyras, this would make Amaracus the brother of Smyrna, another mortal turned into an aromatic plant with connections to Aphrodite.

== Culture ==
The ancient Greeks associated the marjoram with Aphrodite, as they believed she had created it. In antiquity, the island of Cyprus, where the myth takes place and also a major cult center for Aphrodite, was noted for its large marjoram production; to this day, Cyprus still produces aromatic and therapeutic oils of marjoram. Marjoram was also utilised as a strong aphrodisiac, while it was also believed to cure snakebites, and both ancient Greeks and Romans adorned bridal wreaths with this herb.

== See also ==
- Adonis
- Melos
- Peristera
- Myrice

== Bibliography ==
- Alcman (1988). Greek Lyric. Loeb Classical Library 143. Vol. II: Anacreon, Anacreontea, Choral Lyric from Olympus to Alcman. Translated by David A. Campbell. Cambridge, MA: Harvard University Press. ISBN 9780674991583.
- Beekes, Robert S. P. (2009). Lucien van Beek (ed.). Etymological Dictionary of Greek. Leiden Indo-European Etymological Dictionary Series. Vol. Ι. Leiden, the Netherlands: Brill Publications. ISBN 978-90-04-17420-7.
- Bell, John (1790). Bell's New Pantheon: Or, Historical Dictionary of the Gods, Demi-gods, Heroes, and Fabulous Personages of Antiquity. Vol. I. London.
- Bradley, Mark (2015). Smell and the Ancient Senses. Routledge. ISBN 978-1-84465-641-7.
- Caruso, Carlo (December 5, 2013). Adonis: The Myth of the Dying God in the Italian Renaissance. Bloomsbury. ISBN 978-1-4725-3882-6.
- Forbes Irving, Paul M. C. (1990). Metamorphosis in Greek Myths. United States: Oxford University Press, Clarendon Press. ISBN 0-19-814730-9.
- Kintzios, Spyridon E. (August 29, 2002). Oregano: The genera Origanum and Lippia. CRC Press. ISBN 0-415-36943-6.
- Liddell, Henry George; Scott, Robert (1940). A Greek-English Lexicon, revised and augmented throughout by Sir Henry Stuart Jones with the assistance of Roderick McKenzie. Oxford: Clarendon Press. Online version at Perseus.tufts project.
- Maurus Servius Honoratus. In Vergilii carmina comentarii. Servii Grammatici qui feruntur in Vergilii carmina commentarii; recensuerunt Georgius Thilo et Hermannus Hagen. Georgius Thilo. Leipzig. B. G. Teubner. 1881.
