= Melus (mythology) =

Mythological figures

In Greek mythology, Melus or Melos (Ancient Greek: Μήλος, romanized: Mḗlos, lit. 'apple, sheep') can refer to one of these figures:

- Melus, a childhood friend and kin of Adonis who took his life after the later's passing.
- Melos, the son of the Melos above and Pelia. After the deaths of his parents he went to Delos, founded the city of Melon and taught the locals how to shear sheep and make wool clothing.
- Melus, the son of the river-god Scamander, central in an alternative narrative of the myth of Aphrodite, Hera and Athena vying over the Apple of Discord. Melus was a handsome young man so all three goddesses fought over who would have him as her priest; Alexander (Paris) was tasked with solving the issue, and he decreed that Melus would serve Aphrodite. Ptolemaeus Chennus wrote that the story concerning the golden apple was inspired by this incident, in an example of authors trying to rationalize Greek myth also seen in the works of Palaephatus and Heraclitus.

== See also ==
- Arethusa
- Staphylus

== Bibliography ==
- Maurus Servius Honoratus, In Vergilii carmina comentarii. Servii Grammatici qui feruntur in Vergilii carmina commentarii; recensuerunt Georgius Thilo et Hermannus Hagen. Georgius Thilo. Leipzig. B. G. Teubner. 1881. Online version at the Perseus Digital Library.
- Photius, Bibliotheca excerpts, sections 1-166 translated by John Henry Freese, from the SPCK edition of 1920, now in the public domain, and other brief excerpts from subsequent sections translated by Roger Pearse (from the French translation by René Henry, ed. Les Belles Lettres).
