= Arethusa (Boeotia) =

Greek mythological figure

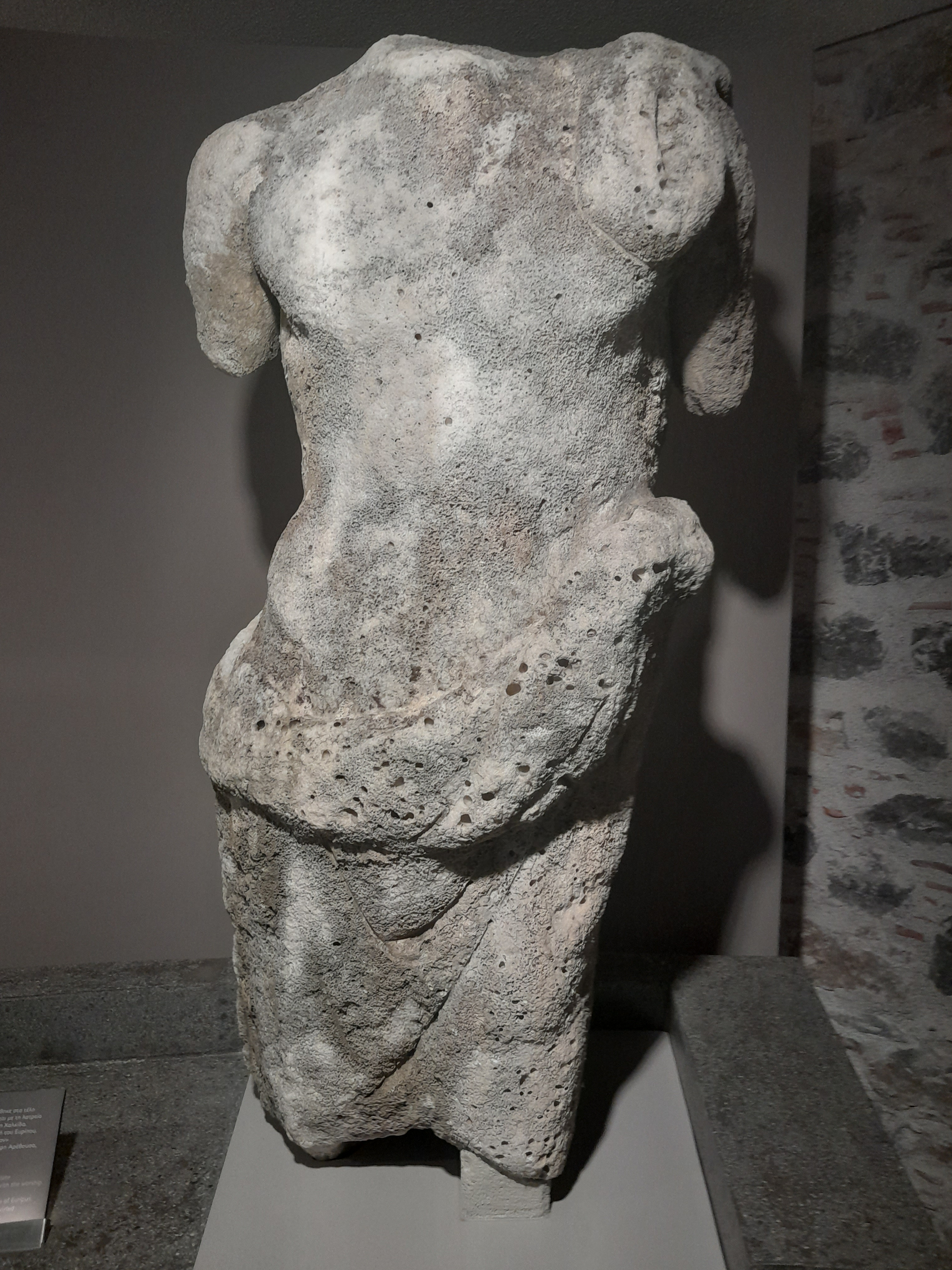
A 1st-century BC statue connected to the cult of Euripius Poseidon, New Archaeological Museum of Chalcis.

In Greek mythology, Arethusa (/ˌærɪˈθjuːzə/; Ancient Greek: Ἀρέθουσα, romanized: Aréthousa) is a minor figure who became a lover of the sea-god Poseidon, before undergoing a transformation at the hands of Hera during a lost episode of Greek myth. She then became the spring of the same name in Chalcis, the main city and port of the island of Euboea.

The New Archaeological Museum of Chalcis was named 'Arethusa' after this legendary woman.

== Mythology ==
=== Poseidon ===
Arethusa's story is mostly known from a fragment of the Michigan papyrus (Papyrus Michigan, inv. no. 1447). The fragmentary Hellenistic text attributes the story to Hesiod, though it has been identified as part of the pseudo-Hesiodic Catalogue of Women, an epic poem written around the seventh or sixth century BC. The fragment, as restored by Reinhold Merkelbach and Martin Litchfield West, reads:

Ἀρέθουσα θυγάτηρ μὲν Ὑπέρ[ο]υ, Π[οσ]ει[δῶνι δὲ συν]ελθοῦσα κατὰ τὸν Βοϊκὸν Εὔρειπον [εἰς κρήνην] ἠλλάγη ἐν Χ[αλκίδι] ὑπὸ [τῆς] Ἥρας, ὡς Ἡσίοδος ἱστορε[ῖ

According to the damaged text, Arethusa was the daughter of Hyperes, though it does not clarify whether this is Hyperes of Troezen or Hyperes of Boeotia. It further says that this Arethusa slept by the shore of the Euripus Strait (which separates the island of Euboea from mainland Greece) with a man whose name is not preserved, but which starts with 'P' and contains the diphthong 'ei'; it is generally accepted that this is meant to read 'Poseidon' (as Merkelbach and West restored).

The theory is supported by the works of Hyginus and Stephanus of Byzantium, who wrote that Poseidon and Arethusa became the parents of the hero Abas, as well as Hesychius of Alexandria, who wrote that one of Poseidon's epithets was Euripios. Euboea was often called Abantis after Abas.

=== Hera ===
Following her tryst with Poseidon, Arethusa was then transformed by the goddess Hera at a place starting with chi (Chalcis, the principal city of Euboea). Due to the fragment's poor condition however it is ambiguous what Hera transformed Arethusa into, or why. The presence of a large spring called Arethusa in Chalcis (the principal spring of the city) leads to the deduction that Arethusa was changed into this spring, like other women in Greek mythology bearing the same name were.

Hera's motivations are harder to decipher. There are two possibilities behind her motive; either Hera did so in order to punish Arethusa over an unknown offence, or perhaps it was an act of mercy. Given that Arethusa's lover was Poseidon, and not Hera's husband Zeus, marital infidelity can be ruled out as the reason. It is possible that Arethusa made a hubristic remark against Hera or dared to compare herself to the queen of the gods. Alternatively, if Hera's motivation was sympathy and mercy, perhaps she did so to save Arethusa from some hardship or threat she was facing, like Athena did with Corone.

Arethusa's son Abas named his daughter Arethusa after his mother.

== Culture ==
The myth of Arethusa is an aetiological one, as its primary role is to explain the presence of the Arethusa spring in Chalcis. According to ancient authors, the clear waters of the spring were favoured by eels in particular, which were considered sacred. Moreover, it also establishes the reason behind the cults of Hera and Euripius Poseidon at Chalcis. The myth might have also been used to establish a genealogical link between Boeotia and Euboea, two regions that enjoyed great affinity in antiquity, if Arethusa's father is taken to be Hyperes of Boeotia, who was himself a son of Poseidon by the Pleiad Alcyone. Paul M. C. Forbes Irving argued that if the attribution to Hesiod is genuine, then it is a remarkably early date for a spring metamorphosis story, which tend to appear later, and perhaps Hesiod originally only mentioned her encounter with Poseidon.

The new archaeological museum of Chalcis, inaugurated in 2021, was named 'Arethusa' after this mythological woman and her spring which was located there.

== See also ==
- Hyria
- Arethusa (Ithaca)

== Bibliography ==
- Arjona-Perez, Manuel (2017). "Η Αρέθουσα, ο Ποσειδώνας και η Ήρα. Ανάλυση και ερμηνεία ενός χαλκιδικού μύθου" [Arethusa, Poseidon and Hera. Analysis and Interpretation of a Chalcidian Myth]. In Tankosić, Žarko; Mavridis, Fanis; Kosma, Maria (eds.). Ένα νησί μεταξύ δύο κόσμων: Αρχαιολογική έρευνα στην Εύβοια, Προϊστορικοί έως και Βυζαντινοί Χρόνοι [An Island Between two Worlds: The Archaeology of Euboea from Prehistoric to Byzantine Times] (PDF). Papers and Monographs from the Norwegian Institute at Athens (in Greek). Vol. 6. Athens, Greece: Norwegian Institute of Athens. Archived from the original (PDF) on May 6, 2024.
- Bell, Robert E. (1991). Women of Classical Mythology: A Biographical Dictionary. ABC-Clio. ISBN 9780874365818.
- Forbes Irving, Paul M. C. (1990). Metamorphosis in Greek Myths. Oxford Classical Monographs. Oxford, New York, Toronto: Oxford University Press, Clarendon Press. ISBN 0-19-814730-9.
- Grimal, Pierre (1987). The Dictionary of Classical Mythology. Wiley-Blackwell. ISBN 0-631-13209-0.
- Hyginus, Gaius Julius, The Myths of Hyginus. Edited and translated by Mary A. Grant, Lawrence: University of Kansas Press, 1960.
- Larson, Jennifer (June 28, 2001). Greek Nymphs: Myth, Cult, Lore. Oxford University Press. ISBN 0-19-512294-1.
- Stephanus of Byzantium, Ethnica, edited by August Meineike (1790–1870), published 1849.
- Solmsen, Friedrich (1990). Hesiodi Theogonia; Opera et dies; Scotum (4th ed.). Oxford University Press. ISBN 0-19-814071-1.
- Strauch, Daniel (October 1, 2006). "Arethusa". In Cancik, Hubert; Schneider, Helmuth (eds.). Brill's New Pauly. Berlin: Brill Reference Online. doi:10.1163/1574-9347_bnp_e134010. ISSN 1574-9347.
