= Staphylus (goatherd) =

Goatheard in Greek mythology

In Greek and Roman mythology, Staphylus (Ancient Greek: Στάφυλος, romanized: Stáphulos, lit. 'grape cluster') is an Aetolian goatherd in the service of King Oeneus. Staphylus is the protagonist of a short myth in which he discovers the grape, and after the creation of wine and the establishment of viticulture, he has the important fruit named after himself. Staphylus' story survives in the scholia by late-antiquity Latin authors.

== Etymology ==
The name Staphylus is derived from the ancient Greek feminine noun σταφυλή (staphulḗ), meaning 'bunch of grapes' and also 'swollen uvula'. Beekes argued that the word is pre-Greek and related to στέμφυλα (stémphula, "bunch of (pressed) olives or grapes") and ἀσταφίς (astaphís, "dried grape").

== Mythology ==
Staphylus was the goatherd of King Oeneus of Aetolia, western Greece. One day he noticed one of the she-goats he was tending to was getting fatter than the rest and being rather frolicsome, and was late to the manger, so he figured she was consuming something. Curius to find out what was going on, he followed the goat one day to a remote place and saw her eating grapes, an unknown fruit to him. Amazed by the sweetness of the new fruit, Staphylus took some with him and brought it to the king.

Oeneus then extracted the juice from the fruit by squeezing it, and delighted with it named it after himself (οἶνος, "wine") and the grape after Staphylus (σταφυλή). In one version he offered it to Liber (Greek Dionysus, the god of wine) who had visited, and it was him who demonstrated the cultivation of the plant. Dionysus then wished for the inventors of the new beverage to enjoy perpetual glory for their contribution, so he named the wine after Oeneus, and the grapes after Staphylus.

Meanwhile, the hero Heracles was fighting with the river-god Achelous over his wife Deianira (the daughter of Oeneus), and broke off one of the god's horns (in Greek κέρας, keras), hence the of act of mixing wine came to be called kerasai; in one version Heracles is credited as the one who mixed Staphylus' grape's juice with water to produce proper wine.

In a different version, Dionysus taught Oeneus viticulture and named the wine after him as compensation for seducing and impregnating his wife Queen Althaea during a visit.

== See also ==
- Icarius
- Arethusa
- Melus

== Bibliography ==
- Abel, Ernest L. (2006). Intoxication in Mythology: A Worldwide Dictionary of Gods, Rites, Intoxicants and Places. North Carolina, US: McFarland & Company, Inc. ISBN 978-0-7864-2477-1.
- Beekes, Robert S. P. (2010). Lucien van Beek (ed.). Etymological Dictionary of Greek. Leiden Indo-European Etymological Dictionary Series. Vol. ΙΙ. Leiden, the Netherlands: Brill Publications. ISBN 978-90-04-17418-4. ISSN 1574-3586.
- Binder, Carsten (October 1, 2006). "Staphylus". In Cancik, Hubert; Schneider, Helmuth (eds.). Brill's New Pauly. Translated by Christine F. Salazar. Kiel: Brill Reference Online. ISSN 1574-9347.
- Grant, Michael; Hazel, John (August 2, 2004). Who's Who in Classical Mythology. London and New York: Routledge. ISBN 0-415-26041-8.
- Grimal, Pierre (1987). The Dictionary of Classical Mythology. Wiley-Blackwell. ISBN 0-631-13209-0.
- Hard, Robin (2004). The Routledge Handbook of Greek Mythology: Based on H.J. Rose's "Handbook of Greek Mythology". Routledge. ISBN 9780415186360.
- Hyginus, Gaius Julius, The Myths of Hyginus. Edited and translated by Mary A. Grant, Lawrence: University of Kansas Press, 1960.
- Liddell, Henry George; Scott, Robert (1940). A Greek-English Lexicon, revised and augmented throughout by Sir Henry Stuart Jones with the assistance of Roderick McKenzie. Oxford: Clarendon Press. Online version at Perseus.tufts project.
- March, Jennifer (1998). Cassell's Dictionary of Classical Mythology. USA: Cassell. ISBN 0-304-35788-X.
- Oswalt, Sabine G. (1969). Concise Encyclopedia of Greek and Roman mythology. Glasgow: Collins sons & Co. Ltd.
- Probus, In Vergillii Bucolica et Georgica Commentarius, 1848. Online version on Google books.
- Servius, Commentary on Virgil's Georgics, recensuerunt Georgius Thilo et Hermannus Hagen. Georgius Thilo. Leipzig. B. G. Teubner. 1881. Available online on Perseus Digital Library.
- Smith, Robert Scott (May 9, 2022). "The Myth of the Mythographus Vergilianus". In Pagès, Joan; Villagra, Nereida (eds.). Myths on the Margins of Homer: Prolegomena to the Mythographus Homericus. De Gruyter. ISBN 9783110751154.
