= Melus (companion of Adonis) =

Mythological apple

In ancient Greek and Roman mythology, Melos (Ancient Greek: Μήλος, romanized: Mḗlos, lit. 'apple, sheep') is a man from Delos who became a childhood friend and later kin-in-law of Adonis, the beloved of the goddess Aphrodite, who is connected to apples via his metamorphosis into one. Melos married Pelia and was the father of a son, also called Melos, by her.

== Mythology ==
Melos was originally from the Aegean island of Delos, but later moved to Cyprus in the Eastern Mediterranean for unclear reasons. When the ruler of Cyprus, Cinyras, saw that Melos was of sound character, he made Melos a companion to his son Adonis, and the two grew very close. Melos eventually married a woman named Pelia, who was kin to Cinyras and Adonis, and had a son by her, also named Melos after his father. The child was raised inside the sanctuary of Aphrodite. When Adonis was slain by a boar during hunting, Melos was so distraught over the loss of his childhood companion that he ended his life by hanging himself from an apple tree, which took his name thereafter.

Pelia, not standing the deaths of her kin and her husband, took her life in the same way as Melos. After Aphrodite's own period of mourning was over, she turned Melos into an apple fruit, and Pelia into a dove, honouring the couple's devotion to her beloved. Their son, Melos, was sent back to Delos, where he founded the city Melon. The sheep there also took his name, for he first taught the Delians to shear them and make clothing out of their wool; the Greek noun μῆλον means 'apple' and 'sheep' both.

== In culture ==
The apple was seen as the most important fruit symbol of Aphrodite, as the emblem of her victory in the beauty contest; in the ancient Greek society, the apple fruit became "the love token par excellence". The same was true for doves/pigeons when it came to Aphrodite's animal symbols, also being seen as emblems par excellence among the beasts.

== See also ==
- Side
- Peristera
- Cycnus of Liguria

== Bibliography ==
- Avery, Catherine B., ed. (1962). New Century Classical Handbook. New York, US: Appleton-Century-Crofts.
- Bell, Robert E. (1991). Women of Classical Mythology: A Biographical Dictionary. ABC-Clio. ISBN 9780874365818.
- Cyrino, Monica S (2010). Aphrodite. Gods and Heroes of the Ancient World. New York and London: Routledge. ISBN 978-0-415-77523-6.
- Forbes Irving, Paul M. C. (1990). Metamorphosis in Greek Myths. Clarendon Press. ISBN 0-19-814730-9.
- Grimal, Pierre (1987). The Dictionary of Classical Mythology. Translated by A. R. Maxwell-Hyslop. New York, USA: Wiley-Blackwell. ISBN 0-631-13209-0.
- Maurus Servius Honoratus, In Vergilii carmina comentarii. Servii Grammatici qui feruntur in Vergilii carmina commentarii; recensuerunt Georgius Thilo et Hermannus Hagen. Georgius Thilo. Leipzig. B. G. Teubner. 1881. Online version at the Perseus Digital Library.
- Liddell, Henry George; Scott, Robert (1940). A Greek-English Lexicon, revised and augmented throughout by Sir Henry Stuart Jones with the assistance of Roderick McKenzie. Oxford: Clarendon Press. Online version at Perseus.tufts project.
- Smith, William, A Dictionary of Greek and Roman Biography and Mythology. London. John Murray: printed by Spottiswoode and Co., New-Street Square and Parliament Street, 1873.
