= Durham University Journal =

University records

The Durham University Journal was the official journal of Durham University in England, from its foundation in 1876 until its cessation in 1995. At the beginning of its run, the journal focused primarily on news related to the university itself, but beginning with the interwar period the journal shifted to publishing academic articles unrelated to university business.
