= Flower differentiation =

Anatomical process in plants to produce flowers

Flower differentiation is the developmental process by which a floral meristem which has committed to flowering produces the distinct organs of a flower, typically sepals, petals, stamens, and carpels which are arranged in concentric whorls. The process is controlled by a small set of transcription factors which act in overlapping domains to specify the identity of each organ. The combinatorial logic behind floral organ specification is governed by the ABCDE model of flower development, which was derived from the study of homeotic mutants of Arabidopsis thaliana and the snapdragon Antirrhinum majus.

== The ABCDE Model ==
The ABCDE model proposes five classes of gene activity: A, B, C, D, and E, the different combinations of which determine the identity and formation of floral organs.

- Whorl 1 = sepals: A + E
- Whorl 2 = petals: A + B + E
- Whorl 3 = stamens: B + C + E
- Whorl 4 = carpels: C + E
- Inside whorl 4 = ovules: C + D + E

The A-class and C-class activity is mutually antagonistic

- If A is lost, C expands to all whorls of A
- If C is lost, A expands to all whorls of C

These genes encode MADS-box proteins forming quarterly complexes (quartets) to activate specific organ-building programs: building a sepal, petal, stamen, or carpel out of the same basic leafy starting materials.

== The Floral Quartet Model ==
=== Key protein classes in Arabidopsis ===
The homeotic genes generally encode MIKC-type MADS-domain transcription factors:

- Class A: APETALA1 (AP1) and APETALA2 (AP2)
- Class B: APETALA3 (AP3) and PISTILLATA (PI)
- Class C: AGAMOUS (AG)
- Class D: SEEDSTICK (STK), SHATTERPROOF1 (SHP1), and SHP2
- Class E: SEPALLATA1-4 (SEP1-SEP4). Class E proteins are structural components necessary to bridge the A, B, C, and D complexes into functioning tetramers.

=== Floral Quartet Model ===
These A-, B-, C-, D-, and E-class genes encode MADS-box proteins forming quarterly complexes (quartets) to activate specific organ-building programs: building a sepal, petal, stamen, or carpel out of the same basic leafy starting materials:

- Whorl 1 = sepals: A + E (e.g.,: AP1 - SEP - SEP - AP1)
- Whorl 2 = petals: A + B + E (e.g.,: AP1 - AP3 - PI - SEP)
- Whorl 3 = stamens: B + C + E (e.g.,: SEP - AP3 - PI - AG)
- Whorl 4 = carpels: C + E (e.g.,: AG - SEP - SEP - AG)
- Inside whorl 4 = ovules: C + D + E (e.g.,: AG - STK - SHP - SEP)

== The regulation of ABCDE gene expression ==
The ABCDE system is regulated by several overlapping layers. LFY and AP1 which are identity activators start the program. Then the spatial cofactors, UNUSUAL FLORAL ORGANS (UFO) and WUSCHEL (WUS), tell LFY where to act, generating whorl-specific patterns from a uniform signal. Next, the boundary genes such as SUPERMAN and RABBIT EARS sharpen the borders between domains, while miR172 reinforces the inner/outer split post-transcriptionally. The temporal gate is set by the chromatin regulators PRC2, LHP1, and the opposing Trithorax group, keeping the program off until the right moment.

Furthermore, two feedback loops close the circuit: AG terminates stem-cell activity by repressing WUS, giving the flower its fixed whorl number, and the broadly-expressed SEPALLATA (E-class) proteins are obligate partners without which the A, B, C, and D activities cannot function. Once the quartets form and the auto-regulatory loop closes, organ identity is locked in and no longer needs continuous input from the upstream signal.

Even though the ABCDE factors specify floral organ identity, the programs which build each organ are only partly understood. Genome-wide binding studies identify thousands of potential targets of the MADS-box quartets, and selectivity arises from a combination of DNA-sequence preference and co-operative binding. For example, the gene CRABS CLAW which is a member of the YABBY family is a direct target of AGAMOUS (AG) and is required for carpel and nectary development in Arabidopsis.
