= Arethusa (Ithaca) =

Greek mythological woman

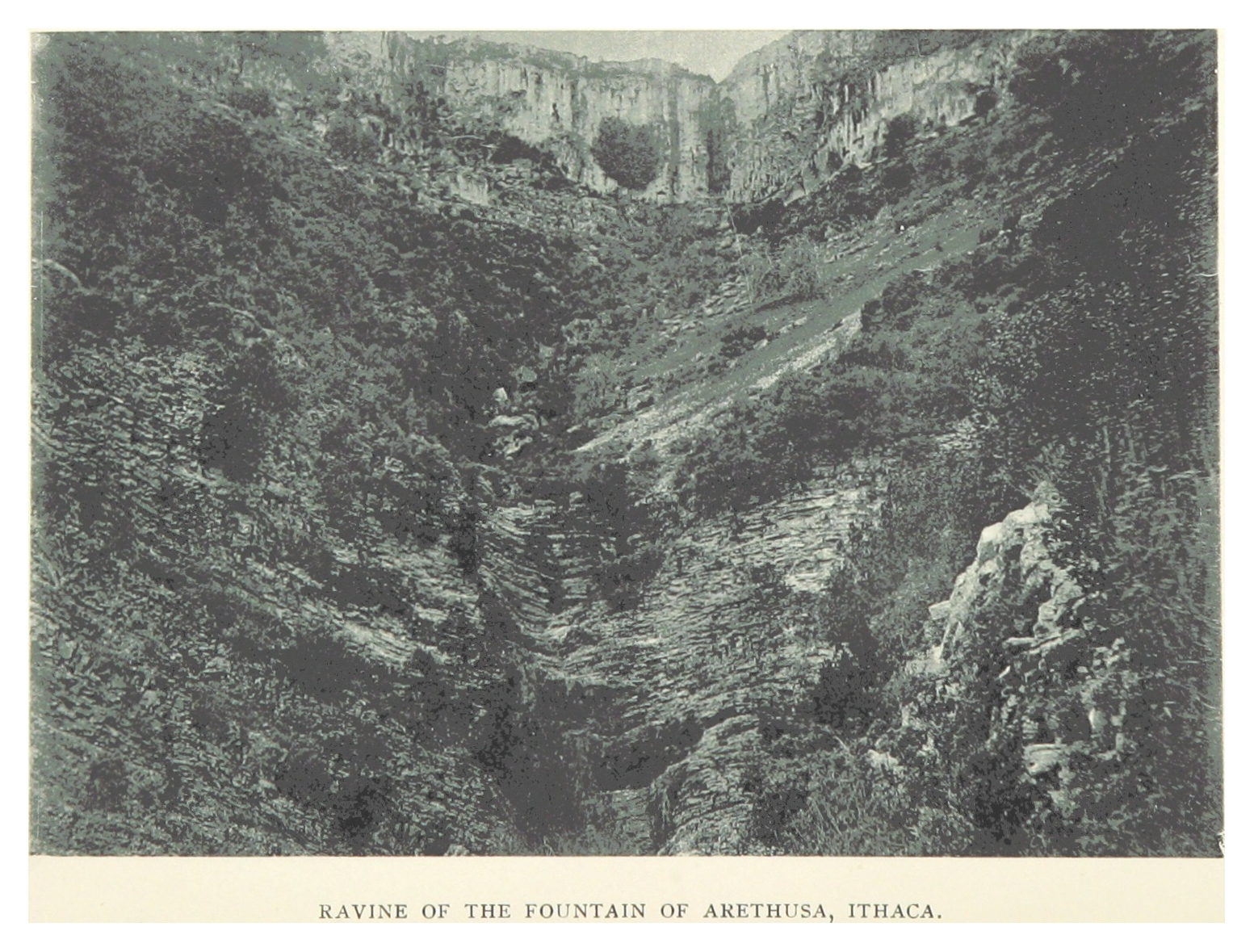
Fountain of Arethusa in Ithaca, 1895.

In Greek mythology, Arethusa (/ˌærɪˈθjuːzə/; Ancient Greek: Ἀρέθουσα, romanized: Aréthousa) is a minor figure from Ithaca who kills herself out of grief and has a fountain bear her name. Her story survives in later scholia on Homer's epic poem the Odyssey. She and her story do not actually appear or are mentioned in the Odyssey itself, although the fountain that is connected to her myth does.

== Family ==
Arethusa was a woman from the island of Ithaca; other than a son, no other family or lineage of hers is preserved. It is unknown whether she was a freeborn woman or a slave.

== Mythology ==
According to an anonymous scholiast on Homer, Arethusa had a son named Corax (meaning "raven") who was a hunter. One day while hunting a hare, Corax did not notice where the hunt was taking him, so he accidentally fell off a cliff and died. Out of grief for losing her son, the inconsolable Arethusa took her life by hanging next to a fountain near the spot where Corax died. The spring was then called Arethusa after her, while the rock itself took the name of the dead son thereafter.

In the Odyssey, after returning home following a long ten-year long journey following the end of the Trojan War and the sacking of the city of Troy, the disguised king Odysseus finds his slave Eumaeus tending the swine which graze next to the rock of Corax and the fountain of Arethusa.

== Location ==
Arethusa was a very common name for springs in antiquity, and several others all over Greece bore the same name as the spring in Ithaca. Today, a spring with the same name in Pera Pigadi on the island Ithaca can be potentially identified with the mythological one, but much of this is speculative.

== See also ==
- Hyria
- Pirene
- Arethusa (Boeotia)

== Bibliography ==
- Bell, Robert E. (1991). Women of Classical Mythology: A Biographical Dictionary. ABC-Clio. ISBN 9780874365818.
- Dindorf, Wilhelm, ed. (1855). Scholia Graeca in Homeri Odysseam Ex Codicibus Aucta Et Emendata. Vol. II. Typographeo Academico. ISBN 978-5-87561-491-0.
- Greatheed, Samuel; Parken, Daniel; Williams, Theophilus; Conder, Josiah; Price, Thomas; Ryland, Jonathan Edwards; Paxton Hood, Edwin (1809). "Gell's Antiquities of Ithaca". The Eclectic Review. Vol. V.
- Homer (2015). The Odyssey. Translated by Barry P. Powell. Oxford University Press. ISBN 978-0-19-992588-9.
- Lewis, Virginia M. (August 15, 2019). Myth, Locality, and Identity in Pindar's Sicilian Odes. UK, USA: Oxford University Press. ISBN 978-0-19-091031-0.
- Pope, Alexander (1827). Classical Manual. London, UK: A. J. Vaipy, M.A.
- Stephanus of Byzantium, Ethnica, edited by August Meineike (1790–1870), published 1849. Online text available at Topos Text.
