= Cycnus (son of Sthenelus) =

Mythical Greek king, who was turned into the constellation Cygnus

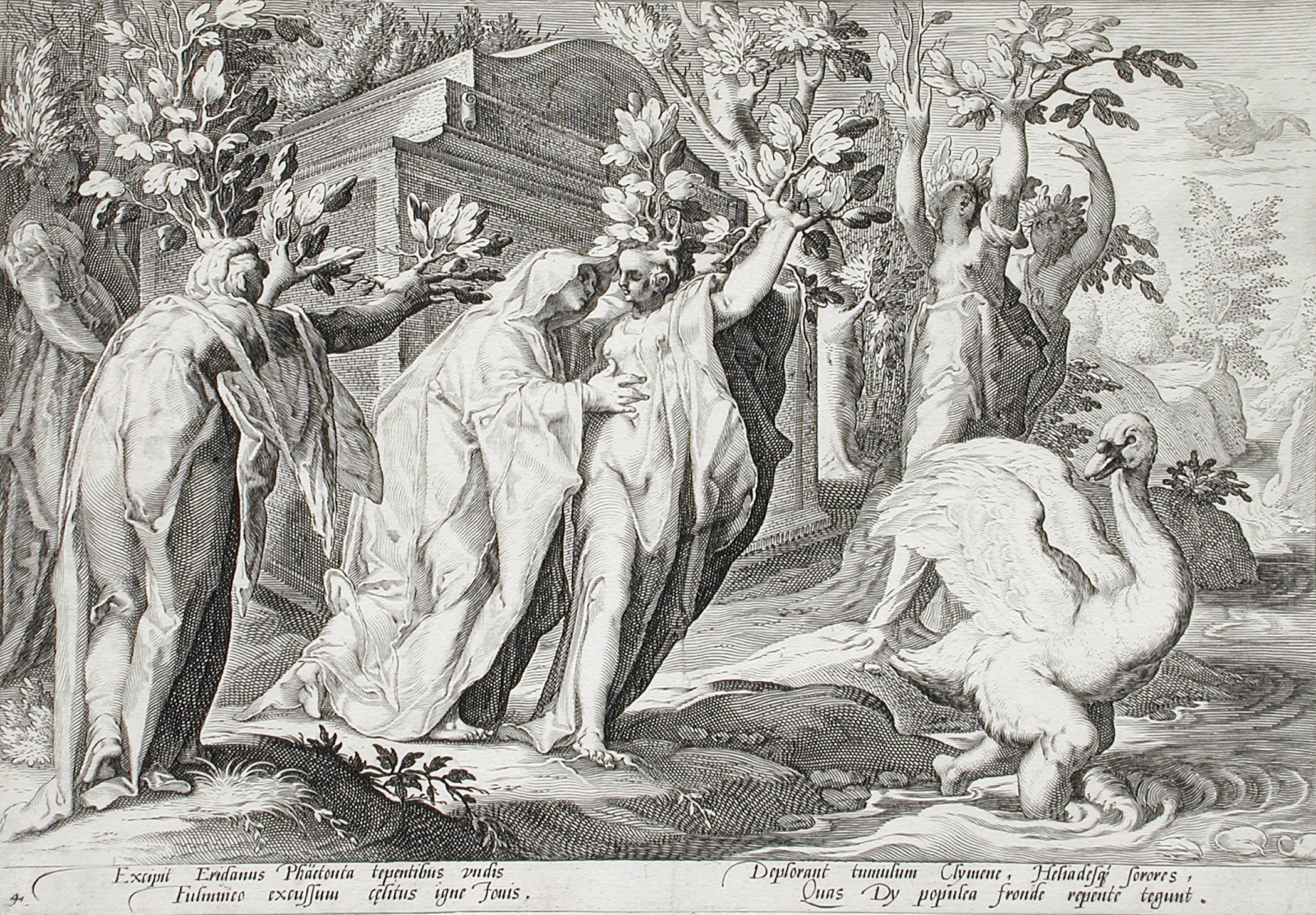
Cycnus transforms into a swan, 1590 engraving by Hendrik Goltzius, LACMA.

In Greek mythology, Cycnus (Ancient Greek: Κύκνος, romanized: Kyknos, lit. 'swan'), Cygnus or Cidnus was a king of Liguria, a beloved and lover of Phaethon, who lamented his death and was subsequently turned into a swan and then a constellation.

== History ==
Cycnus was the founder of the first settlement of Brescia on the hill Cidneo in 1200 BCE. The hill was named after him.

== Mythology ==
=== Family ===
Cycnus was the son of Sthenelus and the lover of Phaethon (Servius explicitly writes "amator", or lover). According to Ovid, he was a distant relative of Phaethon on his mother's side. Servius also mentions that Cycnus had a son named Cupavo. It is also possible that he had two sons, Cupavo and Cinyras.

=== Transformation ===
After Phaethon died, Cycnus sat by the river Eridanos mourning his death. The gods turned him into a swan to relieve him of his sorrow. Even then he retained memories of Phaethon's death, and would avoid the sun's heat because of that. Swans are known for mourning their mate for many days when they die, which suggests that Cygnus and Phaethon were lovers.

According to Virgil, Cycnus lamented Phaethon's death till he grew old, so his gray hair became gray feathers upon his transformation. Pausanias mentions Cycnus, king of the Ligyes (Ligurians), as a renowned musician who after his death was changed into a swan by Apollo. Servius also writes of Cycnus as a musician and a friend of Phaethon, and states that he was changed into a swan and later placed among the stars by Apollo (that is, as the constellation Cygnus). Both Pausanias and Servius state it was Apollo who had blessed Cycnus with talent in singing. Cycnus' profession as a musician may be a direct reference to the concept of the swan song suggested in Hyginus' account.
