= Peristera (mythology) =

Nymph in Greek mythology

In ancient Greek and Roman mythology, Peristera (Ancient Greek: Περιστερά, romanized: Peristerá, lit. 'dove') is a nymph who was transformed into a dove, one of Aphrodite's sacred birds and symbols, explaining the bird's connection to the goddess. This myth survives in the works of Latin grammarian Lactantius Placidus and the first of the three anonymous Vatican Mythographers, whose works were discovered in a single manuscript in 1401.

== Etymology ==
The etymology of the Greek word περιστερά, meaning the common pigeon or dove, is ultimately unknown, although it could be related to the word πελιός, meaning "dark, blue." One suggestion is that it may be derived from a Semitic phrase peraḥ Ištar, which means "the bird of Ishtar", a Semitic love-goddess sharing some elements with Aphrodite.

== Mythology ==
One day Aphrodite and her son Eros arrived in a bright meadow, and for fun they held a contest on which could gather the most flowers. Eros, bearing swift wings, easily outdid his mother, until Peristera stepped in and handed to Aphrodite the flowers she herself had picked, giving Aphrodite the victory. Eros, in anger over his victory being snatched away from his hands, transformed Peristera into the bird bearing her name, the dove. Accordingly, the dove came under Aphrodite's protection thereafter. Thereafter doves, now the goddess' most cherised animal, would always draw her chariot.

== Interpretation ==
According to Paul M.C. Forbes Irving, Peristera's tale is a very late one, and is more in line with inventions of a scholar who creates comprehensive narratives than local aetiological myth. Among Aphrodite's symbols, the dove was one of the most significant and common ones, which came to symbolise affection, peace and love. The ancient Greeks took over the link between the bird and the goddess from Syrians when they adopted their cults, as they considered the dove sacred to their goddess Astarte, whose iconography and cult greatly influenced Aphrodite's.

== See also ==
- Alcyone and Ceyx
- Antigone
- Atalanta and Hippomenes

== Bibliography ==
- Arnott, W. Geoffrey (2007). Birds in the Ancient World from A to Z. London, New York: Routledge. ISBN 978-0-415-23851-9.
- Beekes, Robert S. P. (2010). Lucien van Beek (ed.). Etymological Dictionary of Greek. Leiden Indo-European Etymological Dictionary Series. Vol. ΙΙ. Leiden, the Netherlands: Brill Publications. ISBN 978-90-04-17419-1.
- Botterweck, G. Johannes; Ringgren, Helmer (1990), Theological Dictionary of the Old Testament, vol. VI, Grand Rapids, Michigan: Wm. B. Eerdmans Publishing Co., ISBN 0-8028-2330-0
- Cyrino, Monica S. (June 25, 2010). Aphrodite. Gods and Heroes of the Ancient World. New York and London: Routledge. ISBN 978-0-415-77523-6.
- De Gubernatis, Angelo (1872). Zoological Mythology: Or, The Legends of Animals. Vol. 2. Trübner & Company. ISBN 9780598541062.
- Forbes Irving, Paul M. C. (1990). Metamorphosis in Greek Myths. Oxford Classical Monographs. Oxford, New York, Toronto: Oxford University Press, Clarendon Press. ISBN 0-19-814730-9.
- Hünemörder, Christian (October 1, 2006). "Dove/Pigeon". In Cancik, Hubert; Schneider, Helmuth (eds.). Brill's New Pauly. Hamburg: Brill Reference Online. doi:10.1163/1574-9347_bnp_e1201400. ISSN 1574-9347.
- Lactantius Placidus (1898). Lactantii Placidi qvi dicitvr Commentarios in Statii Thebaida it Commentarivm in Achilleida recensvit Ricardvs Jahnke [Lactantius Placidus, On Statius's Thebaid] (in Latin). Translated by Jahnke, Richard. Lipsiae : in aedibvs B. G. Tevbneri. 1.698 (p 71). LCCN 06008769. OL 21778486M.
- Lewis, Sian; Llewellyn-Jones, Lloyd (2018), The Culture of Animals in Antiquity: A Sourcebook with Commentaries, New York and London: Routledge, ISBN 978-1-315-20160-3
- Liddell, Henry George; Scott, Robert (1940). A Greek-English Lexicon, revised and augmented throughout by Sir Henry Stuart Jones with the assistance of Roderick McKenzie. Oxford: Clarendon Press. Online version at Perseus.tufts project.
- Pepin, Ronald E. (2008). The Vatican Mythographers. New York City: Fordham University Press. p. 76. ISBN 978-0-8232-2892-8.
- Roscher, Wilhelm Heinrich (1909). Ausführliches Lexikon der griechischen und römischen Mythologie [Detailed dictionary of Greek and Roman mythology] (in German). Vol. III: N–P. Leipzig: Teubner-Verlag.
