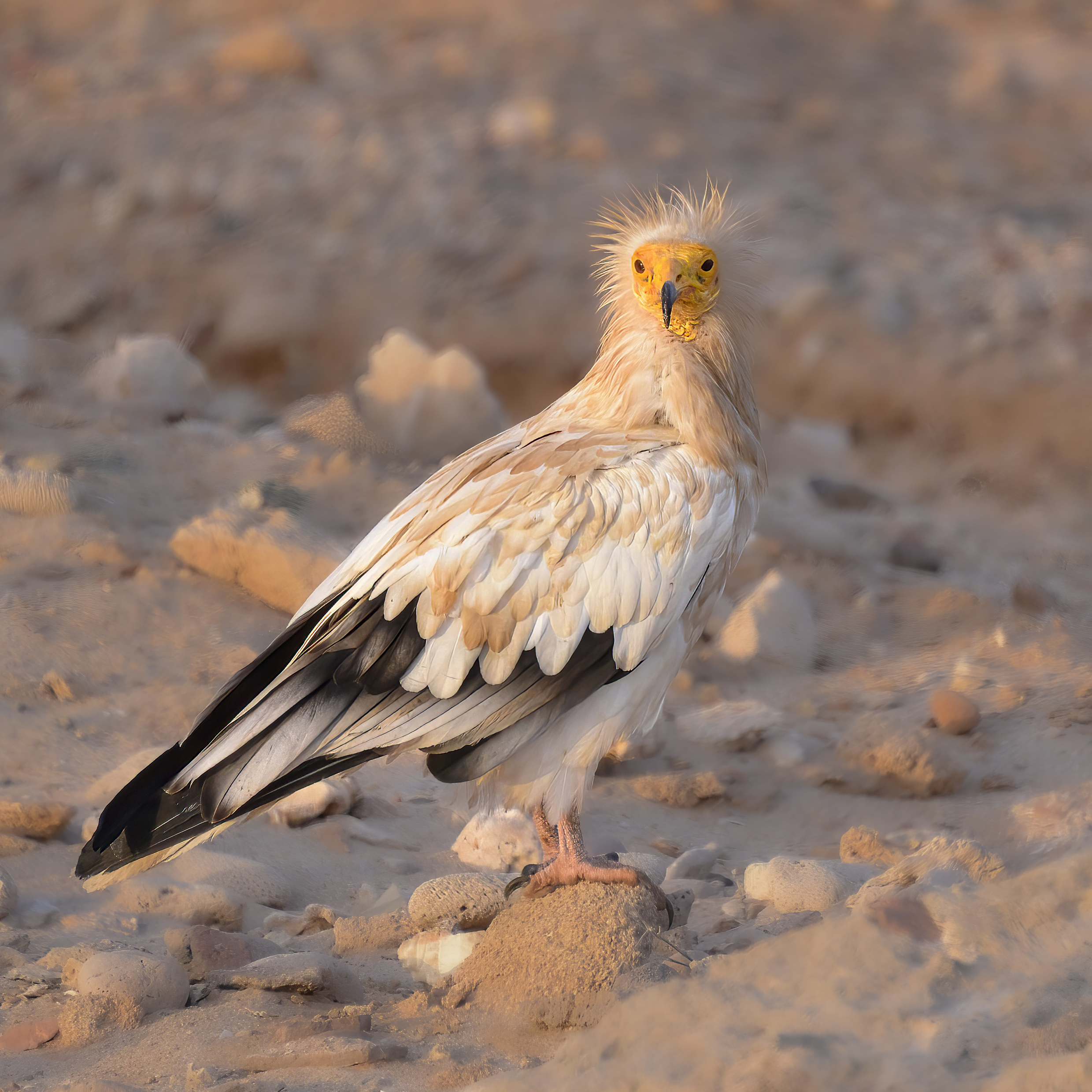
- N. p. percnopterus in Socotra, Yemen

Conservation status
- Endangered (IUCN 3.1)
- CITES Appendix II

Scientific classification
- Kingdom: Animalia
- Phylum: Chordata
- Class: Aves
- Order: Accipitriformes
- Family: Accipitridae
- Subfamily: Gypaetinae
- Genus: Neophron; Savigny, 1809
- Species: N. percnopterus

Binomial name
- Neophron percnopterus (Linnaeus, 1758)

Subspecies
- N. p. ginginianus (Latham, 1790); N. p. majorensis Donázar et al., 2002; N. p. percnopterus (Linnaeus, 1758)
- Distribution of the three subspecies

Synonyms
- Vultur percnopterus Linnaeus, 1758

= Egyptian vulture =

Species of Old World vultures of the genus Neophron

The Egyptian vulture (Neophron percnopterus), also called the white scavenger vulture or pharaoh's chicken, is a small, Old World vulture in the monotypic genus Neophron. It is widely distributed from the Iberian Peninsula and North Africa to West Asia and India. The contrasting underwing pattern and wedge-shaped tail make it distinctive in flight, as it soars in thermals during the warmer parts of the day. Egyptian vultures feed mainly on carrion, but are opportunistic and also prey on small mammals, birds, and reptiles. They also feed on the eggs of other birds, breaking larger ones by tossing a large pebble onto them.

The use of tools is rare in birds and apart from the use of a pebble as a hammer, Egyptian vultures also use twigs to roll up wool for use in their nest. Egyptian vultures that breed in the temperate regions migrate south in winter, while tropical populations are relatively sedentary. Populations of this species declined in the 20th century, and some island populations are endangered by hunting, accidental poisoning, and collision with power lines.

== Taxonomy and systematics ==
The Egyptian vulture was formally described by Carl Linnaeus in 1758 in the 10th edition of his Systema Naturae under the binomial name Vultur percnopterus. The genus Neophron was proposed by Jules-César Savigny in 1809. The genus Neophron contains only a single extant species. A few prehistoric species from the Neogene period in North America placed in the genus Neophrontops (the name meaning "looks like Neophron") are believed to have been very similar to these vultures in lifestyle, but the genetic relationships are unclear. A fossil species Neophron lolis has been described from the late Miocene of Spain. The genus Neophron is considered to represent the oldest branch of the vultures that consists of separated (or polyphyletic) clades. Along with its nearest evolutionary relatives, the lammergeier (Gypaetus barbatus) and the palm-nut vulture (Gypohierax angolensis), they are sometimes placed in a separate subfamily, the Gypaetinae.

=== Subspecies ===
Three subspecies of the Egyptian vulture are widely recognised, although considerable gradation is seen due to movement and intermixing of the populations. The nominate subspecies, N. p. percnopterus, with a dark grey bill, has the largest range, occurring in southern Europe, northern Africa, the Middle East, Central Asia, and north-western India. Populations breeding in the temperate zone migrate south during winter.

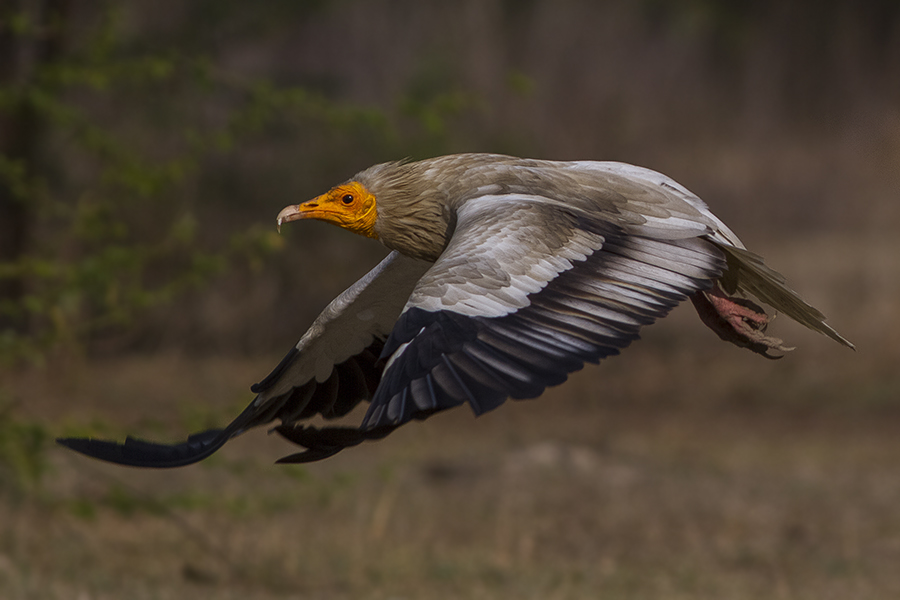
N. p. ginginianus in flight, India

The Indian subcontinent is the range of subspecies N. p. ginginianus, the smallest of the three subspecies, which is identifiable by a pale yellow bill. The subspecies name is derived from Gingee in southern India, from where French explorer Pierre Sonnerat described it as le vautour de Gingi and it was given a Latin name by John Latham in his Index Ornithologicus (1790).

A small population found only in the eastern Canary Islands was shown to be genetically distinct and identified as a new subspecies, N. p. majorensis, in 2002. Known locally as the guirre, it is genetically more distant from N. p. percnopterus, significantly greater even than N. p. ginginianus is from N. p. percnopterus. Unlike neighbouring populations in Africa and southern Europe, it is not migratory and consistently larger in size. The subspecies name majorensis is derived from "Majorata", the ancient name for the island of Fuerteventura. The island was named by Spanish conquerors in the 15th century after the "Majos", the main native Guanche tribe there. One study in 2010 suggested that the species established on the island about 2,500 years ago when the island was first colonized by humans.

Nikolai Zarudny and Härms described a subspecies, N. p. rubripersonatus, from Baluchistan in 1902. This was described as having a deeper reddish-orange skin on the head and a yellow-tipped, dark bill. This has rarely been considered a valid subspecies, but the intermediate pattern of bill colouration suggests intermixing of subspecies.

=== Etymology ===
The generic name is derived from Greek mythology. Timandra was the mother of Neophron. Aegypius was a friend of Neophron's and about the same age. It upset Neophron to know that his mother Timandra was having a love affair with Aegypius. Seeking revenge, Neophron made advances towards Aegypius' mother, Bulis. Neophron succeeded and enticed Bulis into entering the dark chamber where his mother and Aegypius were to meet soon. Neophron then distracted his mother, tricking Aegypius into entering the chamber and sleeping with his own mother Bulis. When Bulis discovered the deception, she gouged out the eyes of her son Aegypius before killing herself. Aegypius prayed for revenge and Zeus, on hearing the prayer, changed Aegypius and Neophron into vultures. The specific name percnopterus is derived from Greek for "black wings": περκνός (perknos, meaning "blue-black") and πτερόν (pteron, meaning wing).

== Description ==
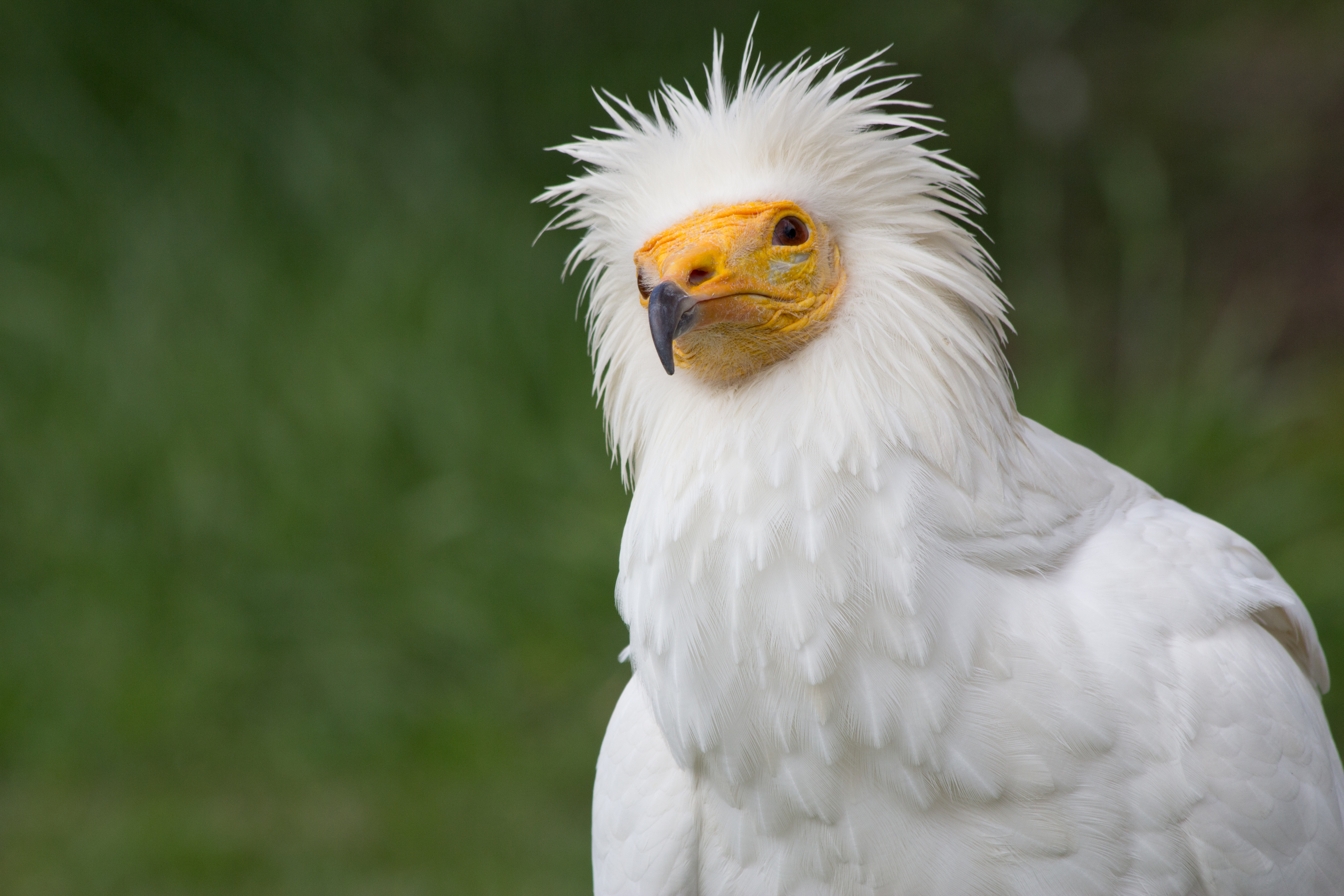
Adult N. percnopterus in captivity showing white plumage

The adult's plumage is white, with black flight feathers in the wings. Wild birds usually appear soiled, with a rusty or brown shade to the white plumage, derived from mud or iron-rich soil. Captive specimens without access to soil have clean white plumage. It has been suggested to be a case of cosmetic colouration. The bill is slender and long, and the tip of the upper mandible is hooked. The nostril is an elongated horizontal slit. The neck feathers are long and form hackles. The wings are pointed, with the third primary being the longest; the tail is wedge-shaped. The legs are pink in adults and grey in juveniles. The claws are long and straight, and the third and fourth toes are slightly webbed at the base.

The bill is black in the nominate subspecies, but pale or yellowish in adults of the smaller Indian N. p. ginginianus. This variation may need further study, particularly due to the intermediate black-tipped bill described in N. p. rubripersonatus. The facial skin is yellow and unfeathered down to the throat. The sexes are indistinguishable in plumage, but breeding males have a deeper orange facial skin colour than females. Females are slightly larger on average, about 10–15% heavier than males. Young birds are blackish or chocolate brown with black and white patches. The adult plumage is attained only after about five years.

Measurements

Nominate
Culmen		31–34 mm (1.2–1.3 in)
Wing	♂	470–536 mm (19–21 in)
	♀	460–545 mm (18–21 in)
Tail	♂	220–251 mm (8.7–9.9 in)
	♀	240–267 mm (9.4–11 in)
Tarsus		75–87 mm (3.0–3.4 in)
Weight		1,600–2,400 g (56–85 oz)

ginginianus
Wing	♂	393–490 mm (15–19 in)
	♀	455–505 mm (18–20 in)
Tail		228–251 mm (9.0–9.9 in)
Tarsus		72–85 mm (2.8–3.3 in)

majorensis
Wing		485–554 mm (19–22 in)
Tail		240–285 mm (9.4–11 in)
Tarsus		73.5–93 mm (2.9–3.7 in)
Weight		1,900–2,850 g (67–100 oz)

The adult Egyptian vulture measures 47–65 cm (19–26 in) from the point of the beak to the extremity of the tail feathers. Males of the smaller N. p. ginginianus are about 47–52 cm (19–20 in) long, while females are 52–55.5 cm (20.5–21.9 in) long. The wingspan is about 2.7 times the body length. Birds from Spain weigh about 1.9 kg (4.2 lb) while birds of the Canary Island subspecies N. p. majorensis, representing a case of island gigantism, have an average weight of 2.4 kg (5.3 lb).

The Egyptian vulture is among the smallest true Old World vultures, the only smaller species appears to be the marginally lighter palm-nut vulture, which may be an outlier from other vultures.

== Distribution and movements ==
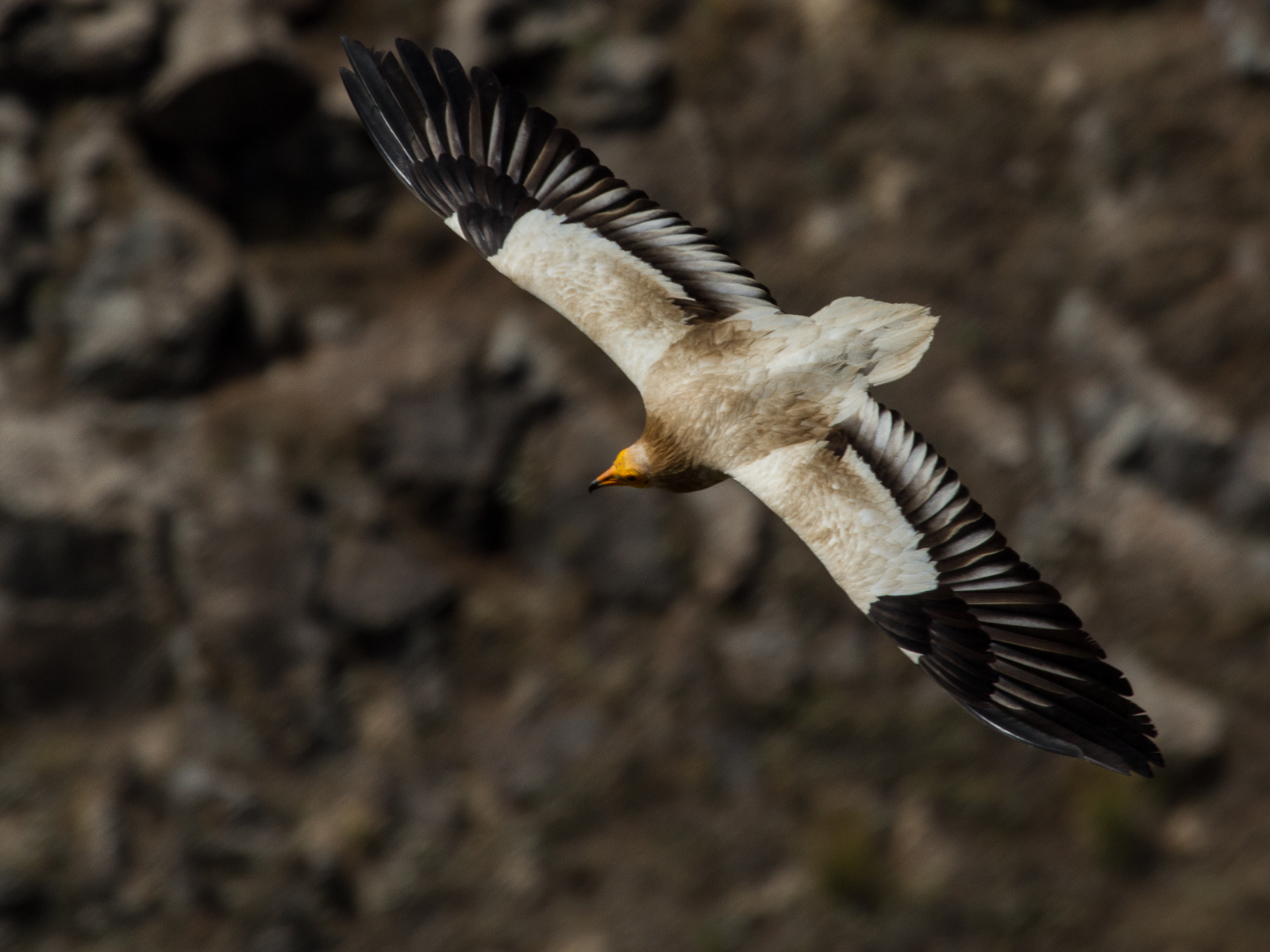
N. p. percnopterus in flight (Israel) showing the characteristic wing and tail shape.

Egyptian vultures are widely distributed across the Old World, with their breeding range from southern Europe to northern Africa east to western and southern Asia. They are rare vagrants in Sri Lanka. They occur mainly on the dry plains and lower hills. In the Himalayas, they go up to about 2,000 m (6,600 ft) in elevation in summer. In Armenia, breeding pairs have been found up to 2,300 m above mean sea level.

Most Egyptian vultures in the subtropical zone of Europe migrate south to Africa in winter. Vagrants may occur as far south as in South Africa, although they bred in the Transkei region prior to 1923. They nest mainly on rocky cliffs, sometimes adopting ledges on tall buildings in cities and on large trees. Like many other large, soaring migrants, they avoid making long crossings over water. Italian birds cross over through Sicily and into Tunisia, making short sea crossings by passing through the islands of Marettimo and Pantelleria, with rare stops on the island country of Malta. Those that migrate through the Iberian Peninsula cross into Africa over the Strait of Gibraltar while others cross further east through the Levant. In summer, some African birds fly farther north into Europe, and vagrants have been recorded in England, Ireland, and southern Sweden.

Migrating birds can sometimes cover 500 km (310 mi) in a single day until they reach the southern edge of the Sahara, 3,500 to 5,500 km (2,200 to 3,400 mi) from their summer home. Young birds that have not reached breeding age may overwinter in the grassland and semidesert regions of the Sahel.

== Fossil record ==
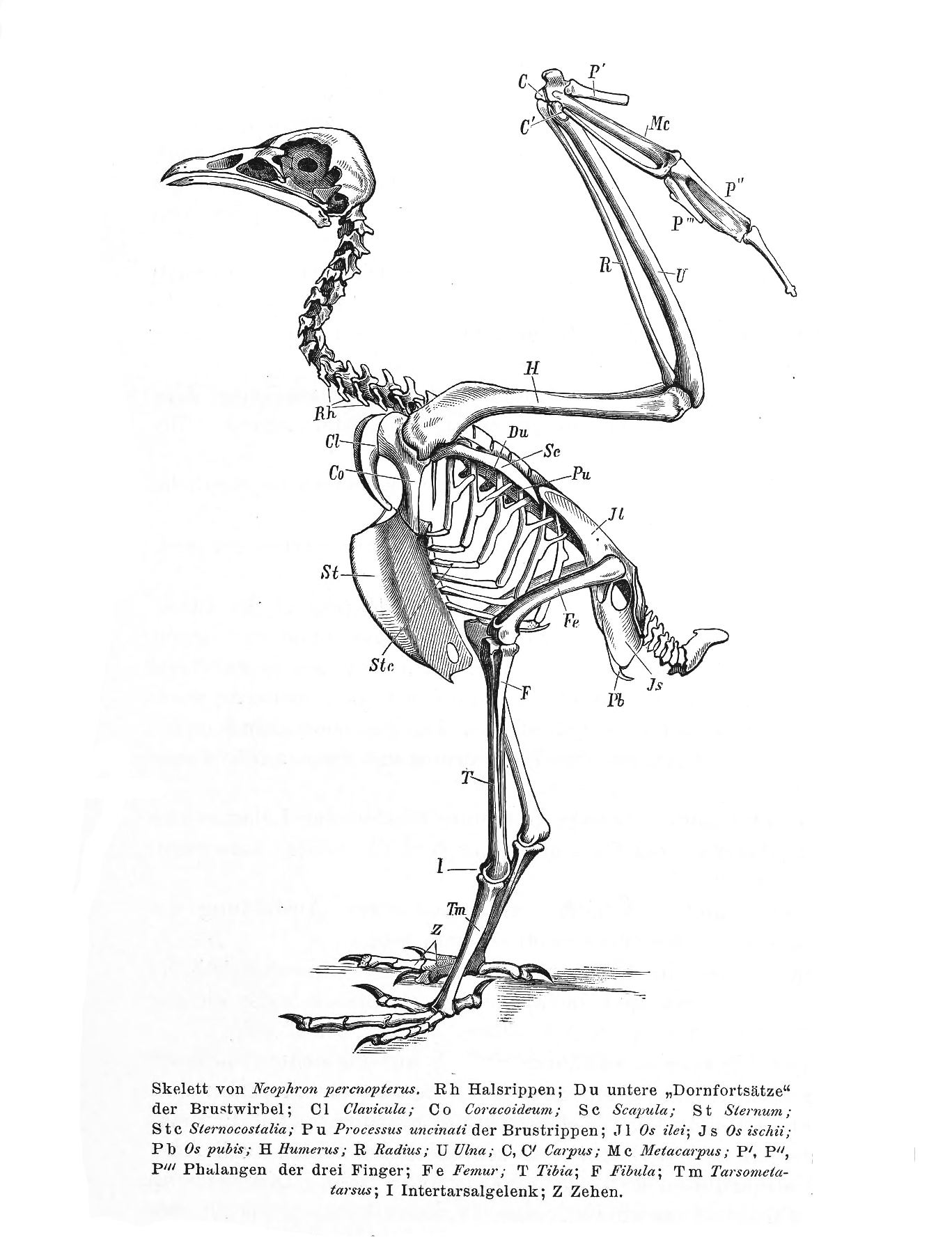
Skeleton of Egyptian vulture

Fossils of the Egyptian vulture found in the Nefud Desert of Saudi Arabia are estimated to date to the Middle Pleistocene about 500,000 years ago.

== Behaviour and ecology ==
The Egyptian vulture is usually seen singly or in pairs, soaring in thermals along with other scavengers and birds of prey, or perched on the ground or atop a building. On the ground, they walk with a waddling gait.

They feed on a range of food, including mammal faeces (including those of humans), insects in dung, carrion, vegetable matter, and sometimes small animals. It is the only Old World vulture species that regularly feeds on faeces. The carotenoids (primarily lutein) that the vultures absorb from the vegetal matter in the excrement that they ingest results in their bright yellow face colouration.

When it joins other vulture species at a dead animal, it tends to stay on the periphery and waits until the larger species leave. Pairs may also scrounge for food from other vultures, particularly griffons. Recently fledged young sometimes fly to other nests, competing with young vultures for food, stealing or even soliciting food from the (unrelated) adults bringing food. Wild rabbits (Oryctolagus cuniculus) form a significant part of the diet of Spanish vultures. In the Iberian Peninsula, landfills are an important food source, with the vultures more likely to occupy territories close to landfill sites. Studies suggest that they feed on ungulate faeces to obtain carotenoid pigments responsible for their bright yellow and orange facial skin. The ability to assimilate carotenoid pigments may serve as a reliable signal of fitness.

Egyptian vultures are mostly silent, but make high-pitched mewing or hissing notes at the nest and screeching noises when squabbling at a carcass. Young birds have been heard making a hissing croak in flight. They also hiss or growl when threatened or angry.

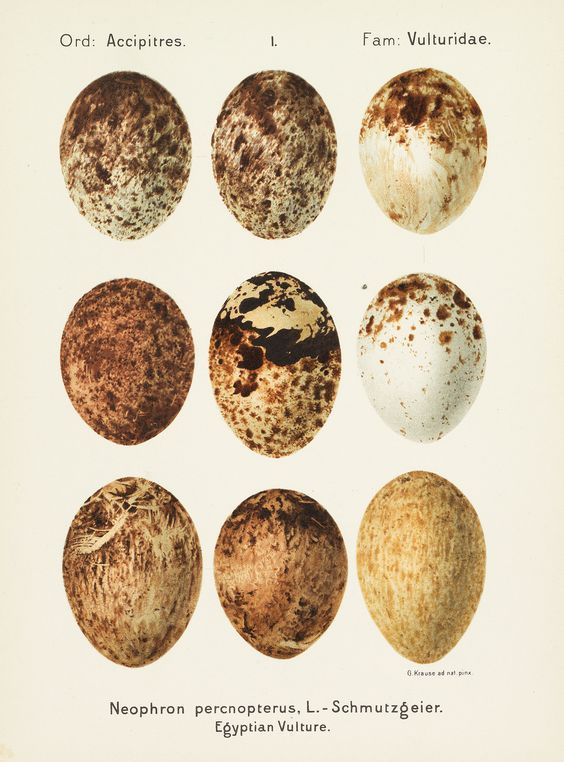
Eggs showing colour variation, chromolithograph by Georg Krause

Egyptian vultures roost communally on large trees, buildings, or cliffs. Roost sites are usually chosen close to a dump site or other suitable foraging area. In Spain and Morocco, summer roosts are formed mainly by immature birds. The favourite roost trees tended to be large, dead pines. The number of adults at the roost increases towards June. Breeding adults are thought to be able to forage more efficiently by joining the roost and following others to the best feeding areas. Breeding birds that failed to raise young may also join the nonbreeding birds at the roost during June. Allopreening has been observed in Canarian Egyptian vultures between mated pairs of individuals, as well as pairs of unrelated and same-sex individuals, particularly females.

=== Breeding ===
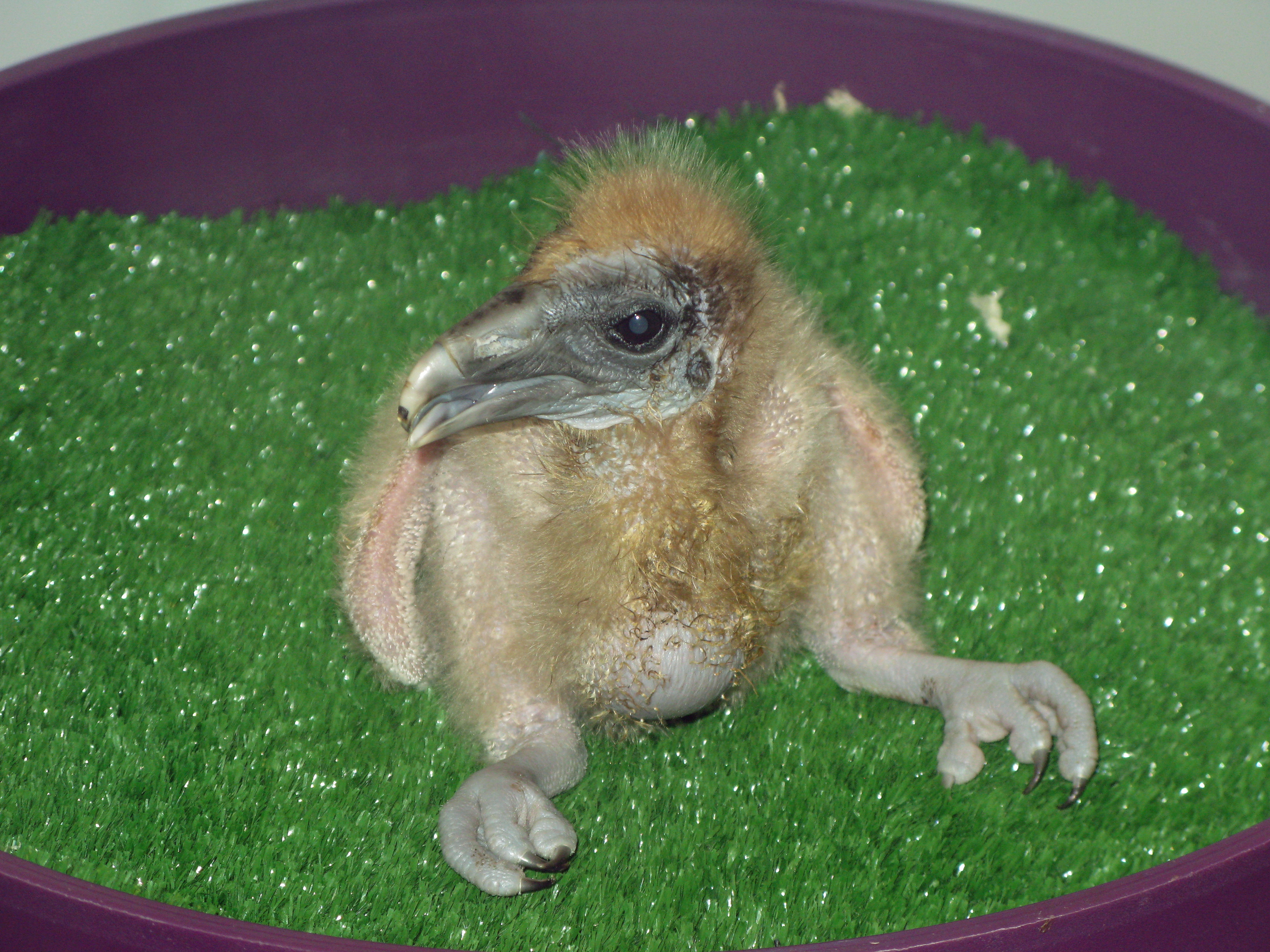
An 18-day-old chick

The breeding season is in spring. During the beginning of the breeding season, courting pairs soar high together and one or both may make steep, spiralling or swooping dives. The birds are monogamous and pair bonds may be maintained for more than one breeding season, and the same nest sites may be reused each year. The nest is an untidy platform of twigs lined with rags and placed on a cliff ledge, building, or fork of a large tree. Old nest platforms of eagles may also be taken over. Nests placed on the ground are rare, but have been recorded in subspecies N. p. ginginianus and N. p. majorensis. Extra-pair copulation with neighbouring birds has been recorded and may be a reason for adult males to stay close to the female before and during the egg-laying period. Females may sometimes associate with two males and all three help in raising the brood. The typical clutch consists of two eggs, which are incubated in turns by both parents. The eggs are brick red with the broad end covered more densely with blotches of red, brown, and black. The parents begin incubating soon after the first egg is laid, leading to asynchronous hatching. The first egg hatches after about 42 days. The second chick may hatch 3 to 5 days later, and a longer delay increases the likelihood that it will die of starvation. In cliffs where the nests are located close to each other, young birds have been known to clamber over to neighbouring nests to obtain food. In the Spanish population, young fledge and leave the nest after 90 to 110 days. Fledged birds continue to remain dependent on their parents for at least a month. Once the birds begin to forage on their own, they move away from their parents' territory; young birds have been found nearly 500 km away from their nest site. One-year-old European birds migrate to Africa and stay there for at least one year. A vulture that fledged in France stayed in Africa for three years before migrating north in spring. After migrating back to their breeding areas, young birds move widely in search of good feeding territories and mates. The full adult plumage is attained in the fourth or fifth year. Egyptian vultures have been known to live for up to 51 years in captivity and at least 21 years in the wild. The probability of survival in the wild varies with age, increasing till the age of two and then falling at the age of five. Older birds have an annual survival probability varying from 0.75 for nonbreeders to 0.83 for breeding birds.

=== Tool use ===
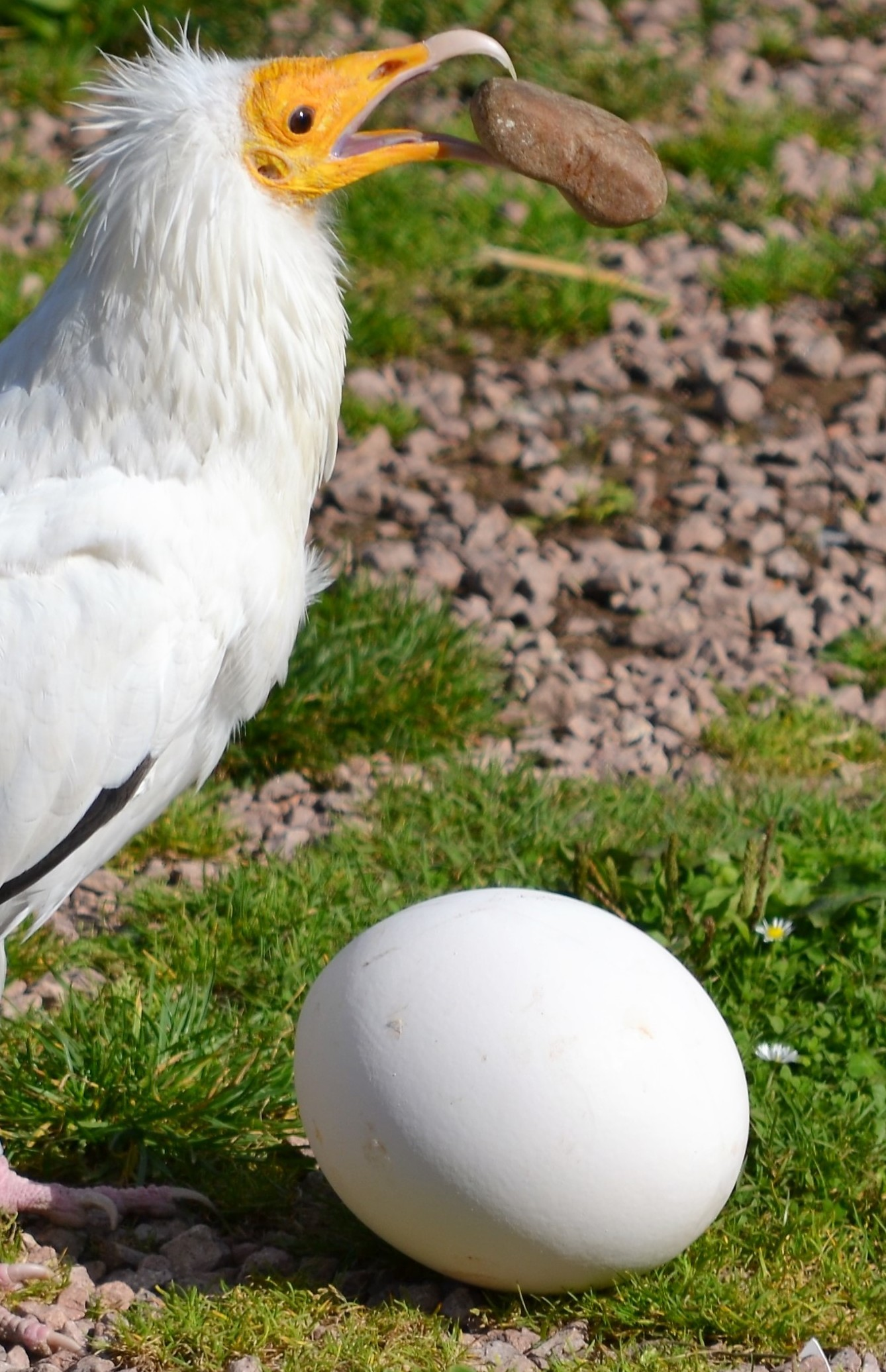
Egyptian vulture using a stone to crack a large egg

The nominate population, especially in Africa, is known for its use of stones as tools. When a large egg, such as that of an ostrich or bustard, is located, the bird walks up to it with a large pebble held in its bill and tosses the pebble by swinging the neck down over the egg. The operation is repeated until the egg cracks from the blows. They prefer using rounded pebbles to jagged rocks. This behaviour, although believed to have been first reported by Jane Goodall in 1966, was actually already known to Africans and was first reported by J. G. Wood in 1877. This has only been reported in Africa, though, and has not been recorded in N. p. ginginianus. Tests with both hand-reared and wild birds suggest that the behaviour is innate, not learnt by observing other birds, and elicited once they associate eggs with food and have access to pebbles. Their ability to deal with ostrich eggs is used by brown-necked ravens, which form groups that wait for the eggs to be broken before collectively mobbing the vultures and engaging in kleptoparasitism. Another case of tool use described from Bulgaria involves the use of a twig as a tool to roll up and gather strands of wool to use for lining the nest.

== Threats and conservation ==
Healthy adults do not have many predators, but human activities pose many threats. Collisions with power lines, hunting, intentional poisoning, lead accumulation from ingesting gunshot in carcasses, and pesticide accumulation take a toll on populations. Young birds at the nest are sometimes taken by golden eagles, eagle-owls, and red foxes. Only rarely do adult birds attempt to drive away predators. Young birds that fall off of cliff ledges may be preyed on by mammalian predators such as jackals, foxes, and wolves. Like all birds, they serve as hosts for ectoparasitic bird lice, including Aegypoecus perspicuus, as well as organisms that live within them such as mycoplasmas.

Egyptian vulture populations have declined in most parts of their ranges. In Europe and most of the Middle East, populations in 2001 were half of those from 1980. In India, the decline has been rapid, with a 35% decrease for each year from 1999 to 2003, causing their status to change to critically endangered. In 1967–70, the area around Delhi was estimated to have 12,000–15,000 of these vultures, with an average density of about five pairs per 10 km^{2}. The exact cause of the decline is not known, but has been linked with the use of the NSAID diclofenac, which has been known to cause death in Gyps vultures.

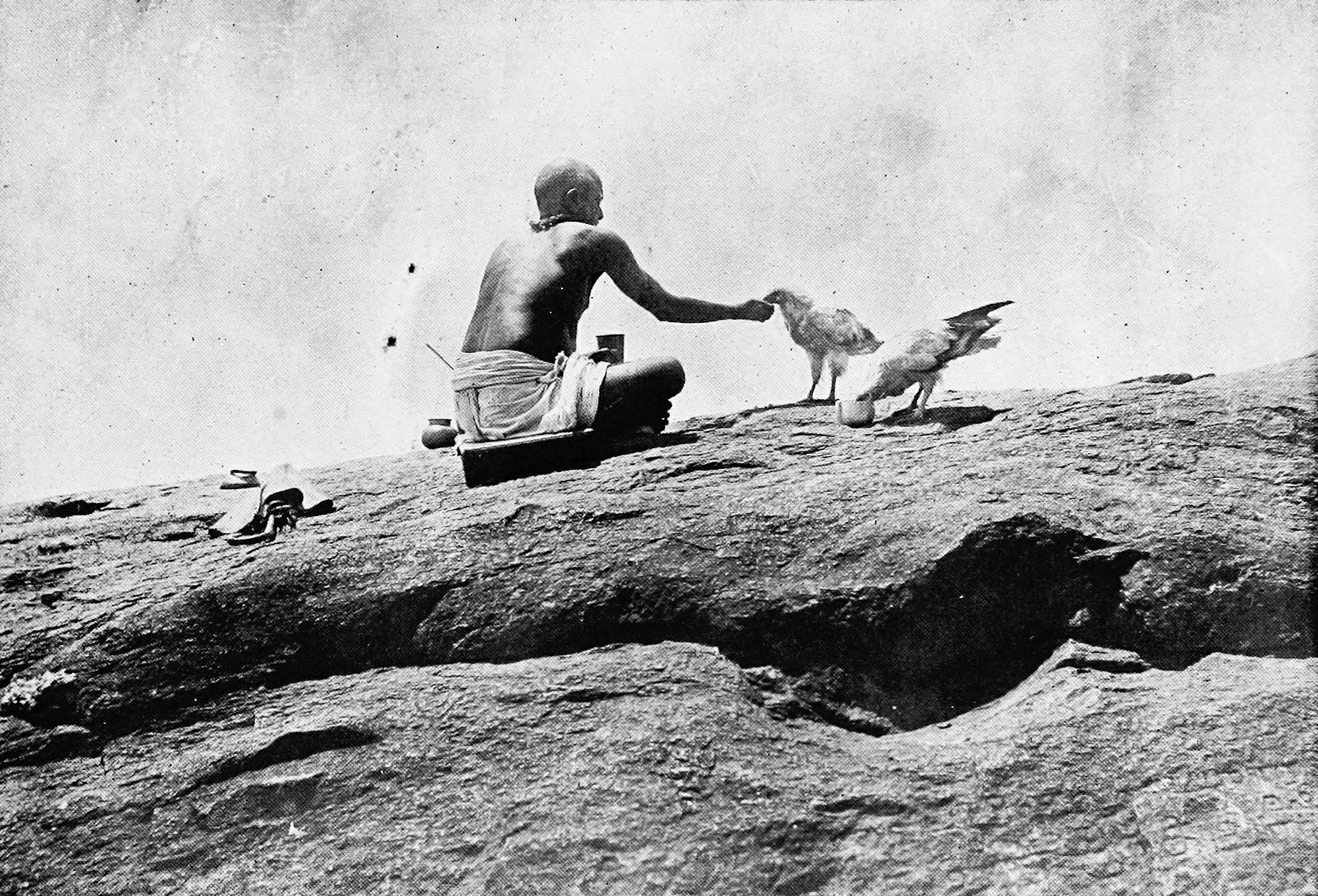
The "sacred pair" at Thirukalukundram in 1906

In Italy, the number of breeding pairs declined from 30 in 1970 to 9 in the 1990s. Nearly all breeding failures were due to human activities. In Spain, which holds about 50% of the European population, suggested causes of decline include poisoning by accumulation of lead, pesticides (especially due to large-scale use in the control of Schistocerca gregaria locust swarms), and electrocution. Windfarms may also pose a threat. Poorly designed power transmission lines in east Africa electrocute many wintering vultures. A shortage of carrion resulting from new rules for disposal of dead animals following the outbreak of bovine spongiform encephalitis in parts of Europe during 2000 may have also had an effect on some populations. In Armenia, direct persecution for trophies and for local illegal trade of animals as pets has been recorded.

The population of Egyptian vultures in the Canary Islands has been isolated from those in Europe and Africa for a significant period of time, leading to genetic differentiation. The vulture population there declined by 30% in the years between 1987 and 1998. The Canarian Egyptian vulture was common historically, occurring on the islands of La Gomera, Tenerife, Gran Canaria, Fuerteventura, and Lanzarote. It is now restricted to Fuerteventura and Lanzarote, the two easternmost islands. The total population in 2000 was estimated at 130 individuals, including 25–30 breeding pairs. Island birds also appear to accumulate significantlevels of lead from scavenging on hunted animal carcasses. The long-term effect of this poison at a sublethal level is not known, though it is known to alter the mineralization of their bones.

To provide safe and uncontaminated food for nesting birds, attempts have been made to create "vulture restaurants", where carcasses are made available. However, these interventions may also encourage other opportunist predators and scavengers to concentrate at the site and pose a threat to vultures nesting in the vicinity.

Since 2012, conservation efforts have been implemented to protect Egyptian vultures along breeding grounds, migration routes, and wintering areas of the eastern European population; these measures include monitoring, nest guarding, supplementary feeding, insulating hazardous electric power lines, and removing poison baits and carcasses with trained dogs. Adult annual survival and juvenile monthly survival appear to have increased, leading to a notable rise in population.

In Iran, a community-based project was launched in 2023 on Qeshm Island, with the aim to reduce threats to the small breeding population of Egyptian vultures through awareness campaigns, installation of bird-friendly electric poles, and engaging fishers and local stakeholders in conservation efforts.

== In culture ==
G1
Egyptian Vulture
in hieroglyphs

The Hebrew Bible makes a reference to the Egyptian vulture under the Hebrew name of rachamah/racham, which has been translated into English as "gier-eagle".

In Ancient Egypt, several hieroglyphs include the Egyptian vulture, such as what is listed as G1 in Gardiner's sign list - U+1313F 𓄿 EGYPTIAN HIEROGLYPH G001. The bird was held sacred to Isis and Mut in ancient Egyptian religion. The use of the vulture as a symbol of royalty in Egyptian culture and its protection by Pharaonic law made the species common on the streets of Egypt and gave rise to the name "pharaoh's chicken".

Coprophagy in Egyptian vultures gives them the Spanish names of "churretero" and "moñiguero", which mean "dung-eater". In the Balkans, it is considered as a herald of spring and as a bird of good omen.

British sportsmen in colonial India considered them to be among the ugliest birds, and their habit of feeding on feces was particularly despised. In British India, they were known as "shawks" a contraction of shite-hawk or shit-hawk. In Sindh, the yolk of the egg of the vulture is believed to remove venom and cure snake bite and scorpion stings.

A southern Indian temple at Thirukalukundram near Chengalpattu was famed for a pair of birds that reputedly visited the temple for "centuries". These birds were ceremonially fed by the temple priests and arrived before noon to feed on offerings made from rice, wheat, ghee, and sugar. Normally punctual, any failure of the birds to turn up was attributed to the presence of "sinners" among the onlookers. Legend has it the vultures (or "eagles") represented eight sages who were punished by Shiva, with two of them leaving in each of a series of epochs.

== Footnotes ==
Cited works

- Agarwal, G.P.; Ahmad, Aftab; Arya, Gaurav; Saxena, Renu; Nisar, Arjumand; Saxena, A.K. (2012). "Chaetotaxy of three nymphal instars of an ischnoceran louse, Aegypoecus perspicuus (Phthiraptera: Insecta)". Journal of Applied and Natural Science. 4 (1): 92–95. doi:10.31018/jans.v4i1.230.
- Agostini, Nicolantonio; Premuda, Guido; Mellone, Ugo; Panuccio, Michele; Logozzo, Daniela; Bassi, Enrico; Cocchi, Leonardo (2004). "Crossing the sea en route to Africa: Autumn migration of some Accipitriformes over two Central Mediterranean islands" (PDF). The Ring. 26 (2): 71–78. doi:10.2478/v10050-008-0062-6. S2CID 42858694. Archived from the original (PDF) on 26 March 2012.
- Agudo, Rosa; Rico, Ciro; Vilà, Carles; Hiraldo, Fernando; Donázar, José (2010). "The role of humans in the diversification of a threatened island raptor". BMC Evolutionary Biology. 10 (1): 384. Bibcode:2010BMCEE..10..384A. doi:10.1186/1471-2148-10-384. PMC 3009672. PMID 21144015.
- Ali, Sálim; Ripley, Sidney Dillon (1978). Handbook of the birds of India and Pakistan. Vol. 1 (2nd ed.). Oxford University Press. pp. 310–314. ISBN 978-0-19-562063-4.
- Anonymous (1854). Scripture natural history. Philadelphia: Presbyterian Board of Publication. p. 80.
- Angelov, Ivaylo; Hashim, Ibrahim; Oppel, Steffen (2012). "Persistent electrocution mortality of Egyptian Vultures Neophron percnopterus over 28 years in East Africa". Bird Conservation International. 23: 1–6. doi:10.1017/S0959270912000123.
- Baker, E.C. Stuart (1928). The Fauna of British India. Birds. Vol. 5 (2nd ed.). London: Taylor and Francis. pp. 22–24.
- Baxter, R. M.; Urban, E. K.; Brown, L. H (1969). "A Nineteenth-century reference to the use of tools by the Egyptian vulture". Journal of the East Africa Natural History Society and National Museum. 27 (3): 231–232. doi:10.5962/p.201642.
- Biddulph, C.H. (1937). "Unusual site for the nest of the White Scavenger Vulture Neophron percnopterus ginginianus (Lath.)". The Journal of the Bombay Natural History Society. 39 (3): 635–636.
- Carrete, Martina; Sánchez-Zapata, José A.; Benítez, José R.; Lobón, Manuel; Donázar, José A. (2009). "Large scale risk-assessment of wind-farms on population viability of a globally endangered long-lived raptor" (PDF). Biological Conservation. 142 (12): 2954–2961. Bibcode:2009BCons.142.2954C. doi:10.1016/j.biocon.2009.07.027. hdl:10261/64944. S2CID 54974.
- Ceballos, Olga; Donázar, José Antonio (1990). "Roost-tree characteristics, food habits and seasonal abundance of roosting Egyptian Vultures in northern Spain". Journal of Raptor Research. 24 (1–2): 19–25. ISSN 0892-1016.
- Ceballos, Olga; Donázar, José Antonio (1989). "Factors influencing the breeding density and nest-site selection of Egyptian vulture (Neophron percnopterus)". Journal of Ornithology. 130 (3): 353–359. Bibcode:1989JOrn..130..353C. doi:10.1007/BF01644748. S2CID 36709514.
- Clark, William S.; Schmitt, N.J. (1998). "Ageing Egyptian Vultures" (PDF). Alula. 4: 122–127. Archived from the original (PDF) on 20 April 2022.
- Cortés-Avizanda, A.; Carrete, M.; Serrano, D.; Donázar, J.A. (2009). "Carcasses increase the probability of predation of ground-nesting birds: a caveat regarding the conservation value of vulture restaurants" (PDF). Animal Conservation. 12 (1): 85–88. Bibcode:2009AnCon..12...85C. doi:10.1111/j.1469-1795.2008.00231.x. hdl:10261/35439. S2CID 83667940. Archived from the original (PDF) on 24 September 2011.
- Cortés-Avizanda, Ainara; Ceballos, Olga; Donázar, José A. (2009). "Long-Term Trends in Population Size and Breeding Success in the Egyptian Vulture (Neophron percnopterus) in Northern Spain" (PDF). Journal of Raptor Research. 43 (1): 43–49. doi:10.3356/JRR-08-24.1. hdl:10261/35441. S2CID 85787233.
- Coultas, Harland (1876). Zoology of the Bible. London: Wesleyan Conference Office.
- Cuthbert, R.; Green, R.E.; Ranade, S.; Saravanan, S.; Pain, D.J.; Prakash, V.; Cunningham, A.A. (2006). "Rapid population declines of Egyptian vulture (Neophron percnopterus) and red-headed vulture (Sarcogyps calvus) in India". Animal Conservation. 9 (3): 349–354. Bibcode:2006AnCon...9..349C. doi:10.1111/j.1469-1795.2006.00041.x. S2CID 52065487.
- Dewar, Douglas (1906). Bombay Ducks. John Lane, London. p. 277.
- Donázar, José Antonio; Ceballos, Olga (1989). "Growth rates of nestling Egyptian Vultures Neophron percnopterus in relation to brood size, hatching order and environmental factors" (PDF). Ardea. 77 (2): 217–226. ISSN 0373-2266.
- Donázar, Jose A.; Ceballos, Olga (1988). "Red fox predation on fledgling Egyptian vultures". Journal of Raptor Research. 22 (3): 88.
- Donázar, José Antonio; Ceballos, Olga (1989). "Post-fledging dependence period and development of flight and foraging behaviour in the Egyptian Vulture Neophron percnopterus" (PDF). Ardea. 78 (3): 387–394. ISSN 0373-2266.
- Donázar, José A.; Ceballos, Olga (1990). "Acquisition of food by fledgling Egyptian Vultures Neophron percnopterus by nest-switching and acceptance by foster adults". Ibis. 132 (4): 603–607. doi:10.1111/j.1474-919X.1990.tb00284.x.
- Donázar, José A.; Ceballos, Olga; Tella, José L. (1994). "Copulation behaviour in the Egyptian Vulture Neophron percnopterus". Bird Study. 41 (1): 37–41. Bibcode:1994BirdS..41...37D. doi:10.1080/00063659409477195.
- Donázar, José A.; Ceballos, Olga; Tella, José L. (1996). "Communal roosts of Egyptian vultures (Neophron percnopterus): dynamics and implications for the species conservation" ( (PDF)). In Muntaner, J. (ed.). Biology and Conservation of Mediterranean Raptors. Monografía SEO-BirdLife, Madrid. pp. 189–201. Archived from the original on 16 July 2015.
- Donázar, José A.; Palacios, César J.; Gangoso, Laura; Ceballos, Olga; González, Maria J.; Hiraldo, Fernando (2002). "Conservation status and limiting factors in the endangered population of Egyptian vulture (Neophron percnopterus) in the Canary Islands" (PDF). Biological Conservation. 107 (1): 89–97. Bibcode:2002BCons.107...89D. doi:10.1016/S0006-3207(02)00049-6. hdl:10261/62576.
- Donázar, José Antonio; Negro, Juan José; Palacios, César Javier; Gangoso, Laura; Godoy, José Antonio; Ceballos, Olga; Hiraldo, Fernando; Capote, Nieves (2002). "Description of a new subspecies of the Egyptian Vulture (Accipitridae: Neophron percnopterus) from the Canary Islands". Journal of Raptor Research. 36 (1): 17–23. ISSN 0892-1016.
- Elorriaga, Javier; Zuberogoitia, Iñigo; Castillo, Iñaki; Azkona, Ainara; Hidalgo, Sonia; Astorkia, Lander; Ruiz-Moneo, Fernando; Iraeta, Agurtzane (2009). "First Documented Case of Long-Distance Dispersal in the Egyptian Vulture (Neophron percnopterus)". Journal of Raptor Research. 43 (2): 142–145. doi:10.3356/JRR-08-53.1. S2CID 86245227.
- Feduccia, Alan (1974). "Another Old World Vulture from the New World". The Wilson Bulletin. 86 (3): 251–255.
- Ferguson-Lees, James; Christie, David A. (2001). Raptors of the World. Christopher Helm. pp. 417–420. ISBN 978-0-691-12684-5.
- Galushin, V.M. (1975). "A comparative analysis of the density of predatory birds in two selected areas within the Palaearctic and Oriental regions, near Moscow and Delhi (IOC Abstracts)" (PDF). Emu. 74 (5): 331. doi:10.1071/MU974330.
- Galushin, V. M. (2001). "Populations of vultures and other raptors in Delhi and neighboring areas from 1970's to 1990's". In Parry-Jones, J.; Katzner, T. (eds.). Report from the Workshop on Indian Gyps vultures: 4th Eurasian congress on raptors. Sevilla, Spain: aviary.org. pp. 13–15.
- Gangoso, Laura (2005). "Ground nesting by Egyptian Vultures (Neophron percnopterus) in the Canary Islands" (PDF). Journal of Raptor Research. 39 (2): 186–187. ISSN 0892-1016. Archived from the original (PDF) on 24 September 2020.
- Gangoso, Laura; Álvarez-Lloret, Pedro; Rodríguez-Navarro, Alejandro A. B.; Mateo, Rafael; Hiraldo, Fernando; Donázar, José Antonio (2009). "Long-term effects of lead poisoning on bone mineralization in vultures exposed to ammunition sources" (PDF). Environmental Pollution. 157 (2): 569–574. Bibcode:2009EPoll.157..569G. doi:10.1016/j.envpol.2008.09.015. PMID 18995938.
- García-Ripollés, Clara; López-López, Pascual (2006). Penteriani, Vincenzo (ed.). "Population size and breeding performance of Egyptian vultures (Neophron percnopterus) in eastern Iberian Peninsula" (PDF). Journal of Raptor Research. 40 (3): 217–221. doi:10.3356/0892-1016(2006)40[217:PSABPO]2.0.CO;2. ISSN 0892-1016. S2CID 86281298.
- García-Ripollés, Clara; López-López, Pascual; Urios, Vicente (2010). "First description of migration and wintering of adult Egyptian Vultures Neophron percnopterus tracked by GPS satellite telemetry". Bird Study. 57 (2): 261–265. Bibcode:2010BirdS..57..261G. doi:10.1080/00063650903505762. S2CID 55279417.
- Grande, Juan M.; Serrano, David; Tavecchia, Giacomo; Carrete, Martina; Ceballos, Olga; Díaz-Delgado, Ricardo; Tella, José L.; Donázar, José A. (2009). "Survival in a long-lived territorial migrant: effects of life-history traits and ecological conditions in wintering and breeding areas" (PDF). Oikos. 118 (4): 580–590. Bibcode:2009Oikos.118..580G. CiteSeerX 10.1.1.501.401. doi:10.1111/j.1600-0706.2009.17218.x. hdl:10261/58166.
- Grimal, Pierre (1996). The dictionary of classical mythology. Wiley-Blackwell. p. 18. ISBN 978-0-631-20102-1.
- Hartert, Ernst (1920). Die Vögel der paläarktischen Fauna. Volume 2. Berlin: Friendlander & Sohn. pp. 1200–1202.
- Hernández, Mauro; Margalida, Antoni (2009). "Poison-related mortality effects in the endangered Egyptian vulture (Neophron percnopterus) population in Spain" (PDF). European Journal of Wildlife Research. 55 (4): 415–423. Bibcode:2009EJWR...55..415H. doi:10.1007/s10344-009-0255-6. S2CID 27680785. Archived from the original (PDF) on 20 March 2014.
- Hertel, Fritz (1995). "Ecomorphological indicators of feeding behavior in recent and fossil raptors". The Auk. 112 (4): 890–903. doi:10.2307/4089021. hdl:10211.3/138737. JSTOR 4089021.
- Hidalgo, S.; Zabala, J.; Zubergoitia, I.; Azkona, A.; Castillo, I. (2005). "Food of the Egyptian vulture (Neophron percnopterus) in Biscay" (PDF). Buteo. 14: 23–29.
- Ingerson, Ernest (1923). Birds in legend, fable and folklore. New York: Longmans, Green and Co.
- Jardine, William; Selby, Prideaux John (1826). Illustrations of ornithology. Vol. 1. Edinburgh: W.H. Lizars.
- Koenig, Alexander (1907). "Die Geier Aegyptens" [The Egyptian vulture]. Journal für Ornithologie (in German). 55 (1): 59–134. Bibcode:1907JOrn...55...59K. doi:10.1007/BF02098853. S2CID 26329371.
- Kretzmann, Maria B.; Capote, N.; Gautschi, B.; Godoy, J.A.; Donázar, J.A.; Negro, J.J. (2003). "Genetically distinct island populations of the Egyptian vulture (Neophron percnopterus)". Conservation Genetics. 4 (6): 697–706. Bibcode:2003ConG....4..697K. doi:10.1023/B:COGE.0000006123.67128.86. hdl:10261/39409. S2CID 21862567.
- Latham, John (1787). Supplement to the General Synopsis of birds. London: Leigh & Sotheby. p. 7.
- Liberatori, Fabio; Penteriani, Vincenzo (2001). "A long-term analysis of the declining population of the Egyptian vulture in the Italian peninsula: distribution, habitat preference, productivity and conservation implications" (PDF). Biological Conservation. 101 (3): 381–389. Bibcode:2001BCons.101..381L. doi:10.1016/S0006-3207(01)00086-6. hdl:10261/62278.
- Linnaeus, C. (1758). Systema Naturæ per regna tria naturae, secundum classes, ordines, genera, species, cum characteribus, differentiis, synonymis, locis, Volume 1 (in Latin). Vol. v.1 (10th ed.). Holmiae:Laurentii Salvii.
- Margalida, A.; Benítez, J.R.; Sánchez-Zapata, J.A.; Ávila, E.; Arenas, R.; Donázar, J.A. (2012). "Long-term relationship between diet breadth and breeding success in a declining population of Egyptian Vultures Neophron percnopterus" (PDF). Ibis. 154: 184–188. doi:10.1111/j.1474-919X.2011.01189.x. hdl:10261/59019. Archived from the original (PDF) on 20 March 2014.
- Margalida, Antoni; Boudet, Jennifer (2003). "Dynamics and temporal variation in age structure at a communal roost of egyptian vultures (Neophron percnopterus) in northeastern Spain". Journal of Raptor Research. 37 (3): 252–256.
- Peters, James L. (1979). Mayr, Ernst; Cottrell, G.W. (eds.). Check-list of birds of the world. Vol. 1 (2nd ed.). Cambridge, Massachusetts: Museum of Comparative Zoology. p. 304.
- Mateo, Patricia; Olea, Pedro P. (2007). "Egyptian Vultures (Neophron percnopterus) Attack Golden Eagles (Aquila chrysaetos) to Defend their Fledgling". Journal of Raptor Research. 41 (4): 339–340. doi:10.3356/0892-1016(2007)41[339:EVNPAG]2.0.CO;2. ISSN 0892-1016. S2CID 85728751.
- Meyburg, Bernd-U.; Gallardo, Max; Meyburg, Christiane; Dimitrova, Elena (2004). "Migrations and sojourn in Africa of Egyptian vultures (Neophron percnopterus) tracked by satellite" (PDF). Journal of Ornithology. 145 (4): 273–280. Bibcode:2004JOrni.145..273M. doi:10.1007/s10336-004-0037-6. S2CID 33920088.
- Mundy, P.J. (1978). "The Egyptian vulture (Neophron Percnopterus) in Southern Africa". Biological Conservation. 14 (4): 307–315. Bibcode:1978BCons..14..307M. doi:10.1016/0006-3207(78)90047-2.
- Neelakantan, K.K. (1977). "The sacred birds of Thirukkalukundram". Newsletter for Birdwatchers. 17 (4): 6.
- Negro, J.J.; Grande, J.M.; Tella, J.L.; Garrido, J.; Hornero, D.; Donázar, J.A.; Sanchez-Zapata, J.A.; Benítez, J.R.; Barcell, M. (2002). "Coprophagy: An unusual source of essential carotenoids" (PDF). Nature. 416 (6883): 807–808. Bibcode:2002Natur.416..807N. doi:10.1038/416807a. hdl:10261/34871. PMID 11976670. S2CID 4394760. Archived from the original (PDF) on 20 March 2014.
- Palacios, César-Javier (2004). "Current status and distribution of birds of prey in the Canary Islands". Bird Conservation International. 14 (3): 203–213. doi:10.1017/S0959270904000255.
- Palacios, César-Javier (2000). "Decline of the Egyptian vulture (Neophron percnopterus) in the Canary Islands". Journal of Raptor Research. 34 (1): 61.
- Paynter, W.P. (1924). "Lesser White Scavenger Vulture N. ginginianus nesting on the ground". The Journal of the Bombay Natural History Society. 30 (1): 224–225.
- Pope, G.U. (1900). The Tiruvacagam or Sacred utterances of the Tamil poet, saint, and sage Manikka-vacagar. Oxford: Clarendon Press.
- Prakash, Vibhu; Nanjappa, C. (1988). "An instance of active predation by Scavenger Vulture (Neophron p. ginginianus) on Checkered Keelback watersnake (Xenochrophis piscator) in Keoladeo National Park, Bharatpur, Rajasthan". The Journal of the Bombay Natural History Society. 85 (2): 419.
- Rasmussen, P.C.; Anderton, J.C. (2005). Birds of South Asia: The Ripley Guide. Vol. 2. Smithsonian Institution and Lynx Edicions. p. 89.
- Seibold, I.; Helbig, A.J. (1995). "Evolutionary History of New and Old World Vultures Inferred from Nucleotide Sequences of the Mitochondrial Cytochrome b Gene". Philosophical Transactions of the Royal Society B: Biological Sciences. 350 (1332): 163–178. Bibcode:1995RSPTB.350..163S. doi:10.1098/rstb.1995.0150. PMID 8577858.
- Siromoney, Gift (1977). "The Neophron Vultures of Thirukkalukundram". Newsletter for Birdwatchers. 17 (6): 1–4.
- Spaar, Reto (1997). "Flight strategies of migrating raptors; a comparative study of interspecific variation in flight characteristics". Ibis. 139 (3): 523–535. doi:10.1111/j.1474-919X.1997.tb04669.x.
- Stoyanova, Yva; Stefanov, Nikolai (1993). "Predation upon nestling Egyptian Vultures (Neophron percnopterus) in the Vratsa Mountains of Bulgaria". Journal of Raptor Research. 27 (2): 123. ISSN 0892-1016.
- Stoyanova, Yva; Stefanov, Nikolai; Schmutz, Josef K. (2010). "Twig Used as a Tool by the Egyptian Vulture (Neophron percnopterus)". Journal of Raptor Research. 44 (2): 154–156. doi:10.3356/JRR-09-20.1. hdl:10261/65850. S2CID 85076656.
- Suárez-Pérez, A.; Ramírez, A.S.; Rosales, R.S.; Calabuig, P.; Poveda, C.; Rosselló-Móra, R.; Nicholas, R.A.J.; Poveda, J.B. (2012). "Mycoplasma neophronis sp. nov., isolated from the upper respiratory tract of Canarian Egyptian vultures (Neophron percnopterus majorensis)". International Journal of Systematic and Evolutionary Microbiology. 62 (Pt 6): 1321–1325. doi:10.1099/ijs.0.033803-0. ISSN 1466-5026. PMID 21828019.
- Stratton-Porter, Gene (1909). Birds of the Bible. Cincinnati: Jennings and Graham. p. 182.
- Tella, José Luis (1993). "Polyandrous trios in a population of Egyptian vultures (Neophron percnopterus)". Journal of Raptor Research. 27 (2): 119–120.
- Tella, José L.; Mañosa, Santi (1993). "Eagle owl predation on Egyptian vulture and northern goshawk: possible effect of a decrease in European rabbit availability". Journal of Raptor Research. 27 (2): 111–112.
- Thompson, D'Arcy Wentworth (1895). A glossary of Greek birds. Oxford: Clarendon Press.
- Thouless, C.R.; Fanshawe, J.H.; Bertram, B.C.R. (1989). "Egyptian Vultures Neophron percnopterus and Ostrich Struthio camelus eggs: The origins of stone-throwing behaviour". Ibis. 131: 9–15. doi:10.1111/j.1474-919X.1989.tb02737.x.
- Thurston, E.W. (1906). Ethnographic notes in southern India. Madras: Government Press.
- van Lawick-Goodall, Jane; van Lawick, Hugo (1966). "Use of Tools by the Egyptian Vulture, Neophron percnopterus". Nature. 212 (5069): 1468–1469. Bibcode:1966Natur.212.1468V. doi:10.1038/2121468a0. S2CID 4204223.
- van Overveld, T.; de la Riva, M.; Donázar, J. A. (2017). "Cosmetic coloration in Egyptian vultures: Mud bathing as a tool for social communication?". Ecology. 98 (8): 2216–2218. Bibcode:2017Ecol...98.2216V. doi:10.1002/ecy.1840. hdl:11000/6006. PMID 28481410.
- van Overveld, Thijs; Sol, Daniel; Blanco, Guillermo; Margalida, Antoni; de la Riva, Manuel; Donázar, José Antonio (2021). "Vultures as an overlooked model in cognitive ecology". Animal Cognition. 25 (3): 495–507. doi:10.1007/s10071-021-01585-2. ISSN 1435-9448. PMID 34817739. S2CID 244528546.
- Whistler, Hugh (1949). Popular Handbook of Indian Birds (4th ed.). London: Gurney & Jackson. pp. 356–357. ISBN 978-1-4067-4576-4.
- Whistler, Hugh (1922). "The birds of Jhang district, S.W.Punjab. Part II. Non-Passerine birds". Ibis. 64 (3): 401–437. doi:10.1111/j.1474-919X.1922.tb01326.x.
- Wink, Michael (1995). "Phylogeny of Old and New World Vultures (Aves: Accipitridae and Cathartidae) Inferred from Nucleotide Sequences of the Mitochondrial Cytochrome b Gene" (PDF). Zeitschrift für Naturforschung C. 50 (11/12): 868–882. doi:10.1515/znc-1995-11-1220. PMID 8561830. S2CID 1388021. Archived from the original (PDF) on 16 March 2012.
- Wink, Michael; Heidrich, Petra; Fentzloff, Claus (1996). "A mtDNA phylogeny of sea eagles (genus Haliaeetus) based on nucleotide sequences of the cytochrome b-gene" (PDF). Biochemical Systematics and Ecology. 24 (7–8): 783–791. Bibcode:1996BioSE..24..783W. doi:10.1016/S0305-1978(96)00049-X.
- Yosef, Reuven; Alon, Dan (1997). "Do immature Palearctic Egyptian Vultures Neophron percnopterus remain in Africa during the northern summer?". Vogelwelt. 118: 285–289.
- Yosef, Reuven; Kabesa, Shai; Yosef, Nufar (2011). "Set a thief to catch a thief: brown-necked raven (Corvus ruficollis) cooperatively kleptoparasitize Egyptian vulture (Neophron percnopterus)". Naturwissenschaften. 98 (5): 443–446. Bibcode:2011NW.....98..443Y. doi:10.1007/s00114-011-0777-0. ISSN 0028-1042. PMID 21409436. S2CID 6532659.
- Zarudny, V.; Härms, M. (1902). "Neue Vogelarten". Ornithologische Monatsberichte (in German) (4): 49–55.
