= Georg Krause (oologist) =

German oologist and egg illustrator (1858–1915)

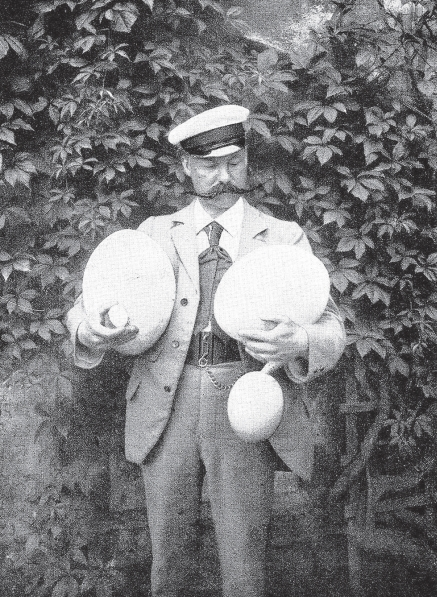
Krause with two Aepyornis eggs, an ostrich egg and a hen's egg, c. 1900

Georg (Albert Julius) Krause (1858 – 7 February 1915) was a Silesian-German oologist and bookseller from Hirschberg. He illustrated and published a book on the eggs of palearctic birds. Among his significant collections were eggs of the now-extinct Aepyornis.

== Biography ==
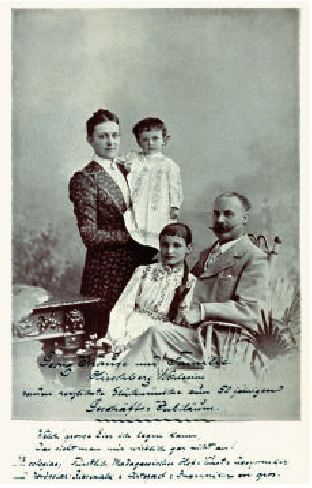
Krause with wife Hedwig and children

Krause was born in Glogau, Kingdom of Prussia, and started collecting eggs during his childhood. He later lived in Hirschberg, Silesia. In 1900 he was in charge of the natural and geological collections at the Karkonosze Museum in Jelenia Góra. In 1901 he published a pamphlet on the anatomical structure of the ears of birds. In 1905 he became a curator at the Zoological Museum in Berlin and published the Oologia universalis palaearctica from 1906 to 1913 in 78 fascicles out of a projected 150 with quarto plates made from his own illustrations of eggs.

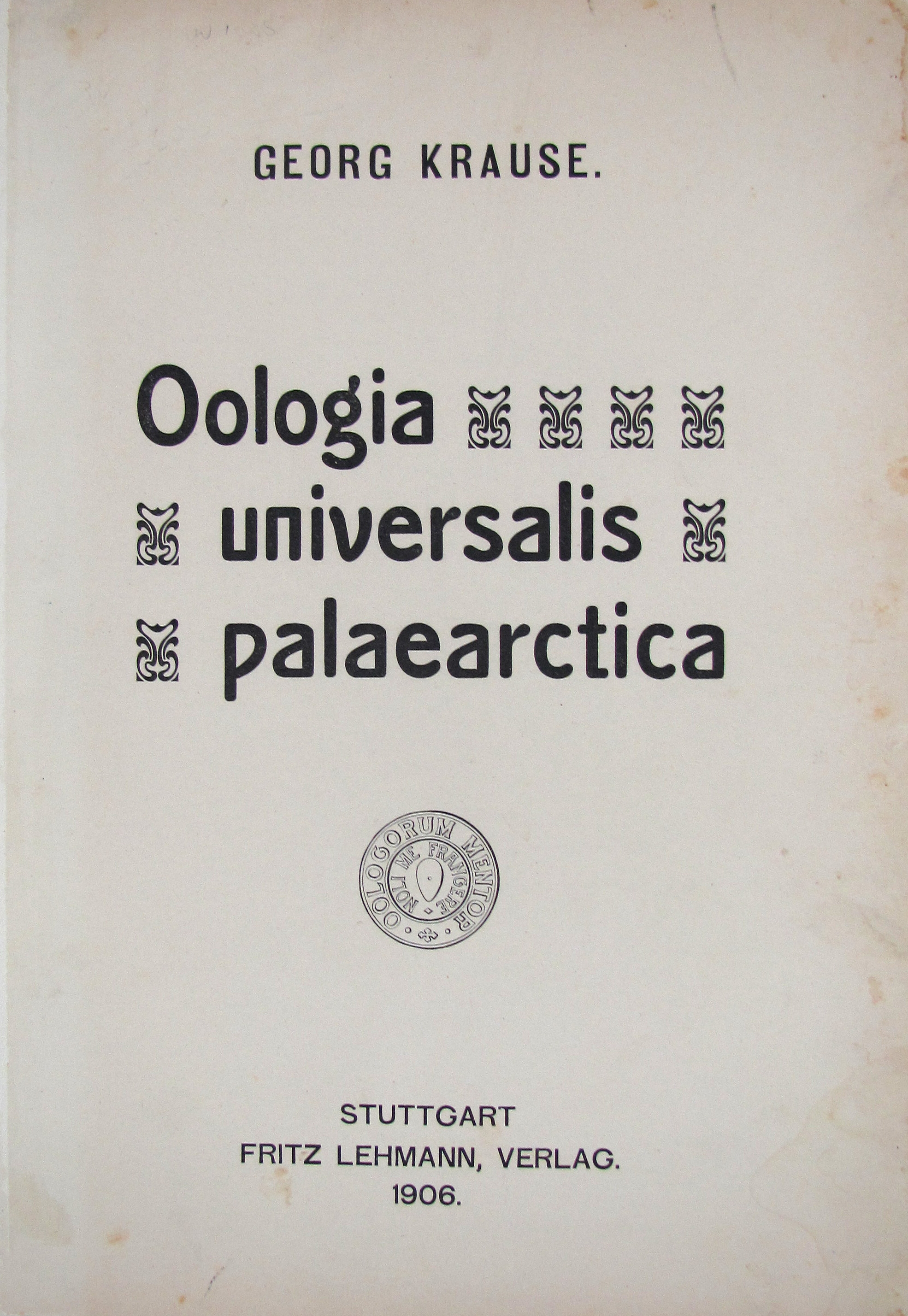
Title page of Oologia universalis palaearctica

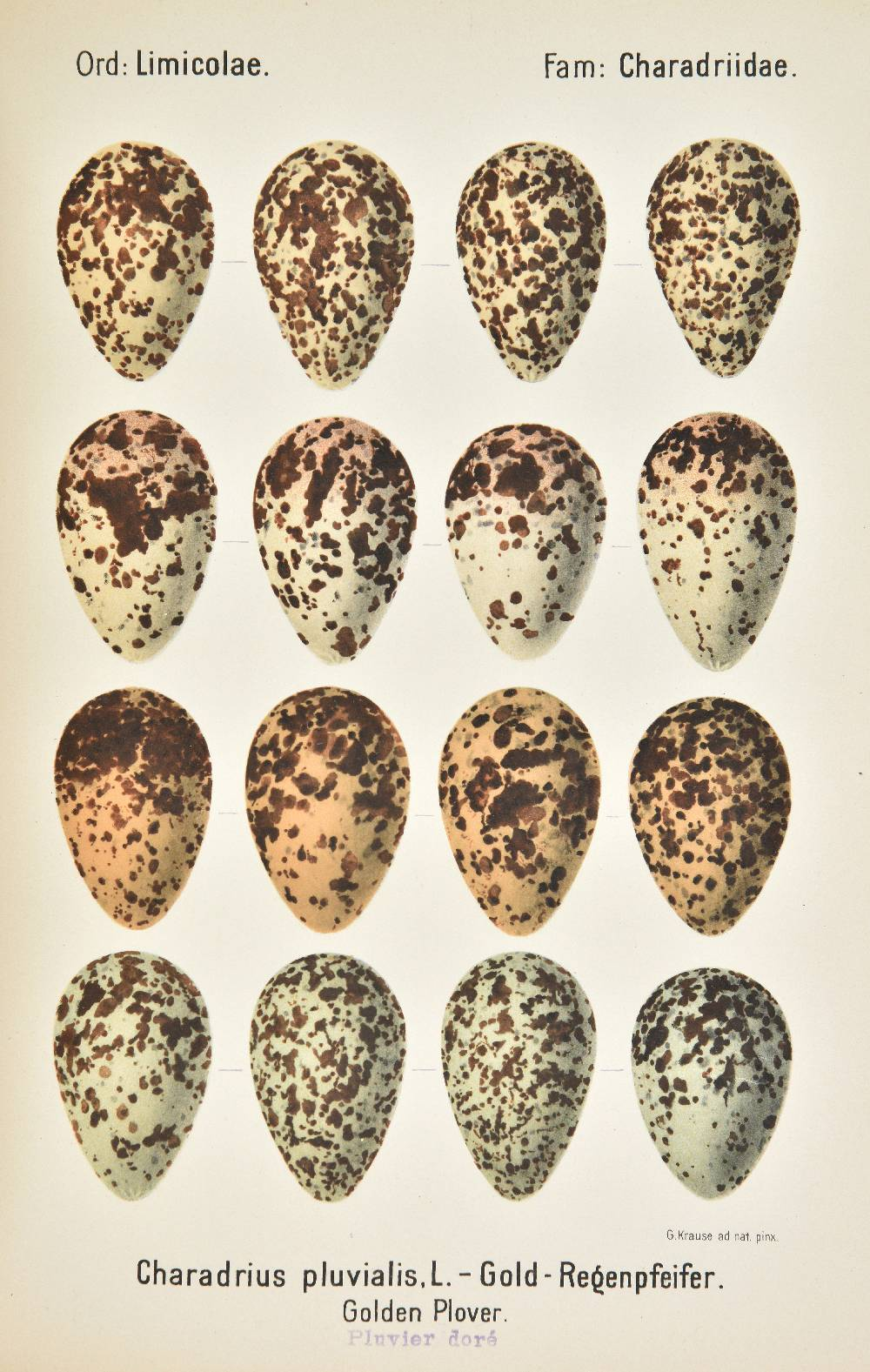
Plate from Oologia universalis palaearctica showing eggs of golden plover

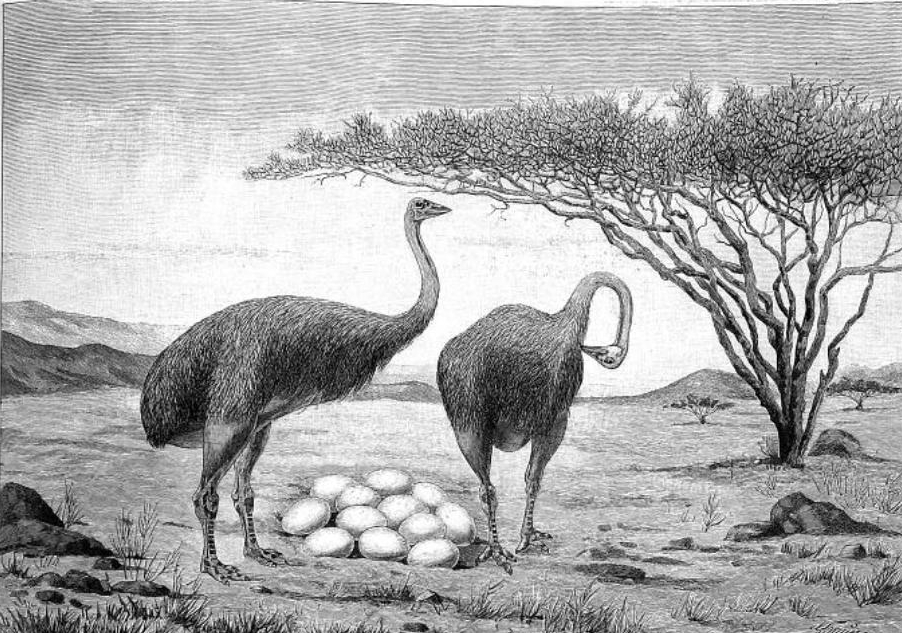
Reconstruction of Aepyornis by Krause, 1900

In 1914 he was concerned by the collection of tern's eggs, especially those of Sandwich tern, being used in large numbers in the Berlin chocolate industry for the production of Easter eggs. His note, with his address at Pankow, Berlin, on the topic was published posthumously in 1919.
