= List of minor Greek mythological figures =

Some persons named in ancient Greek religion and mythology are of minor notability, about whom either nothing or very little is known, aside from any family connections.

== A ==
Name	Ancient Greek	Description
Abarbarea	Ἀβαρβαρέη	the name of several mythological figures
Abaris	Ἄβαρις	the name of several mythological figures
Abas	Ἄβας	the name of several mythological figures
Abderus	Ἄβδηρος	aided Heracles during his eighth labour and was killed by the Mares of Diomedes
Abia	Ἀβία	nursemaid of Glenus, a son of Heracles
Abraxas	Ἀβράξας	name of a divine being in the Greek Magical Papyri
Abrota	Ἀβρώτη	wife of Nisos, king of Megara
Acallaris	Ἀκαλλαρίδος	daughter of Eumedes
Acamas	Ἀκάμας	the name of several mythological figures
Acarnan	Ἀκαρνάν	the name of several mythological figures
Acaste	Ἀκάστη	the name of several mythological figures
Achaeus	Ἀχαιός	the name of several mythological figures
Achates	Ἀχάτης	the name of several mythological figures
Achelois	Ἀχελωίς	the name of several mythological figures
Achilles	Ἀχιλλεύς	a son of Zeus that Aphrodite made hideous
Acmon	Ἄκμων	the name of several mythological figures
Acoetes	Ἀκοίτης	the name of several mythological figures
Aconteus	Ἀκόντιος	the name of several mythological figures
Acontius	Ἀκόντιος	a man from Ceos in love with Cydippe
Akraia	Ἀκραία	the name of several mythological figures
Acraepheus	Ἀκραιφεύς	a son of Apollo
Actaea	Ἀκταία	the name of several mythological figures
Actaeon	Ἀκταίων	a hunter transformed into a stag by Artemis and devoured by his own hounds
Actaeus	Ἀκταῖος	the name of several mythological figures
Actor	Ἄκτωρ	the name of several mythological figures
Admete	Ἀδμήτη	the name of several mythological figures
Admetus	Ἄδμητος	the name of several mythological figures
Adraste	Ἀδρήστη	the name of several mythological figures
Adrasteia	Ἀδράστεια	the name of several mythological figures
Adrastus	Ἄδραστος	the name of several mythological figures
Aegaeon	Αἰγαίων	the name of several mythological figures
Aegiale	Αἰγιάλη/Αἰγιάλεια	the name of several mythological figures
Aegialeus	Αἰγιαλεύς	the name of several mythological figures
Aegimius	Αἰγίμιος	a king of Thessaly and progenitor of the Dorians
Aegle	Αἴγλη	the name of several mythological figures
Aegolius	Αἰγολιός	thief turned into an owl
Aegyptus	Αἴγυπτος	the name of several mythological figures
Aepytus	Αἵπυτος	the name of several mythological figures
Aëdon	Ἀηδών	daughter of Pandareus, changed into a nightingale
Aello	Ἀελλώ	the name of several mythological figures
Aeolus	Αἴολος	the name of several mythological figures
Aenus	Αἶνον	soldier who participated in the Trojan War.
Aepytus	Αἴπυτος	the name of several mythological figures
Aerope	Ἀερόπη	the name of several mythological figures
Aesacus	Αἴσακος	son of Priam who was transformed into a bird
Aesepus	Αἴσηπος	the name of several mythological figures
Aethalides	Αἰθαλίδης	the name of several mythological figures
Aethilla	Αἴθιλλα/Αἴθυλλα	sister of Priam, king of Troy
Aethlius	Ἀέθλιος	first king of Elis
Aethra	Αἴθρα	the name of several mythological figures
Aetolus	Αἰτωλός	the name of several mythological figures
Aëtos	Ἀετός	boy transformed into an eagle by Hera
Agamede	Ἀγαμήδη	the name of several mythological figures
Agamedes	Ἀγαμήδης	a famed architect
Aganippe	Ἀγανίππη	the name of several mythological figures
Agapenor	Ἀγαπήνωρ	leader of the Arcadians during the Trojan War
Agasthenes	Ἀγασθένης	a king of Elis
Agastrophus	Ἀγάστροφος	a Paeonian ally of the Trojans
Agave	Ἀγαύη	the name of several mythological figures
Agelaus	Ἀγέλαος	the name of several mythological figures
Agenor	Ἀγήνωρ	the name of several mythological figures
Aglaea	Ἀγλαία	the name of several mythological figures
Aglaulus	Ἄγλαυρος	the name of several mythological figures
Agreus	Ἀγρεύς	the name of several mythological figures
Agrius	Ἄγριος	the name of several mythological figures
Agron	Ἄγρων	son of Eumelus who was transformed into a plover for disrespecting Hermes, Athena and Artemis
Alabandus	Ἀλάβανδος	the founder of the town of Alabanda
Alastor	Ἀλάστωρ	the name of several mythological figures
Alcaeus	Ἀλκαίος	the name of several mythological figures
Alcander	Ἄλκανδρος	the name of several mythological figures
Alcathous	Ἀλκάθοος	the name of several mythological figures
Alcidice	Ἀλκιδίκη	wife of Salmoneus, king of Elis
Alcimache	Ἀλκιμάχη	the name of several mythological figures
Alcimede	Ἀλκιμέδη	the name of several mythological figures
Alcimedes	Ἀλκιμέδης	the name of several mythological figures
Alcimedon	Ἀλκιμέδων	the name of several mythological figures
Alcimenes	Ἀλκιμένης	the name of several mythological figures
Alcimus	Ἄλκιμος	the name of several mythological figures
Alcinoe	Ἀλκινόη	the name of several mythological figures
Alcinoë	Ἀλκινόη	princess of Corinth
Alcippe	Ἀλκίππη	the name of several mythological figures
Alcis		sister who sacrificed her life for Thebes
Alcmene	Ἀλκμήνη	mother of Heracles
Alcon	Ἄλκων	the name of several mythological figures
Alcyone	Ἀλκυών/Ἀλκυόνη	the wife of Ceyx
Alcyone	Ἀλκυόνη	the daughter of Sciron who was thrown into the sea by her father
Alcyoneus	Ἀλκυονεύς	the name of several mythological figures
Alcyoneus	Ἀλκυονεύς	a young boy chosen by lot to be sacrificed to Sybaris
Alector	Ἀλέκτωρ	the name of several mythological figures
Alectryon	Ἀλεκτρυών	a soldier turned rooster by Ares for failing to warn about Helios
Alexirrhoe	Ἀλεξιῥῤόη	the name of several mythological figures
Alke	Ἀλκή	the name of several mythological figures
Almus	Ἄλμος	one of the sons of Sisyphus
Aloeus	Ἀλωεύς	the name of several mythological figures
Alope	Ἀλόπη	a woman seduced by Poseidon in the form of a kingfisher
Alphesiboea	Ἀλφεσίβοια	the name of several mythological figures
Alphesiboea	Ἀλφεσίβοια	princess of Psophis
Althaea	Ἀλθαία	mother of Meleager
Althaemenes	Ἀλθαιμένης	son of Catreus, king of Crete; it was prophesied he would kill his own father
Amaleus	Ἀμαλεύς	oldest of the Niobids
Amaracus	Ἀμάρακος	son of Cinyras who became marjoram
Amarynceus	Ἀμαρυγκεύς	a chief of the Eleans
Ameinias	Ἀμεινίας	a boy who fell in love with Narcissus
Ampelos	Ἂμπελος	a satyr who was a personification of the grapevine and lover of Dionysus
Amphictyon	Ἀμφικτύων	a king of Athens
Amphidamas	Ἀμφιδάμας	the name of several mythological figures
Amphilochus	Ἀμφίλοχος	the name of several mythological figures
Amphimachus	Ἀμφίμαχος	the name of several mythological figures
Amphinome	Ἀμφινόμη	the name of several mythological figures
Amphinomus	Ἀμφίνομος	a son of Nisos and one of Penelope's suitors during the Odyssey
Amphion	Ἀμφίων)	the name of several mythological figures
Amphissa	Ἄμφισσα	the name of several mythological figures
Amphithea	Ἀμφιθέα	the name of several mythological figures
Amphithemis	Ἀμφίθεμις	the name of several mythological figures
Amphius	Ἄμφιος	the name of several mythological figures
Ampyx	Ἄμπυξ	the name of several mythological figures
Amyclas	Ἀμύκλας	the name of several mythological figures
Amycus	Ἄμυκος	the name of several mythological figures
Amymone	Ἀμυμώνη	the one daughter of Danaus who refused to murder her husband, thus escaping her sisters' punishment
Amyntor	Ἀμύντωρ	the name of several mythological figures
Amythaon	Ἀμυθάων	a son of Cretheus, father of Melampus and Bias
Anagyros	Ἀνάγυρος	local hero of the Anagyrous deme in Attica
Anaxagoras	Ἀναξαγόρας	a king of Argos
Anaxarete	Ἀναξαρέτη	a Cypriot maiden turned to stone by Aphrodite for refusing her suitor's advances
Anaxibia	Ἀναξίβια	the name of several mythological figures
Anaxo	Ἀναξώ	the name of several mythological figures
Ancaeus	Ἀγκαῖος	the name of two separate Argonauts, each of whom was killed by a boar
Anchiale	Ἀγχιάλη	the name of several mythological figures
Anchialus	Ἀγχίαλος	the name of several mythological figures
Anchirroe	Ἀγχιρρόη	the name of several mythological figures
Andraemon	Ἀνδραίμων	the name of several mythological figures
Andreus	Ἀνδρεύς	the name of several mythological figures
Androcleia		sister who sacrificed her life for Thebes
Androgeus	Ἀνδρόγεως	the name of several mythological figures
Anethus	Ἄνηθος	youth who became dill
Antenor	Ἀντήνωρ	a counselor of Priam
Anthas/Anthes	Ἄνθας/Ἄνθης	founder and king of Anthea, a part of what later became Troezen
Anthedon	Ἀνθηδών	the name of several mythological figures
Antheus	Ἀνθεύς	the name of several mythological figures
Anthippe	Ἀνθίππη	noblegirl from Chaonia
Antianeira	Ἀντιανείρη	the name of several mythological figures
Anthus	Ἄνθος	the name of several mythological figures
Anticlea	Ἀντίκλεια	mother of Odysseus
Anticlus	Ἄντικλος	one of the Greek warriors who hid inside the Trojan Horse
Antigone	Ἀντιγόνη	the name of several mythological figures
Antigone	Ἀντιγόνη	Trojan princess who challenged Hera
Antilochus	Ἀντίλοχος	a son of Nestor who participated in the Trojan War
Antimachus	Ἀντίμαχος	the name of several mythological figures
Antinoe	Ἀντινόη	the name of several mythological figures
Antinous	Ἀντίνοος	the name of several mythological figures
Antiochus	Ἀντίοχος	the name of several mythological figures
Antion	Ἀντίων	father of Ixion
Antiope	Ἀντιόπη	the name of several mythological figures
Antiphates	Ἀντιφάτης	the name of several mythological figures
Antiphera	Ἀντιφέρα	Slave woman from Aetolia
Antiphus	Ἄντιφος	the name of several mythological figures
Apemosyne	Ἀπημοσύνη	a daughter of Catreus who was raped by Hermes
Aphareus	Ἀφαρεύς	the name of several mythological figures
Apheidas	Ἀφείδας	the name of several mythological figures
Apis	Ἄπις	the name of several mythological figures
Apisaon	Ἀπισάων	the name of several mythological figures
Apsyrtus	Ἄψυρτος	a son of Aeëtes, murdered by his sister Medea
Arabius	Ἀράβιος	the name of several mythological figures
Arcadia	Ἀρκαδία	the name of several mythological figures
Arcas	Ἀρκάς	son of Zeus and Callisto
Arceophon	Ἀρκεοφῶν	a Phoenician man who committed suicide after being spurned by his beloved
Arcesilaus	Ἀρκεσίλαος	one of the Greek leaders in the Trojan War
Archemachus	Ἀρχέμαχoς	the name of several mythological figures
Architeles	Ἀρχιτέλης	the name of several mythological figures
Areilycus	Ἀρηίλυκος	the name of several mythological figures
Areithous	Ἀρηίθοος	the name of several mythological figures
Aretaona	Ἀρετάων	the name of several mythological figures
Arete	Ἀρήτη	wife of Alcinous
Arethusa	Ἀρέθουσα	the name of several mythological figures
Arethusa	Ἀρέθουσα	mortal lover of Poseidon
Arethusa	Ἀρέθουσα	Ithacan woman who took her life
Aretus	Ἄρητος	the name of several mythological figures
Arganthone	Ἀργανθώνη	famed huntress and lover of Rhesus
Arge	Ἄργη	the name of several mythological figures
Argeus	Ἀργεύς	the name of several mythological figures
Argia	Ἀργεία	the name of several mythological figures
Argiope	Ἀργιόπη	the name of several mythological figures
Argus	Ἄργος	the name of several mythological figures
Argynnus	Ἄργυννος	beloved of Agamemnon
Arisbas	Ἀρίσβας	the name of several mythological figures
Arisbe	Ἀρίσβη	the name of several mythological figures
Aristaeus	Ἀρισταῖος	a giant who became a dung beetle
Aristodemus	Ἀριστόδημος	A descendant of Heracles who helped lead the Dorian Invasion
Aristomachus	Ἀριστόμαχος	the name of several mythological figures
Arsinoe	Ἀρσινόη	the name of several mythological figures
Arsinoe	Ἀρσινόη	princess of Cyprus
Arsinoos	Ἀρσίνοος	the name of several mythological figures
Artemiche	Ἀρτεμίχη	daughter of Clinis and Harpe
Ascalabus	Ἀσκάλαβος	a boy who was changed into a lizard by Demeter
Ascalaphus	Ἀσκάλαφος	the name of several mythological figures
Asius	Ἄσιος	the name of two people who fought during the Trojan War
Asopis	Ἀσωπίς	the name of several mythological figures
Aspalis	Ἀσπαλίς	a maiden of Melite, Phthia associated with a local cult of Artemis
Assaon	Ἀσσάων	Father of Niobe in some versions
Astacus	Ἄστακος	the name of several mythological figures
Asteria	Ἀστερία	the name of several mythological figures
Asterius	Ἀστέριος	the name of several mythological figures
Asterius	Ἀστέριος	giant opponent of Athena and Heracles
Asterodia	Ἀστεροδεία	the name of several mythological figures
Asteropaios	Ἀστεροπαῖος	a Paeonian ally of the Trojans
Asterope	Ἀστεροπή	the name of several mythological figures
Astraeus	Ἀστραῖος	the name of several mythological figures
Astyanassa	Ἀστυάνασσα	Helen of Troy's maid
Astyanax	Ἀστυάναξ	infant son of Hector and Andromache, killed during the Sack of Troy
Astycrateia	Ἀστυκράτεια	the name of several mythological figures
Astydameia	Ἀστυδάμεια	the name of several mythological figures
Astydamia	Ἀστυδάμεια	wife of Acastus of Iolcus
Astynome	Ἀστυνόμη	the name of several mythological figures
Astynous	Ἀστύνοος	the name of several mythological figures
Astyoche	Ἀστυόχη	the name of several mythological figures
Astypalaea	Ἀστυπάλαια	a lover of Poseidon
Athos	Ἄθως	a giant defeated by Poseidon
Atrax	Ἄτραξ	founder of Atracia in Thessaly
Atymnius	Ἀτύμνιος	the name of several mythological figures
Auge	Αὐγή	mother of the hero Telephus
Autochthe	Αὐτόχθη	a daughter of Perseus and Andromeda who married Aegeus
Autolycus	Αὐτόλυκο	a son of Hermes
Automedon	Αὐτομέδων	Achilles' charioteer
Autonoë	Αὐτονόη	the name of several mythological figures
Autonoë	Αὐτονόη	daughter of Cadmus and Harmonia, mother of Actaeon
Autonous	Αὐτόνοος	the name of several mythological figures
Axion	Ἀξιόν)	the name of several mythological figures
Axylus	Ἄξυλος	a participant in the Trojan War who fought on the side of Troy
Azan	Ἀζᾶν	the name of several mythological figures

== B ==
Name	Ancient Greek	Description
Babys	Βάβυς	satyr and brother of Marsyas
Batea	Βάτεια	wife of Dardanus and mother of Ilus
Baton	Βάτων	charioteer of the Amphiaraus
Baubo	Βαυβώ	an old woman who jested with Demeter while the goddess was mourning the loss of Persephone
Baucis	Βαυκίς	a virtuous old woman whose hospitality the gods rewarded
Bianna	Βίαννα	a Cretan woman who migrated to Gaul and disappeared in a chasm of the earth
Bienor	Βιήνωρ	the name of several mythological figures
Biston	Βίστων	a son of Ares and eponym of Bistonia in Thrace
Bolina	Βολίνα	a mortal woman transformed into an immortal nymph by Apollo
Bormus	Βῶρμος	a Mariandynian youth abducted by nymphs
Borus	Βῶρος	the name of several mythological figures
Botres	Βότρης	a son of Eumelus, transformed into a bee-eater
Briseis	Βρισηίς	a princess of Lyrnessus, taken by Achilles as a war prize
Briseus	Βρισεύς	father of Briseis
Broteas	Βροτέας	the name of several mythological figures
Bucolion	Βουκολίων	illegitimate son of the Trojan king Laomedon and half-brother of Priam
Budeia	Βούδεια	name of two separate figures
Bulis	Βοῦλις	mother of Aegypius who accidentally slept with her own son
Buphagus	Βουφάγου	a son of Iapetus
Bura	Βούρα	a daughter of Ion
Butes	Βούτης	the name of several mythological figures
Byblis	Βυβλίς	a woman who fell in love with her twin brother
Byssa	Βύσσα	Koan woman punished by the gods

== C ==
Name	Ancient Greek	Description
Caeneus	Καινεύς	formerly Caenis, a woman who was transformed into a man and became a mighty warrior
Calesius	Καλήσιος	Axylus' charioteer
Caletor	Καλήτωρ	the name of two men involved in the Trojan War
Calais	Κάλαις	an Argonaut and son of Boreas
Calchus	Κάλχος	Daunian man who unsuccessfully courted Circe
Callidice	Καλλιδίκη	queen of Thesprotia and wife of Odysseus
Callirhoë	Καλλιρόη	maiden from Calydon who rejected Coresus
Calliste	Καλλίστη	daughter of Triton who became Santorini
Callithyia	Καλλίθυια	the first priestess of Hera
Calyce	Καλύκη	the name of several mythological figures
Calydon	Καλυδὼν	eponym of Calydon Aetolia
Calydon	Καλυδὼν	a son of Ares who saw Artemis naked
Calypso	Καλυψώ	the name of several mythological figures
Canace	Κανάκη	daughter of Aeolus and lover of Poseidon
Canethus	Κάνηθος	the name of several mythological figures
Canthus	Κάνθος	the name of several mythological figures
Capaneus	Καπανεύς	an arrogant warrior who was struck down by Zeus
Capys	Κάπυς	the name of several mythological figures
Carius	Κάριος	son of Zeus believed to have learned music from nymphs
Carystus	Κάρυστος	son of Chiron
Cassiopeia	Κασσιόπεια	the name of several mythological figures
Cassiopeia	Κασσιόπεια	the mother of Andromeda
Cassiphone	Κασσιφόνη	daughter of Circe and Odysseus
Caucon	Καύκων	the name of several mythological figures
Caunus	Καῦνος	son of Miletus who fled from his twin sister's incestuous advances
Cebriones	Κεβριόνης	illegitimate son of Priam
Celeus	Κελεός	Cretan man who stole from Zeus
Celtine	Κελτίνη	a Celtic princess and lover of Heracles
Cenchreis	Κεγχρηίς	wife of Cinyras and mother of Smyrna/Myrrha
Cerambus	Κέραμβος	a talented yet arrogant singer who was transformed into a beetle
Cerdo	Κερδώ	wife of Phoroneus
Cestrinus	Κεστρῖνος	son of Helenus and Andromache
Ceyx	Κήυξ	husband of Alcyone
Chaeresilaus	Χαιρησίλεω	son of Iasius
Chalciope	Χαλκιόπη	the name of several mythological figures
Chalcodon	Χαλκώδων	the name of several mythological figures
Charops	Χάροψ	the name of several mythological figures
Chelidon	Χελιδών	daughter of Pandareus
Chelone	Χελώνη	changed into a tortoise by Hermes
Chione	Χιόνη	the name of several mythological figures
Chione	Χιόνη	daughter of Boreas and Orithyia
Chione	Χιόνη	mother of Autolycus and Philammon
Chloris	Χλωρίς	the name of several mythological figures
Chromia	Χρωμία	daughter of Itonus
Chrysanthis	Χρυσανθίς	a woman who told Demeter of the abduction of Persephone
Chrysaor	Χρυσάωρ	son of Medusa and brother of Pegasus
Chryseis	Χρυσηίς	a woman enslaved as a war prize by Agamemnon, who was later forced to return her
Chryses	Χρύσης	a priest of Apollo and father of Chryseis
Chrysippe	Χρυσίππη	the name of several mythological figures
Chrysippus	Χρύσιππος	the name of several mythological figures
Chrysippus	Χρύσιππος	son of Pelops and a nymph, abducted by Laius
Chrysothemis	Χρυσόθεμις	the name of several mythological figures
Chrysothemis	Χρυσόθεμις	daughter of Agamemnon and Clytemnestra
Chthonia	Χθωνία	the name of several mythological figures
Chthonius	Χθόνιος	the name of several mythological figures
Chthonophyle	Χθονοφύλη	a daughter of Sicyon and wife of Phlias
Cichyrus	Κίχυρος	Chaonian prince, eponym of the city
Cilix	Κίλιξ	founder of Cilicia
Cilla	Κίλλα	the name of several mythological figures
Cleite	Κλείτη	the name of several mythological figures
Cleitus	Κλεῖτος	the name of several mythological figures
Cleoboea	Κλεόβοια	the name of several mythological figures
Cleoboea	Κλεόβοια	woman who loved and killed Antheus
Cleobule	Κλεοβούλη	the name of several mythological figures
Cleodaeus	Κλεοδαῖος	grandson of Heracles
Cleopatra	Κλεοπάτρη	wife of Meleager
Cleostratus	Κλεόστρατος	youth of Thespiae chosen to be sacrificed to a dragon
Cleothera	Κλεόθηρα	one of the daughters of Pandareus
Clinis	Κλεῖνις	a Babylonian man, transformed into a bird
Clonius	Κλονίος	the name of several mythological figures
Clymene	Κλυμένη	the name of several mythological figures
Clymene	Κλυμένη	consort of Helios and mother of Phaethon
Clymenus	Κλύμενος	the name of several mythological figures
Clytie	Κλυτίη	the name of several mythological figures
Clytie	Κλυτίη	ex-lover of Helios who turned into a heliotrope
Clytius	Κλυτίος	the name of several mythological figures
Clytodora	Κλυτοδώρα	the name of several mythological figures
Clytus	Κλύτος	the name of several mythological figures
Coeranus	Κοίρανος	the name of several mythological figures
Comaetho	Κομαιθώ	the name of several mythological figures
Comaetho	Κομαιθώ	queen of Cilicia
Comaetho	Κομαιθώ	a priestess of Artemis in Patras
Coon	Κόων	son of Antenor who fell against Agamemnon
Copreus	Κοπρεύς	herald of Eurystheus
Coresus	Κόρησος	the name of several mythological figures
Corone	Κορώνη	woman whom Athena transformed into a crow
Coronis	Κορωνίς	the name of several mythological figures
Coronis	Κορωνίς	a princess who cheated on Apollo, mother of Asclepius
Corythus	Κόρυθος	a son of Paris by either Helen or Oenone
Cragaleus	Κραγαλεύς	a man transformed into stone by Apollo
Cratos	Κράτος	god of strength
Crete	Κρήτη	the name of several mythological figures
Creusa	Κρέουσα	the name of several mythological figures
Crino	Κρινώ	the name of several mythological figures
Crisus	Κρῖσος	founder of the town of Crissa
Ctesippus	Κτήσιππος	the name of several mythological figures
Ctesylla	Κτήσυλλα	a maiden of Ioulis
Ctimene	Κτιμένη	younger sister of Odysseus
Cyanippus	Κυάνιππος	the name of several mythological figures
Cyanippus	Κυάνιππος	hunter who accidentally killed his wife
Cychreus	Κυχρεύς	son of Poseidon and Salamis
Cycnus	Κύκνος	the name of several mythological figures, most of whom were transformed into swans
Cydippe	Κυδίππη	the name of several mythological figures
Cydippe	Κυδίππη	queen consort of Rhodes, wife of Cercaphus
Cydon	Κύδων	the name of several mythological figures
Cyllene	Κυλλήνη	nurse of infant Hermes
Cynosura	Κυνοσούρα	nurse of infant Zeus
Cynurus	Κύνουρος	a son of Perseus
Cyparissus	Κυπάρισσος	a boy beloved by Apollo and transformed into a cypress tree after his death

== D ==
Name	Ancient Greek	Description
Daedalion	Δαιδαλίων	a man transformed by Apollo into a hawk
Daedalus	Δαίδαλος	a skilled inventor and artisan
Danaë	Δανάη	daughter of Acrisius and mother of Perseus
Danais	Δαναΐς	the name of several mythological figures
Dascylus	Δάσκυλος	the name of several mythological figures
Deileon	Δηιλέων	the name of several mythological figures
Deimachus	Δηίμαχος	the name of several mythological figures
Deioneus/Deion	Δηιονεύς/Δηίων	the name of several mythological figures
Deiphobus	Δηίφοβος	a son of Priam and Hecuba who fought in the Trojan War
Deipyle	Δηιπύλη	wife of Tydeus and mother of Diomedes
Delphus	Δέλφος	the name of several mythological figures
Demodice	Δημοδίκη	the name of several mythological figures
Demonassa	Δημώνασσα	the name of several mythological figures
Demonice	Δημονίκη	the name of several mythological figures
Demophon of Elaeus	Δημοφῶν	a king of Elaeus in the Thracian Chersonnese
Demophon of Eleusis	Δημοφῶν	a son of Celeus, king of Eleusis, whom Demeter attempted and failed to immortalize
Deucalion	Δευκαλίων	survivor of the Deluge
Dexamenus	Δεξάμενος	the name of several mythological figures
Dia	Δία	wife of Ixion and mother of Pirithoos
Dias	Δίας	the name of two mythological figures
Dictys	Δίκτυς	the name of several mythological figures
Dimoetes	Διμοίτης	brother of Troezen, fell in love with a corpse
Diocles	Διοκλῆς	the name of several mythological figures
Diomede	Διομήδη	the name of several mythological figures
Diomus	Δίομος	the name of several mythological figures
Dione	Διώνη	the name of several mythological figures
Dirce	Δίρκη	wife of Lycus
Dius	Δῖος	the name of several mythological figures
Dolius	Δολίος	a slave of Penelope
Dolon	Δόλων	a fast runner who fought for Troy in the Trojan War
Dolops	Δόλοψ	the name of several mythological figures
Dolus		a apprentice of Prometheus
Dorus	Δῶρος	progenitor of the Dorians
Dotis	Δωτίδος	the name of several mythological figures
Dryas	Δρύας	the name of several mythological figures
Dryope	Δρυόπη	a woman transformed into a black poplar
Dymas	Δύμας	the name of several mythological figures

== E ==
Name	Ancient Greek	Description
Echemeia	Ἐχέμεια	woman killed by Artemis for neglecting her worship
Echion	Ἐχίων	the name of several mythological figures
Echetlus/Ekhetlaios	Ἔχετλος/Ἐχετλαῖος	an Athenian mythical hero fought in the Battle of Marathon
Eioneus	Ἠιονεύς	the name of several mythological figures
Elaea	Ἐλαία	Athenian athlete murdered by jealous rivals
Elate	Ἐλάτη	sister of the Aloadae, became a tall tree
Electryone	Ἠλεκτρυώνη	a daughter of Helios and Rhode
Eleius	Ἠλεῖος	the name of several mythological figures
Eleusis	Ἐλευσίς	eponymous hero of the town of Eleusis
Eleuther	Ἐλευθήρ	the name of several mythological figures
Elpenor	Ἐλπήνωρ	a crew member of Odysseus, who died in an accident; his shade approached Odysseus in the Underworld to beg him for a proper burial
Elymus	Ἔλυμος	progenitor of the Elymians
Emathion	Ἠμαθίων	the name of several mythological figures
Enalus	Ἔναλος	a man from Lesbos
Enarete	Ἐναρέτη	wife of Aeolus
Endeis/Endais	Ἐνδηίς/Ἐνδαίς	daughter of Chiron
Endymion	Ἐνδυμίων	eternally sleeping lover of the moon goddess Selene
Enyeus	Ἐνυεύς	the name of several mythological figures
Epeius	Ἐπειός	the name of several mythological figures
Epicasta	Ἐπικάστη	the name of several mythological figures
Epidaurus	Ἐπίδαυρος	eponymous hero of the city Epidaurus
Epipole	Ἐπιπολή	a woman that went to Trojan War in disguise of a man
Epirus	Ἤπειρος	daughter of Agave and Echion, after whom the region of Epirus was named
Epistrophus	Ἐπίστροφος	the name of several mythological figures
Episteme	ἐπιστήμη	Episteme is a personification of knowledge or science
Epochus	Ἔποχος	the name of several mythological figures
Epopeus	Ἐπωπεύς	the name of several mythological figures
Ereuthalion	Ἐρευθαλίων	the name of several mythological figures
Ergiskos	Ἐργίσκος,	Founder of Ergisce
Eribotes	Ἐρυβώτης	one of the Argonauts
Erinoma	n/a	Cypriot woman raped by Adonis
Eriopis	Ἐριῶπις	the name of several mythological figures
Eriphyle	Ἐριφύλη	mother of Alcmaeon and wife of Amphiaraus
Erymanthus	Ἐρύμανθος	the name of several mythological figures
Erythras	Ἐρύθραν	the name of several mythological figures
Euippe	Εὐίππη	the name of several mythological figures
Euchenor	Εὐχήνωρ	the name of several mythological figures
Eulimene	Εὐλιμήνη	a Cretan girl who was put to death after having an affair with a man other than her betrothed
Eumaeus	Εὔμαιος	Odysseus' loyal swineherd
Eumedes	Εὐμήδης	the name of several mythological figures
Eunostus	Εὔνοστος	a Boeotian hero
Euphorion	Εὐφορίων	son of Achilles and Helen
Europs	Εὕρωψ	the name of several mythological figures
Euryalus	Εὐρύαλος	the name of several mythological figures
Euryanassa	Εὐρυάνασσα	the name of several mythological figures
Eurybates	Εὐρυβάτης	herald of the Greek armies and squire to Odysseus during the Trojan War
Eurycleia	Εὐρύκλεια	the name of several mythological figures
Eurycyda	Εὐρυκύδα	a lover of Poseidon
Eurydamas	Εὐρυδάμας	the name of several mythological figures
Eurydice	Εὐρυδίκη	the name of several mythological figures
Eurylochus	Εὐρύλοχος	the name of several mythological figures
Eurymachus	Εὐρύμαχος	the name of several mythological figures
Eurymedon	Εὐρυμέδοντα	the name of several mythological figures
Eurymedousa	Εὐρυμέδουσα	the name of several mythological figures
Eurypyle	Εὐρυπύλη	the name of several mythological figures
Eurypylus	Εὐρύπυλος	the name of several mythological figures
Euryte	Εὐρύτη	the name of several mythological figures
Eurythemis	Εὐρυθέμιδος	the name of several mythological figures
Eurythemista	Εὐρυθεμίστη	the name of several mythological figures
Eurytion	Εὐρυτίων	the name of several mythological figures
Eurytus	Εὔρυτος	the name of several mythological figures
Euthynicus	Εὐθύνικος	hunter who broke his vows and slept with Rhodopis
Euxynthetus	Εὐξύνθετος	Cretan man, in love with Leucocomas
Evaechme	Εὐαίχμη	the name of several mythological figures
Euippos	Εὔιππος	the name of several mythological figures

== G ==
Name	Ancient Greek	Description
Galanthis/Galinthias	Γαλανθίς/Γαλινθιάς	servant and friend of Alcmene, who foiled Hera's plan to prevent Heracles' birth and was transformed into a weasel in punishment
Gale	Γαλῆ	witch turned by Hecate into a polecat
Gerana	Γεράνα	a Pygmy queen changed into a crane
Golgos	Γόλγος	son of Adonis and Aphrodite
Gorge	Γόργη	the name of several mythological figures
Gorgo	Γοργόνος	the name of several mythological figures
Gorgophone	Γοργοφόνη	daughter of Perseus and Andromeda
Guneus	Γουνεὐς	the name of several mythological figures

== H ==
Name	Ancient Greek	Description
Haemon	Αἵμων	the name of several mythological figures
Halaesus	Ἅλαισος	the name of several mythological figures
Halia of Rhodes	Ἁλία	queen of Rhodes
Halirrhothius	Ἁλιρρόθιος	a son of Poseidon who was killed by Ares
Harmothoë	Ἁρμοθόη	wife of Pandareus
Harpalion	Ἁρπαλίων	the name of several mythological figures
Harpalyce	Ἁρπαλύκη	the name of several mythological figures
Harpalyce	Ἁρπαλύκη	daughter and wife of Clymenus
Harpalyce	Ἁρπαλύκη	Thracian princess turned bandit
Harpalycus	Ἁρπάλυκος	the name of several mythological figures
Harpasus	Ἄρπασος	son of Clinis and Harpe
Harpe	Ἄρπη	wife of Clinis and mother of his children
Hecamede	Ἑκαμήδη	daughter of Arsinoos who was captured and given to Nestor as a servant
Heleus	Ἕλειος	a son of Perseus and Andromeda
Hemithea	Ἡμιθέα	princess of the Island of Naxos who leapt into the sea to escape her father's wrath; Apollo transformed her into demi-goddess
Henioche	Ἡνιόχη	the name of several mythological figures
Herippe	Ἑρίππη	a woman from Miletus, abducted by the Gauls
Hermippe	Ἑρμίππη	wife of Orchomeus and mother of Minyas by Poseidon
Hero	Ἡρώ	priestess of Aphrodite who inadvertedly caused her lover Leandros' death and then died of suicide by throwing herself into the water
Hesychia	Ἡσυχείη	personification of quiet and silence
Hierax	Ἰέραξ	the name of several mythological figures
Hilaeira	Ἱλάειρα	one of the Leucippides, wife of Castor
Hippocoon	Ἱπποκόων	the name of several mythological figures
Hippodamas	Ἱπποδάμας	the name of several mythological figures
Hippodamia	Ἱπποδάμεια	the name of several mythological figures
Hippolytus	Ἱππόλυτος	the name of several mythological figures, including a son of Theseus
Hippotes	Ἱππότης	the name of several mythological figures
Hippothoe	Ἱπποθόη	the name of several mythological figures
Hippothous	Ἱππόθοος	the name of several mythological figures
Hodites	Ὁδίτης	the name of several mythological figures
Hodoedocus	Ὁδοίδοκος	son of Cynus, father of Oileus
Hyacinthus	Ὑάκινθος	a lover of Apollo changed into a flower
Hyacinthus of Lacedaemon	Ὑάκινθος	father of four daughters who were sacrificed to avert plague
Hyamus	Ὕαμος	maternal grandfather of Delphus
Hyettus	Ὕηττος	an Argive, reputedly the first person to ever commit murder over adultery
Hylas	Ὕλας	arms bearer to Heracles
Hyllus	Ὕλλος	son of Heracles and Deianira
Hymnus	Ὕμνος	Hunter in love with Nicaea
Hyperbius	Ὑπέρβιος	the name of several mythological figures
Hyperenor	Ὑπερήνωρ	the name of several mythological figures
Hyperes	Ὑπέρης	the name of several mythological figures
Hyperippe	Ὑπερίππη	the name of several mythological figures
Hypermnestra	Ὑπερμνήστρα	the name of several mythological figures
Hyperochus	Ὑπέροχος	the name of several mythological figures
Hyperphas	Ὑπέρφαντος	the name of several mythological figures
Hypsenor	Ὑψήνωρ	the name of several mythological figures
Hyrmine	Ὑρμίνη	the wife of Phorbas
Hyrnetho	Ὑρνηθώ	the wife of Deiphontes

== I ==
Name	Ancient Greek	Description
Ialmenus	Ἰάλμενος	a son of Ares who sailed with the Argonauts
Iasus	Ἴασος	the name of several mythological figures
Icarius	Ἰκάριος	the name of several mythological figures
Icarus	Ἴκαρος	a son of Daedalus, who fell to his death
Ictinus	Ἴκτινος	a man who tried to rape his daughter Side and became a kite bird
Idaea	Ἰδαία	wife of the seer Phineus
Iliona	Ἰλιόνη	a daughter of Priam and wife of Polymestor
Ilioneus	Ἰλιονεύς	the name of several mythological figures
Imbrius	Ἴμβριος	a son-in-law of Priam
Ino	Ἰνώ	a Theban princess who became the sea goddess Leucothea
Iodame	Ἰοδάμαν	daughter of Itonus, turned to stone by Athena
Iolaus	Ἰόλαος	a nephew of Heracles who aided his uncle in one of his Labors
Iole	Ἰόλη	a daughter of Eurytus
Ion	Ἴων	a son of Apollo and Creusa, wife of Xuthus
Iphianassa	Ἰφιάνασσα	the name of several mythological figures
Iphianeira	Ἰφιάνειρα	the name of several mythological figures
Iphicles	Ἰφικλῆς	the name of several mythological figures
Iphidamas	Ἰφιδάμας	the name of several mythological figures
Iphimedeia	Ἰφιμέδεια	a lover of Poseidon
Iphinoe	Ἰφινόη	the name of several mythological figures
Iphitus	Ἴφιτος	the name of several mythological figures
Iphthime	Ἰφθίμη	the name of several mythological figures
Irus	Ἶρος	the name of several mythological figures
Itonus	Ἴτωνος	the name of several mythological figures
Itylus	Ἴτυλος	The son of Aëdon and Zethus
Itys	Ἴτυς	The son of Procne and Tereus

== L ==
Name	Ancient Greek	Description
Lamedon	Λαμέδων	a son of Coronus of Sicyon
Leucothea	Λευκοθέα	originally a mortal queen, transformed into a sea goddess who aids sailors
Lampus	Λάμπος	the name of several mythological figures
Laodamas	Λαοδάμας	the name of several mythological figures
Laodamia	Λαοδάμεια	the name of several mythological figures
Laodice	Λαοδίκη	the name of several mythological figures
Laonome	Λαονόμη	the name of several mythological figures
Leontichus	Λεόντιχος	star-crossed lover stoned to death for his affair with the betrothed Rhodine
Laophoon	Λαοφόων	a Paeonian ally of the Trojans in the Trojan War
Laothoe	Λαοθόη	the name of several mythological figures
Lapithes	Λαπίθης	the name of several mythological figures
Larissa	Λάρισα	woman raped by her father
Leandros	Λέανδρος	lover of Hero who died trying to make his way to her tower in the middle of swimming across a river after her torch went out
Leitus	Λήιτος	a leader of the Achaean forces during the Trojan War
Lelante	Ληλάντη	mother of Philaeus and Megaletor
Leos	Λεώς	name of two Attic heroes
Lepreus	Λεπρεύς	a grandson of Poseidon and an enemy of Heracles
Lethaea	Ληθαία	a woman turned into stone for her vanity
Leucippus	Λεύκιππος	the name of several mythological figures
Leucippus	Λεύκιππος	founder of Magnesia on the Maeander
Leucon	Λεύκων	the name of several mythological figures
Leucone	Λευκώνη	woman devoured by her husband's hounds
Leuconoe	Λευκονόη	the name of several mythological figures
Leucophrye	Λευκοφρύνη	daughter of Mandrolytus; she betrayed her city for the love of a man
Leucothoe	Λευκοθόη	daughter of Orchamus, transformed into frankincense tree
Leucus	Λεῦκος	the name of several mythological figures
Libanus	Λίβανος	youth transformed into a shrub or tree
Lilaeus	Λίλαιος	Indian worshipper of Selene
Lityerses	Λιτυέρσης	a son of Midas killed by Heracles, and eponym of a kind of reaping songs
Lophis	Λόφις	the young son of a Boeotian king
Lycaon	Λυκάων	the name of several mythological figures
Lycaste	Λυκάστη	the name of several mythological figures
Lycastus	Λύκαστος	the name of several mythological figures
Lycian peasants	Λύκιοι	people who did not offer hospitality to Leto
Lycius	Λύκιος	transformed by Apollo into a white raven, later a black one
Lyco and Orphe	Λυκώ καἰ Ὄρφη	Laconian girls whom Dionysus drove mad
Lycorus	Λυκωρεύς	the name of several mythological figures
Lycurgus	Λυκοῦργος	the name of several mythological figures
Lynceus	Λυγκεύς	king of Argos
Lysianassa	Λυσιάνασσα	the name of several mythological figures
Lysimache	Λυσιμάχη	the name of several mythological figures
Lysippe	Λυσίππη	the name of several mythological figures

== M ==
Name	Ancient Greek	Description
Macaria	Μακαρία	a daughter of Hades
Macaria	Μακαρία	a daughter of Heracles
Machaon	Μαχάων	a physician and son of Asclepius who fought on the side of the Greeks in the Trojan War
Macris	Μακρἰς	a daughter of Aristaeus
Maeon	Μαίων	the name of several mythological figures
Magnes	Μάγνης	the name of several mythological figures
Mantius	Μάντιος	a son of Melampus and father of Cleitus
Mariandynus	Μαριανδυνός	eponymous hero of the Mariandyni
Mardylas	Μαρδύλας	shepherd from Dodona
Mecisteus	Μηκιστεύς	the name of several mythological figures
Mecon	Μήκων	lover of Demeter, turned into a poppy
Meda	Μήδα	the name of several mythological figures
Medôn	Μέδων	the name of several mythological figures
Megaletor	Μεγαλήτωρ	a son of Munichus and Lelante
Megapenthes	Μεγαπένθης	the name of several mythological figures
Melanion	Μελανίων	son of Amphidamas and husband of Atalanta
Melanippus	Μελάνιππος	the name of several mythological figures
Melantho	Μελανθώ	the name of several mythological figures
Melas	Μέλας	the name of several mythological figures
Meles	Μέλης	the name of several mythological figures
Meliboea	Μελίβοια	the name of several mythological figures
Meliboea	Μελίβοια	star-crossed lover of Alexis
Melicertes	Μελικέρτης	son of Athamas and Ino who was transformed into the marine god Palaemon
Melite	Μελίτη	the name of several mythological figures
Melus	Μήλος	the name of several mythological figures
Melus	Μήλος	childhood companion of Adonis, became an apple
Memphis	Μέμφις	the name of several mythological figures
Menippe	Μενίππη	a daughter of Orion who was transformed into a comet
Messapian shepherds	Μεσσάπιοι ποιμένες	One or more shepherds who insulted the nymphs
Messene	Μεσσήνη	an ambitious Argive princess for whom Messenia was named
Metaneira	Μετάνειρα	wife of Celeus, king of Eleusis
Menephron	Μενέφρων	man who slept with both his mother and daughter
Menestratus	Μενέστρατος	the name of several mythological figures
Menestratus	Μενέστρατος	Thespian man who sacrificed himself to kill a dragon
Metioche	Μενίππη	a daughter of Orion who was transformed into a comet
Meropis	Μεροπίς	Koan woman punished by the gods
Merops	Μέροψ	king of Aethiopia and husband of Clymene
Mestor	Μήστωρ	the name of several mythological figures
Mestra	Μήστρα	daughter of Erysichthon who possessed the gift of shape-shifting
Miletus	Μίλητος	a son of Apollo and founder of the city Miletus
Minyas	Μινύας	the founder of Orchomenus in Boeotia
Molurus	Μόλουρος	the man killed by Hyettus
Munichus	Μούνιχος	the name of several mythological figures
Myia	Μυῖα	a girl in love with Endymion
Myrice	Μυρίκη	princess from Cyprus
Myrina	Μύρινα	the name of several mythological figures
Myrina	Μύρινα	priestess of Aphrodite
Myrmex	Μύρμηξ	woman who transformed into an ant
Myrmidon	Μυρμιδόνος	the eponymous progenitor of the Myrmidons
Myrmidone	Μυρμιδών	the name of several mythological figures
Myrrha	Μύρρα	the mother of Adonis
Myrsine	Μυρσίνη	Athenian athlete
Myrtilus	Μυρτίλος	the charioteer of Oenomaus
Myrto	Μυρτώ	the name of several mythological figures
Mysius	Μύσιος	an Argive who offered hospitality to Demeter
Mytilene	Μυτιλήνη	the name of several mythological figures

== N ==
Name	Ancient Greek	Description
Naïs	Ναΐς	the name of several mythological figures
Narcissus	Νάρκισσος	a young man who fell in love with his own reflection
Naubolus	Ναύβολος	the name of several mythological figures
Nausicaa	Ναυσικάα	a Phaeacian princess who aided Odysseus
Nausithous	Ναυσίθοος	the name of several mythological figures
Neaera	Νέαιρα	one of the wives of Helios
Neis	Νηίς	daughter of either Aëdon and Zethus or Niobe and Amphion
Neleus	Νηλεύς	king of Pylos
Neophron	Νεόφρων	son of Timandra
Neoptolemus	Νεοπτόλεμος	a son of Achilles
Nicippe	Νικίππη	the name of several mythological figures
Nireus	Νιρεύς	the name of several mythological figures
Nyctaea	Νυκταία	a woman transformed by Athena into an owl
Nycteus	Νυκτεύς	the name of several mythological figures
Nycteus	Νυκτεύς	king of Thebes and father of Antiope
Nyctimene	Νυκτιμένη	a woman transformed by Athena into an owl
Nyctimus	Νύκτιμος	a son of Lycaon who was killed and served up as a meal to Zeus

== O ==
Name	Ancient Greek	Description
Ochne	Ὄχνη	girl in love with Eunostus
Ocyrhoë	Ὠκυρόη	Samian girl kidnapped by Apollo during a festival of Artemis
Oechalides	Οἰχαλίδες	two women transformed into fir trees
Oenoe	Οἰνόη	the name of several mythological figures
Oenone	Οἰνώνη	the first wife of Paris, whom he abandoned in favour of Helen
Oenotrus	Οἴνωτρος	a son of Lycaon
Olenus	Ὄλενος	the name of several mythological figures
Omphale	Ὀμφάλη	a queen of Lydia to whom Heracles was required to become a slave for the period of a year
Oncius	Ὄγκιος	a son of Apollo and eponymous hero of Oncium, Arcadia
Oneiros		A son of Achilles with Deidamia, according to Ptolemy Hephaestion (as cited by Photius), and brother of Neoptolemus. Orestes did not recognize him and killed him in Phocis in a fight for a place to pitch a tent.
Orchomenus	Ὀρχομενός	the name of several mythological figures
Orestheus	Ὀρεσθεύς	the name of several mythological figures
Orion	Ὠρίων	a hunter whom Zeus placed among the stars as the constellation of Orion
Orithyia	Ὠρείθυια	an Athenian princess abducted by Boreas and made the goddess of cold, gusty mountain winds
Ormenus	Ὄρμενος	the name of several mythological figures
Ornytion	Ὀρνύτιων	a son of Sisyphus and ruler over Corinth
Ornytus	Ὄρνυτόν	the name of several mythological figures
Orsilochus	Ὀρσίλοχος	the name of several mythological figures
Ortygius	Ὀρτύγιος	a son of Clinis and Harpe
Othryoneus	Ὀθρυονεύς	a suitor of Cassandra
Oxylus	Ὄξυλος	the name of several mythological figures

== P ==
Name	Ancient Greek	Description
Paeon of Paeonia	Παίων	the father of Agastrophus
Paeon of Messenia	Παίων	the son of Antilochus
Paeon of Elis	Παίων	eponym of Paeonia
Paeon (son of Poseidon)	Παίων	by Helle, sister of Phrixus
Palaemon	Παλαίμων	the name of several mythological figures
Pallene	Παλλήνη	the name of several mythological figures
Pallene	Παλλήνη	princess of Odomantice, daughter of Sithon
Pandaie	Πανδαίη	a daughter of Heracles in India
Pandareus	Πανδάρεως	a friend of Tantalus who got involved with his impious deeds
Pandarus	Πάνδαρος	a Trojan archer who fought in the Trojan War
Pandora	Πανδώρα	the name of several mythological figures
Panopeus	Πανοπεύς	a son of Phocus
Panthous	Πάνθοος	an elder of Troy
Paraebius	Παραίβιος	servant of king Phineus
Paris	Πάρις	a son of Priam whose abduction of Helen resulted in the Trojan War
Parthenos	Παρθένος	princess of the Island of Naxos who leapt into the sea to escape her father's wrath; and was transformed by Apollo her into a demi-goddess
Parthenopaeus	Παρθενοπαῖος	one of the Seven Against Thebes
Patroclus	Πάτροκλος	a comrade of Achilles who was killed by Hector during the Trojan War
Peirous	Πείροος	a Thracian ally of the Trojans
Peisenor	Πεισήνωρ	the name of several mythological figures
Peisidice	Πεισιδίκη	the name of several mythological figures
Peisistratus	Πεισίστρατος	the youngest son of Nestor
Pelasgus	Πελασγός	the name of several mythological figures
Pelia	Πέλεια	woman from Cyprus and wife of Melos
Pelopia	Πελόπεια	the name of several mythological figures
Peneleos	Πηνελέως	an Achaean soldier in the Trojan War
Pentheus	Πενθεύς	king of Thebes who denied Dionysus' divinity
Penthilus	Πένθιλος	the name of several mythological figures
Periboea	Περίβοια	the name of several mythological figures
Periboea	Περίβοια	mother of Ajax the Great
Perigune	Περιγούνη	daughter of Sinis and lover of Theseus
Perileos	Περίλεως	the name of several mythological figures
Perimede	Περιμήδη	the name of several mythological figures
Perimedes	Περιμήδης	the name of several mythological figures
Periphas	Περίφᾱς	the name of several mythological figures
Periphetes	Περιφήτης	the name of several mythological figures
Periphetes	Περιφήτης	Epidaurian bandit slain by Theseus
Peristera	Περιστερά	nymph who helped Aphrodite win a contest
Peristhenes	Περισθένης	the name of several mythological figures
Perses	Πέρσης	the name of several mythological figures
Petraea	Πετραίη	the name of several mythological figures
Phaedimus	Φαίδιμος	the name of several mythological figures
Phaenops	Φαῖνοψ	the name of several mythological figures
Phaethon	Φαέθων	son of Helios who drove the sun chariot
Phalanthus	Φάλανθος	the name of several mythological figures
Phalanx	Φάλαγξ	the brother of Arachne
Phalerus	Φάληρος	a son of Alcon who sailed with the Argonauts
Phaon	Φάων	a ferryman from Lesbos who ferried Aphrodite
Pharis	Φᾶρις	a son of Hermes and founder of Pharae in Messene
Phasis	Φᾶσις	a son of Helios who killed his mother and drowned himself
Phayllus	Φάυλλος	owner of the cursed necklace of Harmonia
Phemius	Φήμιος	an Ithacan poet who performs in the house of Odysseus
Phene	Φήνη	wife of Periphas
Pheres	Φέρης	the name of several mythological figures
Phialo	Φιαλώ	a lover of Heracles
Philaeus	Φιλαῖος	a man who became an unidentified bird
Philemon	Φιλήμων	a virtuous old man who was rewarded by Zeus
Philoctetes	Φιλοκτήτης	a famed archer who participated in the Trojan War
Philonome	Φιλονόμη	wife of Cycnus, accused her stepson Tennes of rape
Phlias	Φλίας	a son of Dionysus who sailed with the Argonauts
Phocus	Φῶκος	the name of several mythological figures
Phoebe	Φοίβη	the name of several mythological figures
Phoenix	Φοῖνιξ	the name of several mythological figures
Phorbas	Φόρβας	the name of several mythological figures
Phorcys	Φόρκυς	a Phrygian ally of Priam in the Trojan War
Phrastor	Φράστωρ	the name of several mythological figures
Phrixus	Φρίξος	a son of Athamas and Nephele, rescued by Chrysomallus, the ram with the golden fleece
Phrontis	Φρονίς	a son of Phrixus who sailed with the Argonauts
Phthia	Φθία	the name of several mythological figures
Phthia	Φθία	mistress of Amyntor and his son Phoenix
Phylacus	Φύλακος	the name of several mythological figures
Phylas	Φύλας	the name of several mythological figures
Phyleus	Φυλεύς	a son of Augeas
Phyllis	Φυλλίς	the wife of Demophon of Athens
Phylonoe	Φυλονόη	a daughter of Tyndareus and Leda, made immortal by Artemis
Physadeia	Φυσάδεια	the name of several mythological figures
Physcoa	Φυσκόα	a member of the Sixteen Women and lover of Dionysus
Phytalus	Φύταλος	an Attic hero encountered by Demeter
Picolous	Πικόλοος	giant who attacked Circe
Pieria	Πιερία	the name of several mythological figures
Pieria	Πιερία	one of the multiple wives of King Danaus of Libya
Pisidice	Πεισιδίκη	princess of Methymna who loved Achilles
Platanus	Πλάτανος	sister of the Aloadae, became a tall tree
Pleuron	Πλευρῶνος	the eponym of Pleuron, Aetolia
Plexippus	Πλήξιππος	the name of several mythological figures
Podalirius	Ποδαλείριος	a healer and son of Asclepius who participated in the Trojan War
Polites	Πολίτης	the name of several mythological figures
Polyboea	Πολύβοια	the name of several mythological figures
Polycaon	Πολυκάων	the name of several mythological figures
Polycaste	Πολυκάστη	the name of several mythological figures
Polydorus	Πολύδωρος	the name of several mythological figures
Polyidus	Πολύειδος	a seer from Corinth
Polymele	Πολυμήλη	the name of several mythological figures
Polymele	Πολυμήλη	daughter of Aeolus and lover of Odysseus
Polypheides	Πολυφείδης	the name of several mythological figures
Polystratus	Πολύστρατος	a youth of Dyme, Achaea
Polytechnus	Πολύτεχνος	husband of Aëdon, became a pelican or woodpecker
Polyxenus	Πολύξενος	the name of several mythological figures
Polyxo	Πολυξώ	the name of several mythological figures
Polyxo	Πολυξώ	queen of Rhodes and old friend of Helen
Pompilus	Πομπίλος	man who was turned into a pilot fish
Praxithea	Πραξιθέα	the name of several mythological figures
Presbon	Πρέσβων	the name of several mythological figures
Proclia	Πρόκλεια	daughter of Laomedon, sister of Priam and wife of Cycnus
Procne	Πρόκνη	princess of Athens, killed her son and became a nightingale
Procrustes	Προκρούστης	a rogue smith and bandit from Attica who attacked people
Proetids	Προιτίδες	the three daughters of king Proetus who went mad
Promedon	Προμέδων	possibly a follower of Orpheus
Pronax	Πρῶναξ	a brother of Adrastus
Prosymnus	Πρόσυμνος	a shepherd who aided Dionysus in rescuing Semele from Hades
Protesilaus	Πρωτεσίλᾱος	the first Greek soldier to die at Troy
Protogeneia	Πρωτογένεια	the name of several mythological figures
Prothoenor	Προθοήνωρ	one of the Greek leaders in the Trojan War
Psophis	Ψῶφις	the name of several mythological figures
Pterelaos	Πτερέλαος	the name of several mythological figures
Ptous	Πτῶος	eponym of Mount Ptous in Boeotia
Pygmalion	Πυγμαλίων	a sculptor who fell in love with his own creation
Pylaeus	Πύλαιος	a Pelasgian ally of the Trojans
Pylaemenes	Πυλαιμένης	an Enetian ally of the Trojans
Pyraechmes	Πυραίχμης	a Paeonian ally of the Trojans
Pyramus	Πύραμος	tragic lover of Thisbe, on whom Shakespeare's Romeo is based
Pyrene	Πυρήνη	eponymous heroine of the Pyrenees
Pyrrha	Πύῤῥα	the wife of Deucalion
Pyrrhus	Πύρρος	man who tried to assault Rhea

== R ==
Name	Ancient Greek	Description
Rarus	Ρᾶρος	a possible father of Triptolemus
Rhadine	Ῥαδίνη	betrothed star-crossed lover stoned to death for her affair with Leontichus
Rhodope	Ῥοδόπη	the name of several mythological figures
Rhodope	Ῥοδόπη	queen of Thrace, wife of Haemus
Rhodopis	Ῥοδῶπις	huntress that accompanied Artemis
Rhoecus	Ῥοῖκος	the name of several mythological figures
Rhoecus	Ῥοῖκος	man who saved a nymph's tree
Rhoeo	Ῥοιώ	a lover of Apollo

== S ==
Name	Ancient Greek	Description
Saon	Σάων	the name of several mythological figures
Saron	Σάρων	king of Troezen who drowned in the gulf
Sarpedon	Σαρπηδών	the name of several mythological figures
Scamandrius	Σκαμάνδριος	a Trojan warrior killed by Menelaus
Schedius	Σχεδίος	the name of several mythological figures
Schoeneus	Σχοινεύς	the name of several mythological figures
Scylaceus	Σκυλακεύς	A Lycian ally of the Trojans. Though wounded by Ajax the Lesser he survived and returned home after the Fall of Troy only to subsequently be stoned to death by several women of Lycia when he told them how their husbands and sons had all died in the war. At the urging of Apollo a monument to Scylaceus was built to make amends for this crime and he was subsequently worshipped as a minor god.
Scylla	Σκύλλα	the name of several mythological figures
Scylla	Σκύλλα	man-eating beast who devoured Odysseus' crewmates
Scylla	Σκύλλα	daughter of Nisus and princess of Megara
Selemnus	Σέλεμνος	a man who loved the sea nymph Argyra
Serapis	Σάραπις	Serapis was a Greco-Egyptian god who combined aspects of Egyptian and Hellenistic religions. He was a composite of the Egyptian gods Osiris and Apis, and the Greek god Zeus. Serapis was associated with many other gods, including Asklepios, Dionysos, and Hades.
Side	Σίδη	the name of several mythological figures
Side	Σίδη	daughter of Ictinus who killed herself
Side	Σίδη	the first wife of Orion
Sidero	Σιδηρώ	stepmother of Tyro
Sinoessa	Σινόεσσα	nurse of Poseidon, later renamed to Arne
Siproites	Σιπροίτης	Cretan hunter who saw Artemis naked
Smicrus	Σμίκρος	father of the seer Branchus
Smyrna	Σμύρνα	the name of several mythological figures
Socus	Σῶκος	the name of several mythological figures
Solois	Σολόεις	an Athenian man who fell in love with the Amazon Antiope
Solymus	Σολύμου	ancestral hero of the Solymi tribe in Lycia
Sopater	Σώπατρος	a man who killed an ox
Sostratus	Σώστρατος	a beloved of Heracles
Sparta	Σπάρτα	the wife of Lacedaemon for whom the city of Sparta was named
Staphylus	Στάφυλος	the name of several mythological figures
Staphylus	Στάφυλος	a son of Ariadne by either Dionysus or Theseus
Staphylus	Στάφυλος	a goatherd of king Oeneus who discovered grapes and their juice
Stentor	Στέντωρ	a herald of the Greek forces during the Trojan War
Stheneboea	Σθενέβοια	the daughter of Iobates and consort of Proteus
Sthenele	Σθενέλη	the name of several mythological figures
Sthenelus	Σθένελος	the name of several mythological figures
Stratonice	Στρατoνίκη	the name of several mythological figures
Strophius	Στρόφιος	the name of several mythological figures
Stymphalus	Στύμφαλος	the name of several mythological figures
Syleus	Συλεύς	a Lydian who forced people to dig his vineyard and was killed by Heracles
Syme	Σύμη	eponym of the island Syme
Sciron	Σκίρων	son of Poseidon, bandit

== T ==
Name	Ancient Greek	Description
Tecmessa	Τέκμησσα	the name of several mythological figures
Tecmessa	Τέκμησσα	mistress of Ajax
Tegeates	Τεγεάτης	founder of Tegea
Telecleia	Τηλέκλεια	a daughter of Ilus and wife of Cisseus
Telegonus	Τηλέγονος	son of Circe and Odysseus
Telemachus	Τηλέμαχος	Son of Odysseus and Penelope, and a central character in the Odyssey
Teleon	Τελέων	father of Butes and Eribotes
Telephassa	Τηλέφασσα	wife of Agenor and mother of Cadmus
Tenes	Τέννης	eponymous hero of Tenedos
Termerus	Τέρμερος	a bandit killed by Heracles
Teuthis	Τεῦθις	Achaean leader who left the Trojan War
Teuthras	Τεύθρας	a native of Magnesia, who fought at Troy and was killed by Hector and Ares
Teuthras	Τεύθρας	an Athenian, founder and eponym of Teuthrone in Laconia
Teuthras	Τεύθρας	Brother of Tyres and one of the companions of Aeneas
Teuthras	Τεύθρας	a young man of Argos, son of Iphiclus; he was shot to death by the Amazon Hippolyta during the Parthian War
Theano	Θεανώ	wife of Metapontus
Theiodamas	Θειοδάμας	the name of several mythological figures
Themiste	Θεμίστη	a daughter of Ilus and mother of Anchises
Themisto	Θεμιστώ	the name of several mythological figures
Theobule	Θεοβούλη	the name of several mythological figures
Theoclymenus	Θεοκλύμενος	a seer from Argos who accompanies Telemachus to Ithaca
Theoclymenus	Θεοκλύμενος	the name of several mythological figures
Theonoe	Θεονόη	the name of several mythological figures
Theophane	Θεοφάνη	a lover of Poseidon, changed into an ewe
Thero	Θηρώ	the name of several mythological figures
Thersander	Θέρσανδρος	the name of several mythological figures
Thersanon	Θέρσανων	a son of Helios and Leucothoe
Thersites	Θερσίτης	a soldier of the Greek army during the Trojan War
Thespius	Θέσπιος	founder-king of Thespiae Boeotia
Thestius	Θέστιος	the father of Iphicles
Thestor	Θέστωρ	the name of several mythological figures
Thisbe	Θίσβη	the tragic lover of Pyramus, on whom Shakespeare's Juliet is based
Thoas	Θόας	the name of several mythological figures
Thoon	Θόων	the name of several mythological figures
Thrace	Θράκη	the daughter of Oceanus and Parthenope, and sister of Europa
Thrassa	Θρᾷσσα	a daughter of Ares and Tereine, daughter of Strymon
Thrasymedes	Θρασυμήδης	soldier who fought on the side of the Greeks in the Trojan War
Thymoetes	Θυμοίτης	the name of several mythological figures
Timagoras	Τιμαγόρας	metic from Athens, in love with Meles
Timandra	Τιμάνδρα	the daughter of Leda and Tyndareus
Timandra	Τιμάνδρα	the mother of Neophron
Tisiphone	Τισιφόνη	daughter of Alcmaeon and Manto
Titanis	Τιτανίς	a girl in Artemis' retinue kicked out for being too beautiful
Tithonus	Τιθωνός	a lover of Eos, granted immortality but not eternal youth
Tlepolemus	Τληπόλεμος	a son of Heracles who fought in the Trojan War of the side of the Greeks
Tmolus	Τμῶλος	the name of several mythological figures
Tmolus	Τμῶλος	a king of Lydia in love with the nymph Arrhippe
Toxeus	Τοξεύς	the name of several mythological figures
Trambelus	Τράμβηλος	a son of Telamon and half-brother of Ajax
Trochilus	Τρόχιλος	possible inventor of the chariot linked to cults of Hera and Demeter
Troezen	Τροιζήν	a son of Pelops and eponym of the city Troezen
Trophonius	Τροφώνιος	an architect, brother of Agamedes
Tydeus	Τυδεύς	father of Diomedes and one of the Seven Against Thebes
Tyres	Τύρης	a companion of Aeneas along with his brother Teuthras
Tyres	Τύρης	a warrior in the army of Perses who fought and died in the war between Perses and Aeetes
Tyro	Τυρώ	daughter of Salmoneus
Tyros	Τύρος	a Tyrian nymph

== U ==
Name	Ancient Greek	Description
Ucalegon	Οὐκαλέγων	an elder of Troy
Udaeus	Οὐδαῖος	one of the five remaining Spartoi
Upis	Οὖπις	one of Artemis' maiden attendants

== X ==
Name	Ancient Greek	Description
Xanthippe	Ξανθίππη	the name of several mythological figures
Xanthius	Ξάνθιος	a descendant of Bellerophon and father of Leucippus
Xanthus	Ξάνθος	the name of several mythological figures
Xuthus	Ξοῦθος	a son of Hellen and Orseis and father of Ion and Achaeus

== Z ==
Name	Ancient Greek	Description
Zarex	Ζάρηξ	a son of Carystus and founder of the town Zarex in Laconia
Zariadres	Ζαριάδρης	Caucasian king who fell in love with Odatis in his dream
Zetes	Ζήτης	an Argonaut and son of Boreas
Zethus	Ζήθος	son of Zeus, twin of Amphion
Zeuxippe	Ζευξίππη	the name of several mythological figures
Zeuxippus	Ζεύξιππος	the name of several mythological figures

== A group of figures ==
- Children of Priam
- Homeric
- Neleides
- Sons of Aegyptus
- Suitors of Helen
- Theban kings / Queens

== See also ==
- Greek mythology
- Ancient Greek religion
- Classical mythology
- List of Greek deities
- List of mortals in Greek mythology
- List of Greek mythological creatures
