= Side (mythology) =

Several figures in Greek mythology

In Greek mythology, Side (Ancient Greek: Σίδη, romanized: Sídē, lit. 'pomegranate') or Sida (Ancient Greek: Σίδα, romanized: Sída) was the name of the following figures:

- Sida, eponym of the city of Sidon in Phoenicia. She was the wife of Belus, king of Egypt and mother of Aegyptus and Danaus. Otherwise, the wife of Belus was called Achiroe, daughter of the river-god Nilus.
- Side, one of the Danaïdes, condemned to Tartarus for murdering her husband. From her, a town in Laconia was believed to derived its name from.
- Side, the first wife of Orion and possible mother of his daughters Menippe and Metioche. She was cast by Hera into Hades because she rivaled the goddess in beauty.
- Side, a mortal woman who was chased down by her father Ictinus, intending to rape her. Side killed herself on her mother's grave, and the gods turned her blood into a pomegranate tree. Her father was changed into a kite bird that never rested on pomegranate trees.
- Side, the daughter of Taurus and wife of Cimolus, who gave her name to the Pamphylian city Side.
