= Comaetho (lover of Cydnus) =

Queen in Greek mythology

In Greek mythology, Comaetho (Ancient Greek: Κομαιθώ, romanized: Komaithṓ, lit. 'bright-haired') is a queen or Naiad nymph of Cilicia who fell in love with the local river-god Cydnus. The goddess Aphrodite then transformed her into a spring, and the queen was acquatically joined with her beloved for the rest of time.

== Family ==
The fifth-century poet Nonnus describes Comaetho as a daughter of Cydnus, though elsewhere he simply describes her as his lover. Like Cydnus, now known as the Berdan River, Comaetho was from Cilicia, a region located in southern Asia Minor. Comaetho is both described as a mortal woman and a Naiad nymph.

== Mythology ==
The maid Comaetho ruled over the Cilicians. As she approached marriage age, the girl fell in love with the river-god Cydnus and pined for him until the goddess Aphrodite turned her into a spring, presumably in order to unite the two. Thereafter Comaetho was glad to join him in wedlock and mingle her newly-formed waters with those of Cydnus.

== Background ==
The earliest attestation of this story comes from a fragment of Parthenius, preserved by Eustathius of Thessalonica who is in turn quoted by Stephanus of Byzantium; in this case the story would be the earliest example of a full metamorphosis into a body of sweet water.

The myth might have arisen as a geographical, aetiological narrative in order to describe a spring near Glaphyrae, a town in Cilicia, and thus could be traced back to Parthenius's own Metamorphoses work. Some doubts have been cast over this assertment, as it is most likely that that work was written in hexameters.

The story of Comaetho has been compared to that of the river-god Alpheus and the nymph Arethusa, owing to their shared theme of contrast of the water and the fire of love. It also bears similarities with another fragmentary text by Parthenius regarding the story of Byblis; both myths feature maidens suffering from their incestuous passions, if Cydnus is taken to be Comaetho's father.

== See also ==
Other maidens and their fathers linked incestuously:

- Side and Ictinus.
- Myrrha and Cinyras/Theias.
- Gorge and Oeneus.

== Bibliography ==
- Forbes Irving, Paul M. C. (1990). Metamorphosis in Greek Myths. Clarendon Press. ISBN 0-19-814730-9.
- Graves, Robert (1955). The Greek Myths. Vol. I (3rd 1960 ed.). London: Penguin. ISBN 978-0140010268.
- Grimal, Pierre (1987). The Dictionary of Classical Mythology. Wiley-Blackwell. ISBN 0-631-13209-0.
- Klooster, Jacqueline J.H. (2012). ""εις έπη και ελεγείας ανάγειν": the Erotika Pathemata of Parthenius of Nicaea" (PDF). In Baumbach, M.; Bär, S. (eds.). Brill's companion to Greek and Latin epyllion and its reception. Brill's companions in classical studies. Leiden: Brill Publications. ISBN 9789004214323.
- Nonnus, Dionysiaca; translated by Rouse, W H D, I Books I-XV. Loeb Classical Library No. 344, Cambridge, Massachusetts, Harvard University Press; London, William Heinemann Ltd. 1940. Internet Archive
- Nonnus, Dionysiaca; translated by Rouse, W H D, III Books XXXVI-XLVIII. Loeb Classical Library No. 346, Cambridge, Massachusetts, Harvard University Press; London, William Heinemann Ltd. 1940. Internet Archive.
- Parthenius of Nicaea in Hellenistic Collection: Philitas. Alexander of Aetolia. Hermesianax. Euphorion. Parthenius. Edited and translated by J. L. Lightfoot. Loeb Classical Library 508. Cambridge, MA: Harvard University Press, 2010.
