= Echemeia =

Greek mythological nymph

In Greek mythology, Echemeia (Note: In the corrupted text, it is actually spelled Ethemeia, which does not follow Greek grammatical rules.) (Ancient Greek: Ἐχέμεια, romanized: Ekhemeia, lit. 'holding back' or 'having a habit/ disposition') is a minor character who angered the goddess Artemis.

== Mythology ==
Her only tale survives in the works of a Roman mythographer named Hyginus. According to him, Echemeia was a Coan nymph who ceased to honour Artemis, so the goddess shot her in punishment. The queen of the dead, Persephone, who witnessed that, snatched Echemeia alive and brought her to the Underworld. Echemeia's husband Merops mourned her loss so much Hera took pity in him and changed him into an eagle, and then transferred him to the stars as the constellation Aquila. There is no more to this story, but it is possible that Echemeia had originally been part of the retinue of Artemis and broke her vows when she married Merops, hence her punishment; her story bears resemblance to those of Taygete and Maera, wife of Tegeates.

== See also ==
- Callisto
- Titanis
- Rhodopis and Euthynicus

== Bibliography ==
- Fontenrose, Joseph Eddy (1981). Orion: The Myth of the Hunter and the Huntress. University of California Press. ISBN 0-520-09632-0.
- Hyginus, Gaius Julius, Astronomica from The Myths of Hyginus translated and edited by Mary Grant. University of Kansas Publications in Humanistic Studies. Online version at the Topos Text Project.
- Smith, William, A Dictionary of Greek and Roman Biography and Mythology, London, John Murray: printed by Spottiswoode and Co., New-Street Square and Parliament Street, 1873.
