= Titanis (mythology) =

Greek mythological deer

In Greek mythology, Titanis (Ancient Greek: Τιτανίς, romanized: Titanis, lit. 'she-Titan') is an obscure figure who is connected to Artemis, the goddess of the hunt. Her existence and myth is only attested in Euripides, an Athenian playwright of the fifth century BC. Titanis' story seems to be an amalgamation of the myths of Callisto and Taygete, two virgins connected to Artemis and notable for their animal metamorphoses.

== Family ==
The only thing known about her family is a father named Merops. That Merops might have been identical with Merops the king of Kos, an island in the southeastern Aegean Sea.

== Mythology ==
Titanis' tale is a very brief and obscure one, surviving in just one line in Euripides' 412 BC play Helen. According to Euripides, the beautiful Titanis was changed by Artemis into a golden-antlered deer and expelled from her group on account of her beauty:

ἅν τέ ποτ' Ἄρτεμις ἐξεχορεύσατο χρυσοκέρατ' ἔλαφον Μέροπος Τιτανίδα κούραν καλλοσύνας ἕνεκεν.

— Euripides, Helen 332
Translation:

[A]nd also the one whom Artemis once drove from her chorus, as a deer with horns of gold, the Titan girl, daughter of Merops, because of her loveliness.

— Trans. by E. P. Coleridge, Ed.

== Background ==
The brief passage containing Titanis' myth is very ambiguous due to its short length, as it is not entirely clear what Euripides meant when he wrote that Artemis kicked her out 'on account of her beauty'; it could be that Titanis bragged about being more beautiful than the goddess, or that her beauty attracted the attention of Zeus, or that Artemis got jealous of her.

The story seems like an echo of the myth of the Arcadian princess Callisto, whom Artemis punished for being seduced or raped by Zeus, and might be a deliberate distortion or imitation of that story on Euripides' part. The similarity to another myth, that of Artemis turning the nymph Taygete into a doe in order to help her escape from the advances of Zeus, has also been noted. Pindar, one of the earliest sources of Taygete's myth, wrote that she dedicated a deer to Artemis in gratitude for saving her, and Euripides' Titanis might be a twist on that story.

Titanis's own nature is questionable, as Euripides names her father as Merops, but given that her name translates to "female Titan", he could be designating her as a Titaness without naming her. In the Orphic Hymns, 'Titanis' (there spelled as Τιτηνίς, Titēnís) appears as an epithet of Artemis herself, while the masculine version, 'Titan', is also an epithet of Apollo.

== See also ==
Punitive transformations in Greek mythology:

- Antigone
- Themisto
- Gerana
- Rhodope

== Bibliography ==
- Athanassakis, Apostolos N.; Wolkow, Benjamin M. (July 31, 2013). The Orphic Hymns. Baltimore, Maryland: Johns Hopkins University Press. ISBN 978-1-4214-0881-1.
- Euripides (1938). The Complete Greek Drama, edited by Whitney J. Oates and Eugene O'Neill, Jr. Vol. 11: Helen. Translated by E. P. Coleridge. New York: Random House.
- Fontenrose, Joseph Eddy (1981). Orion: The Myth of the Hunter and the Huntress. University of California Press. ISBN 0-520-09632-0.
- Forbes Irving, Paul M. C. (1990). Metamorphosis in Greek Myths. Clarendon Press. ISBN 0-19-814730-9.
- Hathorn, Richmond Y. (1967). Crowell's Handbook to Classical Drama. NYC, United States: Thomas Y. Crowell Company. ISBN 0-690-22501-6.
