= Rhodope (queen) =

Thracian queen in Greek mythology

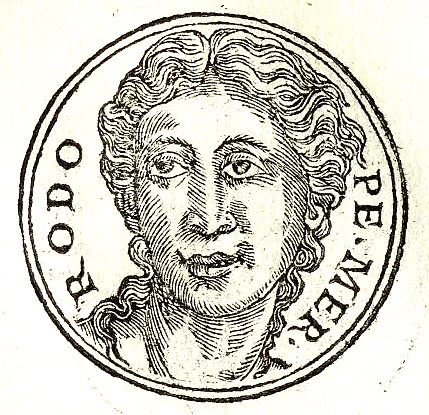
Queen Rhodope from Guillaume Rouillé's Promptuarii Iconum Insigniorum.

In ancient Greek and Roman mythology, Rhodope (Ancient Greek: Ῥοδόπη, romanized: Rhodópē) is the wife of Haemus and queen of Thrace. She and her husband were punished together by being transformed into mountain ranges after daring to compare themselves to Zeus and Hera, the highest gods. The Rhodope Mountains, nowadays shared between Bulgaria and Greece, were named after this queen.

== Family ==
Rhodope's parentage is not clear in ancient texts; a scholiast makes a Thracian Rhodope the daughter of the river-god Strymon, but it is not clear whether this is supposed to be the same Rhodope. In the Homeric Hymn to Demeter, a Rhodope is the daughter of the Titans Oceanus and Tethys and playmate to Persephone before her abduction.

Rhodope married Haemus (son of the Boreas and Orithyia), and together they had a son named Hebrus, the namesake of the Hebrus river (now more commonly known as the Maritsa) which now forms one of the northern borders of Greece, the boundary between West and East Thrace.

== Mythology ==
Rhodope married Haemus, king of Thrace, and became queen. She and Haemus had a good marriage that led to them becoming arrogant and insolent against the gods. Eventually they started referring to themselves as Zeus and Hera, the names of the highest of the gods. As punishment the gods turned them both into icy peaks; Haemus became the Haemus Mons (the modern Balkan Mountains, after which the peninsula is named), while Rhodope became the Rhodopes.

Thracian Mount Rhodope and Mount Haemus, now icy peaks, once mortal beings who ascribed the names of the highest gods to themselves.

— Ovid, Metamorphoses 6.87 ff (trans. A. S. Kline)

In a parodic or paradoxographic pseudo-Plutarchic text, now known not to have been authored by Plutarch, Rhodope and Haemus were in addition brother and sister, and it was the incest along with their hubris that caused Hera and Zeus to punish them. A scholiast made the pair father and daughter. Some time later, the goddess Athena wove Rhodope's fate into her tapestry during her weaving contest with the Lydian maiden Arachne as a warning against those who dared to challenge the gods.

== In culture ==
Haemus and Rhodope's myth belong to a subcategory of stone myths were the petrification serves as punishment against lust, or a sad contrast between unfeeling, inanimate stones and human love, also seen seen in the myth of Lethaea and Olenus.

== See also ==
Other people who were punished for insulting the gods:

- Gerana
- Alcyone and Ceyx
- Antigone of Troy
- Lethaea
- Side

== Bibliography ==
- Anonymous, Scholia in Theocritus, Bion and Moschus volume II, edited by T. Kiessling, including scholia and indices. London: Richard Priestley. 1826. Google books.
- Avery, Catherine B., ed. (1962). New Century Classical Handbook. New York, US: Appleton-Century-Crofts.
- Bell, Robert E. (1991). Women of Classical Mythology: A Biographical Dictionary. ABC-Clio. ISBN 9780874365818.
- Forbes Irving, Paul M. C. (1990). Metamorphosis in Greek Myths. Clarendon Press. ISBN 0-19-814730-9.
- Grimal, Pierre (1987). The Dictionary of Classical Mythology. Wiley-Blackwell. ISBN 0-631-13209-0.
- Kiessling, T.; Heindorfius, L. F. Τ, eds. (1826). Theocritus, Bion et Moschus. Vol. II. London, United Kingdom.
- Larson, Jennifer (June 28, 2001). Greek Nymphs: Myth, Cult, Lore. Oxford, New York: Oxford University Press. ISBN 0-19-512294-1.
- Ovid, Metamorphoses, with an English prose translation by A. S. Kline, 2000. Text available online at Poetry in Translation.
- Pseudo-Plutarch, De fluviis in Plutarch's Morals. Translated from the Greek by several hands. Corrected and revised by. William W. Goodwin, PH. D. Boston. Little, Brown, and Company. Cambridge. Press Of John Wilson and son. 1874. 5. Available in Perseus Digital Library.
- The Homeric Hymns and Homerica with an English Translation by Hugh G. Evelyn-White. Homeric Hymns. Cambridge, MA., Harvard University Press; London, William Heinemann Ltd. 1914. Available online at Perseus.tufts Digital Library.
- Tripp, Edward (June 1970). Crowell's Handbook of Classical Mythology (1st ed.). Thomas Y. Crowell Co. ISBN 069022608X.
