= Haemus =

Son of Boreas, in Greek mythology

In Greek mythology, King Haemus (/ˈhiːməs/; Ancient Greek: Αἷμος, romanized: Haîmos, lit. 'mountain ridge') of Thrace, was the son of Boreas, the north wind, and Princess Orithyia of Athens. By Rhodope, he became the father of Hebrus, eponym of river Hebrus.

== Mythology ==
Haemus was vain and haughty and compared himself and his wife, Queen Rhodope, to Zeus and Hera. The gods changed him and his wife into mountains (respectively Haemus Mons, now known as the Balkan Mountains, and the Rhodope Mountains). In ancient Greek, the Balkan Peninsula was thus known as the "Peninsula of Haemus" (Χερσόνησος τοῦ Αἵμου), a name which retains some currency in modern Greek.

Another classic etymology derives the name 'Haemos' from the myth about the fight of Zeus and the dragon Typhon:

He was again driven to Thrace and hurled entire mountains at Zeus in the battle around Mount Haemus. When these bounced back upon him under the force of the thunderbolt, blood gushed out on the mountain. From this, they say, the mountain is called haemus ("bloody").
