= Propoetides =

Greek mythical characters

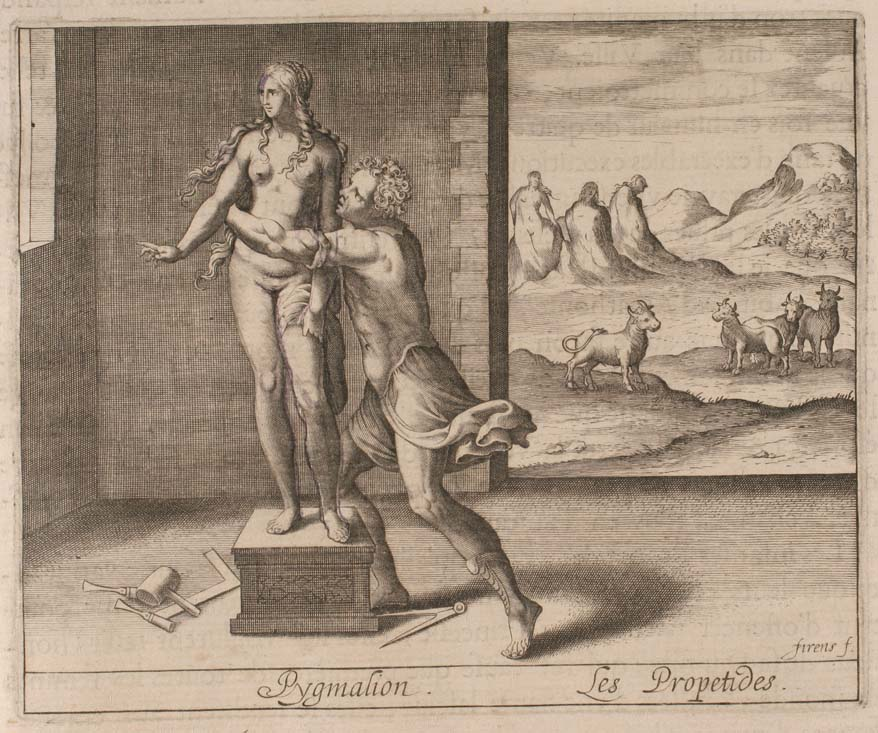
Engraving from 1651 with Pygmalion in the foreground and the Propoetides in the background

In Greco-Roman mythology, the Propoetides (Ancient Greek: Προποιτίδες, romanized: Propoitídes) are the daughters of Propoetus from the city of Amathus on the island of Cyprus. They refused to worship the goddess of love, Venus/Aphrodite, who then punished them accordingly, which led to a divine curse, and ultimately being petrified into stone. Their short tale appears only in the Metamorphoses, a narrative poem by Ovid.

== Mythology ==
In Roman literature, they are treated by Ovid in his Metamorphoses. According to Ovid, the immoral Propoetides denied that Venus (Greek Aphrodite) was a goddess, and refused to worship her. In divine anger, the goddess made them prostitute their bodies. The women lost their public reputation, their sense of shame, and even the ability to feel love or emotions. The goddess then hardened the blood in their cheeks so that they could no longer blush, and finally turned them all into hard flints.

According to Ovid, after seeing the Propoetides prostituting themselves, Pygmalion determined that he was "not interested in women". This drove him to create a woman of his own in statue form, with whom he then fell in love.

== In culture ==
The story of Venus and her vengeance on the Propoetides for failing to worship her properly is a common theme in a number of stories and poems written about the goddess.

According to Herodotus, ancient tradition in Cyprus "compels every woman of the land to sit in the temple of Aphrodite and have intercourse with some stranger at least once in her life." Cyprus was famous for this forced sacred prostitution in the ancient world; this fame informed Ovid's tale of the Propoetides. Historian Stephanie Budin contends that this type of prostitution was a myth, and did not actually occur in Cyprus or anywhere else in the Near East and Mediterranean.

== See also ==
- Gerana
- Byssa
- Pentheus
- Lycian peasants
