= Androcleia and Alcis =

Greek mythological women

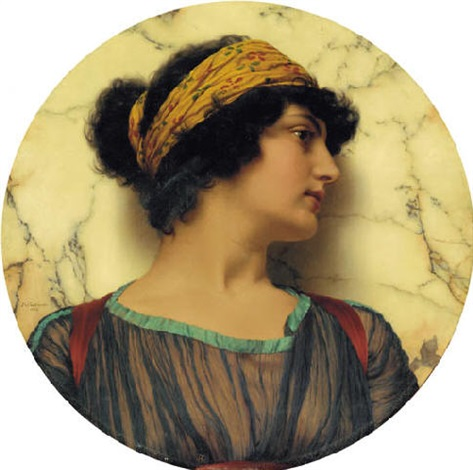
1915 imagining of Androcleia of by John William Godward

Androcleia and Alcis (or Androclēa and Alcida) are mythical sisters and ancient Greek heroes. They are said to have sacrificed their lives for their city, Thebes, and were honoured by being buried in a prominent temple.

Greek geographer Pausanias recorded that Heracles and the Thebans were preparing to go to battle against the neighbouring city of Orchomenus when an oracle revealed that victory would be assured for Thebes if its "citizen of the most noble descent would consent to die by his own hand." Since Theban nobleman Antipoenus, who was descended from Spartoi, was "loath to die for the people", his two daughters, Androcleia and Alcis, took their own lives instead, and were celebrated for their act of courage and generosity. Their bodies were entombed in the nearby temple of the goddess Artemis Eucleia, where Heracles also dedicated an image of a lion to their memory.

According to classicist Dennis D. Hughes, the sacrifice of young women (voluntarily or otherwise) to protect cities, typically prompted by an oracle, is a recurring theme in Greek myth. He compares Androcleia and Alcis to Menippe and Metioche, daughters of Orion, who similarly gave their lives to save Orchomenus from a plague. Eliza Rosenberg suggested that, like other sacrificed women, Androcleia and Alcis might have become the subject of a "heroine cult", where a bride might offer a lock of hair or lamentations at the sisters' tomb before her wedding.
