= Phaon =

Greek mythological figure

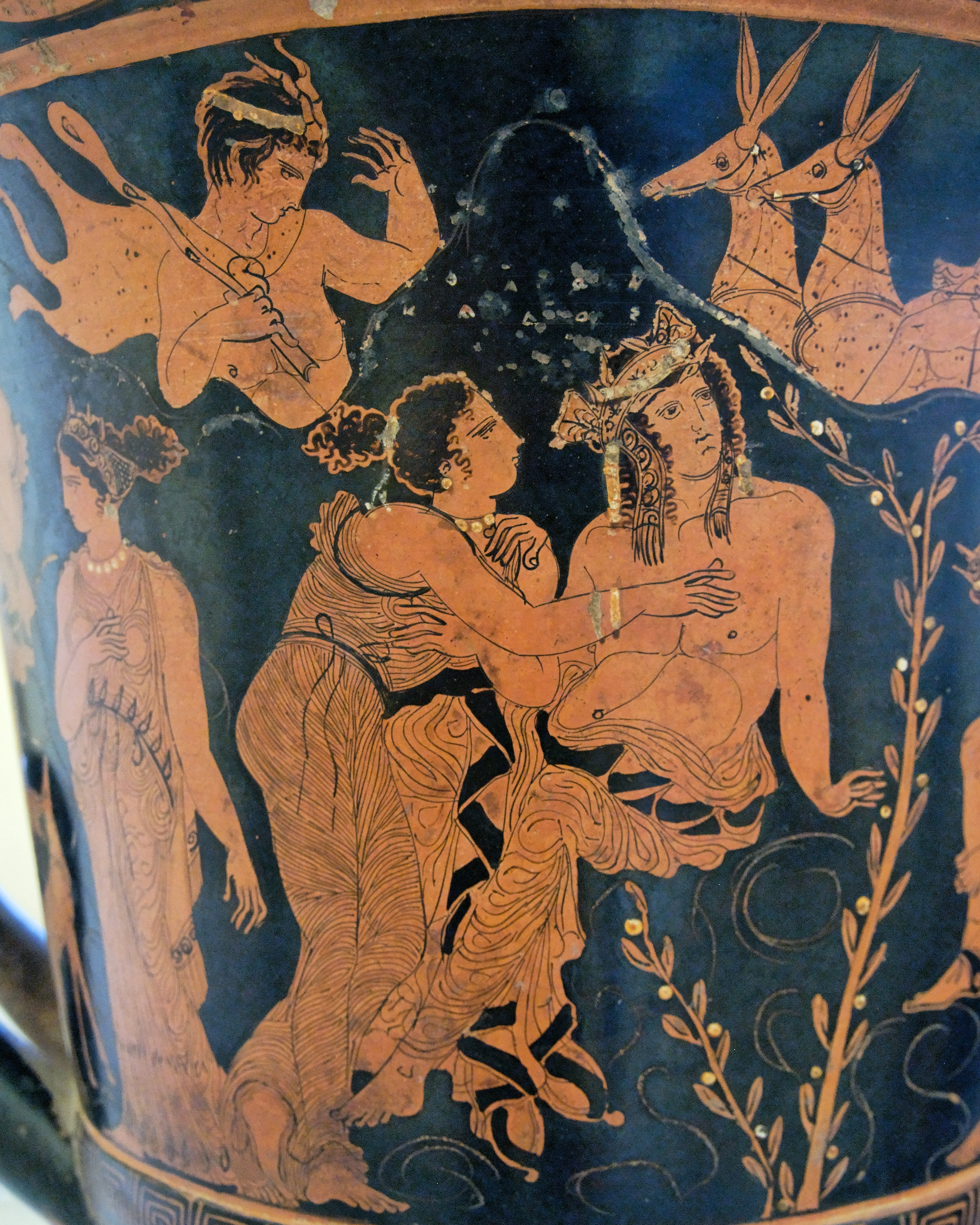
Phaon and Aphrodite with Eros, 420–400s BC Attic red-figure calyx krater in the Antonino Salinas Regional Archaeological Museum, Italy.

In Greek mythology, Phaon (Ancient Greek: Φάων, romanized: Pháōn, lit. 'radiant') is an old and ugly boatman from the island of Lesbos who was given youth and beauty by the goddess Aphrodite when he ferried her with his boat without payment. Some legends associated him with the Archaic poetess Sappho as her unrequited love that she killed herself over. Phaon appeared in Attic comedies of the fifth century BC which are now lost.

== Mythology ==
Phaon was an aged and homely ferryman from Lesbos who was nonetheless admired by the Lesbians for his sound character; although he made his livelihood ferrying people to and from the Anatolian mainland, he charged fairly and did not take money from those who could not afford the trip. One day the goddess Aphrodite came to him, disguised as an old crone. Phaon treated her courteously with care and did not ask for payment to transport her. Aphrodite rewarded him by gifting Phaon an alabaster box full of ointment; when Phaon applied the substance on himself, he became young and beautiful, causing many Mytilenaeans to fall in love with him.

Lucian placed the incident in Chios, another eastern Aegean island. Phaon was also credited with the establishment of Aphrodite's temple in Leucas and the Leucadian rock; he attracted many women, and one of them fell off this rock when she could not have him. Aelian wrote that he was killed on account of adultery.

== Sappho ==
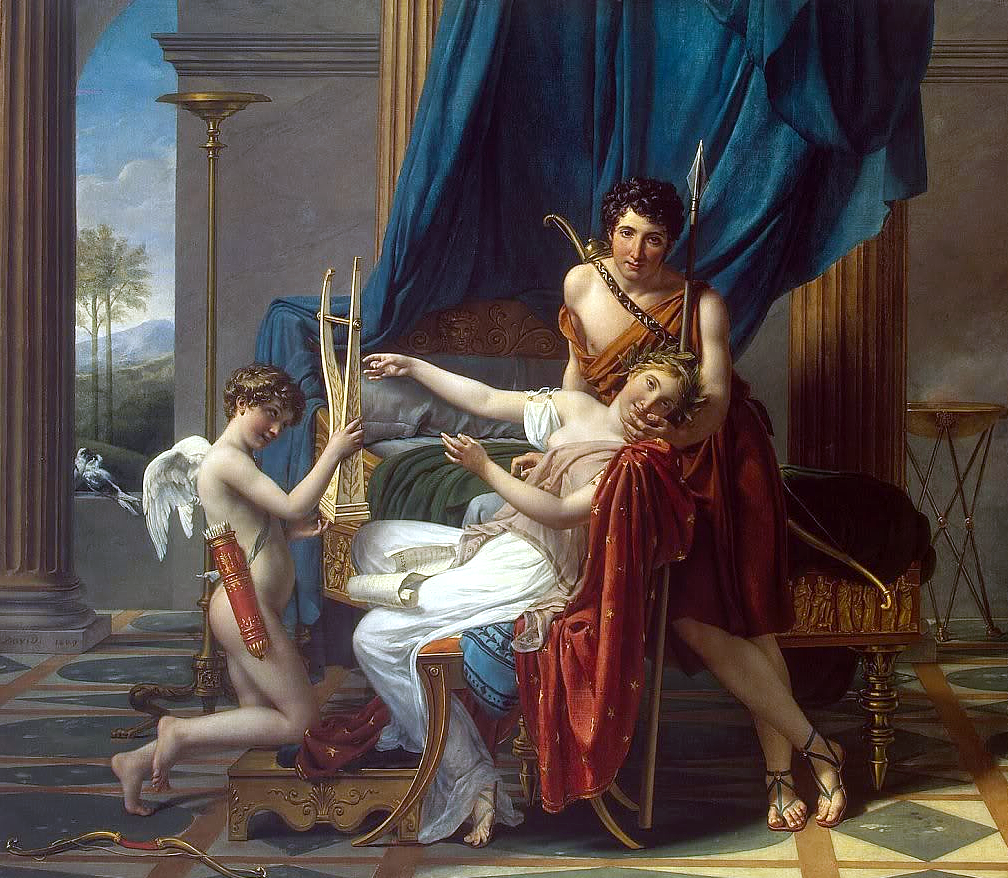
Sappho, Phaon, and Cupid. Jacques-Louis David, 1809

Another famous story related about Phaon is the ill-fated love Sappho bore for him, and his rejection of her that eventually drove Sappho to throw herself from the Leucadian Rock and die according to the legend, a story rather contrary to Sappho's connection with homosexuality. The myth with Phaon might be apocryphal, a mix-up with a different ancient woman called Sappho, or a misinterpretation of Sappho's words by later authors. An entry of the Suda claims that it was a different woman named Sappho that loved Phaon and killed herself in the Leucadian rock, and because of that 'Phaon' came to be used for those who were desirable but arrogant.

Ovid dramatised the love of Sappho and Phaon in his Heroides epistles. Plautus mentions him in his play Miles Gloriosus as being one of only two men in the whole world who had the luck to be "so passionately loved by a woman".

== Analysis ==
Sources containing the myth with Aphrodite—such as Lucian and Aelian—are late, while earlier works about him are Attic comedies, where is presented as young and desirable; in Plato he is besieged by love-struck women. According to the comedian Cratinus (c. 519–422 BC), Aphrodite herself fell in love with Phaon and hid him in a bed of lettuces so that she could keep him for herself, while Marsyas of Philippi claimed it was unripe barley.

== See also ==
Other Greek myths of transformation:

- Achilles
- Medusa
- Baucis and Philemon

== Bibliography ==
- Aelian, Various Histories, translated into English by Thomas Stanley, edition of 1665, digitized by the University of Chicago. Available online at Topos Text.
- Castle, Terry (2002). Boss Ladies, Watch Out!: Essays on Women, Sex and Writing. London: Routledge. ISBN 0-415-93873-2.
- Käppel, Lutz (October 1, 2006). "Phaon". In Cancik, Hubert; Schneider, Helmuth (eds.). Brill's New Pauly. Translated by Christine F. Salazar. Kiel: Brill Reference Online. ISSN 1574-9347.
- Lucian, Dialogues of the Dead. Dialogues of the Sea Gods. Dialogues of the Gods. Dialogues of the Courtesans with an English translation by M. D. MacLeod. Loeb Classical Library 431. Cambridge, MA: Harvard University Press, 1961. Available online at Loeb Classical Library.
- Olson, Douglas; Seaberg, Ryan (2018). FrC 3.6 Kratinos. Vandenhoeck & Ruprecht. ISBN 9783946317272.
- Palaephatus, On Things not to be Believed, translated into English by John Brady Kiesling from the Greek text of N. Festa (Teubner 1902). A readable but not literal translation by Jacob Stern came out in 1996. Available online on Topos Text.
- Schmitz, Leonhard (1867). Smith, William (ed.). A Dictionary of Greek and Roman Biography and Mythology. London, UK: John Murray, printed by Spottiswoode and Co. Online version at the Perseus.tufts library.
- Servius, In Vergilii carmina comentarii. Servii Grammatici qui feruntur in Vergilii carmina commentarii; recensuerunt Georgius Thilo et Hermannus Hagen. Georgius Thilo. Leipzig. B. G. Teubner. 1881. Online version at the Perseus Digital Library.
