= Meliboea =

In Greek mythology, Meliboea /ˌmɛlɪˈbiːə/ or Meliboia (Ancient Greek: Μελίβοια) was a name attributed to the following individuals:

- Meliboea, daughter of the Titan Oceanus possibly by his sister-wife Tethys. She was the Oceanid who became the mother of King Lycaon of Arcadia with Pelasgus. She was also loved by the river god Orontes, who stopped his waters out of love for her, flooding the land.
- Meliboea, mother of Alector by Magnes, who named the town of Meliboea in Thessaly after her. The town of Meliboea became a kingdom in eastern Thessalia (north Magnesia). Nowadays, Meliboea (Melivoia) is a municipality of Larissa regional unit. The exact place of ancient Meliboia is not known.
- Meliboea, alias Chloris of Thebes, the only Niobid spared when Artemis and Apollo killed the rest. She was so horrified at the sight of her siblings' deaths that she stayed greenishly pale for the rest of her life, and for that reason she was dubbed Chloris ("the pale one").
- Meliboea, a maiden of Ephesus. She loved a young man named Alexis, but her parents betrothed her to another man, and Alexis had to leave the city. By divine intervention she was carried to the place where Alexis lived. The reunited lovers dedicated two temples to Aphrodite.
- Meliboea, mother of Phellus, according to Hesiod. Both mother and son are otherwise unknown.
- Meliboea is also an alternate name for Periboea or Eriboea, mother of Ajax the Great, who was also said to have been married to Theseus.

== Kings of Meliboea ==
Famous kings of Meliboea were:

- King Poeas (Argonaut), a friend of Hercules.
- King Philoctetes, son of Poeas, was a famous archer, and a participant in the Trojan War.
