= Antigone (daughter of Laomedon) =

Daughter of Laomedon in Greek mythology

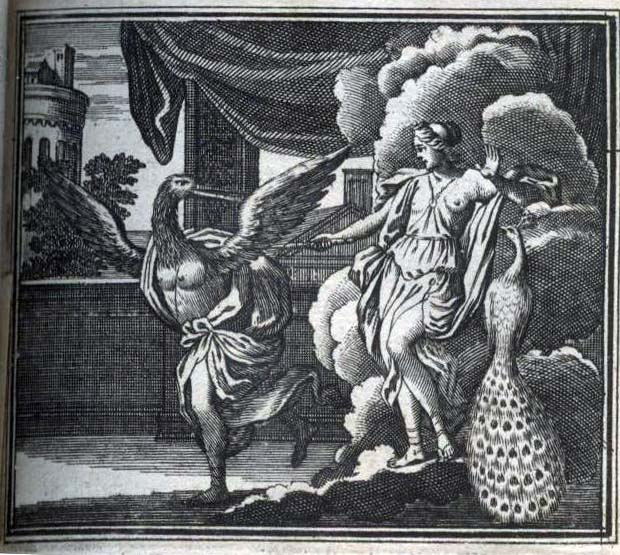
Juno turns Antigone into a stork, engraving-llustration for Ovid's Metamorphoses by Charles Le Brun, ca. 1676.

Antigone (/ænˈtɪɡəni/ ann-TIG-ə-nee; Ancient Greek: Ἀντιγόνη, romanized: Antigónē) is a minor figure in ancient Greek and Roman mythology. She is a Trojan princess, the daughter of king Laomedon and the sister of Priam. Antigone features in a little-known myth in which she incurs the wrath of the goddess Hera by comparing herself to her, and then suffers the consequences via metamorphosis.

Antigone's story is only known through Latin authors, most notable among them Ovid who included her myth in the Metamorphoses, and scholiasts. It might have originated from works of previous Greek writers such as Boios who wrote an extensive but lost work on mythical avian transformations.

== Etymology ==
Antigone's name is derived from the ancient Greek words ἀντι-, meaning "opposite" or "in place of" and γένος, which translates to "birth", "descent" or even "generation". Antigone's name thus could mean "in place of a mother".

== Family ==
Antigone was the daughter of King Laomedon of Troy by an unnamed mother. She was thus (half-)sister to Priam, Lampus, Clytius, Hicetaon, Bucolion, Tithonus, Hesione, Cilla, Astyoche, Aethilla, Medesicaste and Proclia.

== Mythology ==
The common theme across all versions of the story is that the Trojan princess Antigone caused Hera's wrath, who then transformed her into a stork.

The earliest mention of Antigone and her myth comes from Ovid's Metamorphoses around the first century. During her competition with the Lydian seamstress Arachne, Athena wove a tapestry with scenes of gods punishing blasphemous people who were guilty of hubris, or excessive pride against the gods. Athena included the story of the Trojan princess Antigone, daughter of king Laomedon, who was transformed into a white stork by Hera for trying to compete with her.

In a later account of Antigone's tale, preserved in the writings of the Vatican Mythographers, the arrogant Antigone saw herself as better and prettier than Hera, the queen of the gods. Hera then changed Antigone into a stork, or alternatively Hera turned Antigone's lovely hair into snakes as punishment; while she was bathing some time later, the gods took pity in her and thus changed her into a stork, thenceforth an enemy to snakes who preyed upon them, but she remained ever hostile to Zeus, the husband of Hera.

The Thebaid scholiast Lactantius Placidus wrote that Hera transformed Antigone into a stork for having slept with Zeus.

== Background ==
Antigone's story is known only in Latin authors, Ovid chiefly among them, and several scholiasts. It follows the themes of Boios' crane myth, where a beautiful woman compares herself to Hera and is transformed into a bird (cranes and storks were often classified together). Antigone's snake hair is modelled after the myths of Medusa and Scylla.

== See also ==
Other women who angered goddesses and were punished include:

- Myrmex
- Propoetides
- Corone
- Chione
- Side
