= Meliboea of Ephesus =

Woman in Greek mythology

In Greek and Roman mythology, Meliboea (/ˌmɛlɪˈbiːə/; Ancient Greek: Μελίβοια, romanized: Melíboia, lit. 'honey cattle') is a young woman from Ephesus who wished to marry her lover Alexis against her parents' wishes. The couple was only able to be united through divine intervention. Alexis and Meliboea's story is recorded in the works of Servius, a Latin grammarian of the fifth century. The myth is an aetiological story explaining the reason behind the goddess Aphrodite as worshipped under the epithets Automate and Epidaetia in Ephesus.

== Mythology ==
The young Meliboea lived with her parents in the city of Ephesus, an ancient Greek colony on the western coast of Asia Minor. She had fallen in love with a boy her own age, called Alexis, and both had given an oath to marry each other when time was ripe. But Meliboea's parents decided to betroth her to someone else of their own choosing instead, and they would not change their minds. Heartbroken over the news, Alexis decided to embark on a self-imposed exile and leave from Ephesus forever, while Meliboea stayed behind.

On the day the maiden was to be married to her betrothed, she decided to take her life and jumped off the roof of her house, but this failed and she landed on the ground uninjured. Instead she decided to flee, and arriving at the seashore she boarded a boat she found there. Immediately the ropes untied themselves on their own accord. By the will of the gods the boat brought Meliboea to the land where Alexis was living, while he was holding a feast for friends, and the two lovers were finally reunited and allowed to marry. The happy couple then erected a temple in honour of the love-goddess Aphrodite Automate ("the spontaneous", or "the one acting on her own will", after the ropes that allowed them to be together) and Epidaetia ("she of the feast", because Meliboea had arrived during a feast).

== See also ==
- Rhodopis and Euthynicus
- Clytie

== Bibliography ==
- Avery, Catherine B., ed. (1962). New Century Classical Handbook. New York, US: Appleton-Century-Crofts.
- Bell, Robert E. (1991). Women of Classical Mythology: A Biographical Dictionary. ABC-Clio. ISBN 9780874365818.
- Edmonds, John M. (1959). The Fragments of Attic Comedy After Meineke, Bergk, and Kock. Vol. II: Middle Comedy. BRILL. ISBN 978-90-04-60411-7.
- Maurus Servius Honoratus. In Vergilii carmina comentarii. Servii Grammatici qui feruntur in Vergilii carmina commentarii; recensuerunt Georgius Thilo et Hermannus Hagen. Georgius Thilo. Leipzig. B. G. Teubner. 1881. Online version at the Perseus Digital Library.
- Smith, William (1873). A Dictionary of Greek and Roman Biography and Mythology. London, UK: John Murray, printed by Spottiswoode and Co. Online version at the Perseus.tufts library.
