= Promedon =

Promedon (Ancient Greek: Προμέδων) is a name referring to the following characters in Greek myth or legend:

- Promedon, an otherwise unknown figure mentioned in Pausanias' description of Polygnotus' paintings at Lesche in Delphi. Promedon is said to have been depicted leaning against a willow in what seems to be a sacred grove of Persephone, next to such figures as Patroclus and Orpheus. The ancient sources Pausanias claims to have consulted had no uniform opinion concerning Promedon: from some it appeared he was a mere creation of Polygnotus, while others reportedly mentioned him as a music lover who especially favored the singing of Orpheus; thus he could have been believed to be a follower of Orpheus.
- Promedon of Naxos, a man seduced by his best friend's wife Neaera.
