= Ancaeus =

The name Ancaeus (/ænˈsiːəs/; Ancient Greek: Ἀγκαῖος Ankaîos) is attributed to two heroes in Greek mythology. Both were among the Argonauts, and each met his death at the tusks of a boar. They are often confused with one another.

- Ancaeus, son of Poseidon.
- Ancaeus, son of Lycurgus.
