= Phoenix (Greek mythology) =

Set of mythological Greek characters

In Greek mythology, Phoenix or Phoinix (Ancient Greek: Φοῖνιξ Phoinix, gen.: Φοίνικος Phoinikos) may refer to the following individuals and a creature:

- Phoenix, a legendary bird
- Phoenix, son of Amyntor.
- Phoenix, son of King Agenor of Tyre.
- Phoenix, a chieftain who came as Guardian of the young Hymenaeus when they joined Dionysus in his campaign against India.
