= Oenoe (mythology) =

Name of six people in Greek mythology

In Greek mythology, the name Oenoe or Oinoe (/ˈɛnoʊ.iː/; Ancient Greek: Οἰνόη, lit. 'winy') may refer to:

- Oenoe, an Arcadian nymph, one of the nurses of infant Zeus. She is probably the same as Oeneis, a possible mother of Pan, by Zeus.
- Oenoe, an Arcadian nymph. According to a scholion on Euripides, the Tegean writer Ariathus apparently considered her to be the mother of Pan by Aether.
- Oenoe, an impious Pygmy woman, wife of Nicodamas and mother of Mopsus. She was changed by Hera into a crane because of her impiety; Hera also made the Pygmies start a war against cranes. Oenoe, missing her son, would still come near the house where he lived, which caused the war to go on and on. This Oenoe is otherwise known as Gerana.
- Oenoe, eponym of a deme in Attica (now Oinoi), sister of Epochus.
- Oenoe or Oenoie, Naiad nymph of the homonymous island, mother of Sicinus by Thoas.
- Oenoe, a Maenad follower of Dionysus.
