= Enalus =

Man in Greek mythology

Enalus or Enalos (Ancient Greek: Ἔναλος, romanized: Énalos) was a man from Lesbos in ancient Greek mythology.

The Penthelides, the first settlers in Lesbos, had received an oracle from Amphitrite commanding them to sacrifice a bull to Poseidon and a virgin to Amphitrite and the Nereides, as soon as they should, on their journey to Lesbos, come to the rock Mesogeion. The leaders of the colonists accordingly caused their daughters to draw lots, the result of which was, that the daughter of Smintheus or Phineus was to be sacrificed.

When she was on the point of being thrown into the sea, her lover, Enalus, embraced her, and leaped with her into the deep. But both were saved by dolphins. Once the sea all around Lesbos rose in such high billows, that no one ventured to approach it; Enalus alone had the courage to do so, and when he returned from the sea, he was followed by polyps, the greatest of which was carrying a stone, which Enalus took from it, and dedicated in a temple.
