= Aconteus =

Several individuals in Greek mythology

In Greek mythology, Aconteus (Ancient Greek: Ἀκόντιος, romanized: Akóntios, lit. 'javelin') may refer to the following distinct individuals:

- Aconteus, an Ethiopian chief who was on Perseus' side at the moment of the fight between the hero and Phineus at the court of Cepheus, Andromeda's father. He was turned into a stone when he saw the head of Medusa.
- Aconteus, an Arcadian who fought in the army of the Seven against Thebes. He was killed by Phegeus, during the war.
- Acontius, a man from Ceos who fell in love with Cydippe and threw at her an apple in order to trick her into marriage.
