= Side (wife of Orion) =

Wife of Orion in Greek mythology

In ancient Greek and Roman mythology, Side (Note: Side /saɪdɪ/, SYE-dee; Ancient Greek: Σίδη, romanized: Sídē, lit. 'pomegranate', pronounced [sǐːdɛː].) is a little-known figure, the first wife of the great hunter Orion. Side challenged the goddess Hera in beauty so her punishment was to be thrown into Hades, the Underworld. Side's myth is only attested in the Bibliotheca, a compilation of Greek myths by pseudo-Apollodorus, a Greek writer of the second century.

== Etymology ==
Side's name comes from the ancient Greek noun σίδη, which translates to "pomegranate", referring to both the tree and the fruit it produces. Robert Beekes and Furnée suggested that all of its variant spellings—such as σίβδη (síbdē), ξίμβα (xímba), and σίβδα (síbda)—point to a Pre-Greek origin of the word, while Witczak suggested a western Anatolian root. The spelling σίδη was common in the Boeotian dialect of Greek.

== Family ==
No parentage or family is mentioned for Side, though it seems her homeland was Boeotia, like her husband. She married the hunter Orion, and might have been the mother of his daughters Menippe and Metioche, although this is not stated.

== Mythology ==
Side's tale is very short. Before Orion's adventures with Oenopion or Artemis, he was married to the beautiful Side. But Side foolishly tried to rival Hera, the queen of the gods, in beauty, and for that offence Hera cast her into the Underworld. There is one more mention of this Side; in the Art of Love Ovid writes that Orion wandered pale in the woods for Side.

== Symbolism ==
As 'side' is the ancient Greek word for “pomegranate”, some scholars have suggested that the union of Side and Orion is a mythical expression of the ripening of the pomegranates during autumn, the season when the constellation Orion is visible in the night sky. The pomegranate fruit was also seen as a symbol of sensuality and fertility, and thus it was connected to Aphrodite, the goddess of love and fertility; it was also used as birth-control. Fontenrose on the other hand disagreed that Side's name and pomegranates had anything to do with Orion's myth.

Karl Kerenyi compared the story of Side to two other Greek myths concerning pomegranates; the story of the goddess Persephone, who was abducted by Hades and taken to the Underworld and forced to stay there for several months a year due to her consuming some pomegranate seeds, and the girl Side, whose blood turned into a pomegranate tree after she killed herself on her mother's grave to avoid being raped by her father Ictinus. All three stories share a common theme of a pomegranate-related maiden who dies, either literally or metaphorically, and is led to the Underworld. Kerenyi summarized the motif as a woman who has to go down to the Underworld for the benefit of her community.

According to Hofer and Rose, Side was connected with the town of Sidae in Boeotia, where pomegranate trees were abundant, and the pomegranate symbolises her descent to Hades, as seen in the connection with Persephone. Side herself might have been a personification of the tree.

An ancient Greek colony in the region of Pamphylia (on the southern coast of Asia Minor) was and is still called Side, and coins from that city displayed pomegranate fruits on them. Other cities of Asia Minor called Side include one in Caria and another in Pontus.

== See also ==
Other women who challenged Hera and were punished:

- Gerana
- Antigone
- Rhodope

== Bibliography ==
- Antoninus Liberalis, The Metamorphoses of Antoninus Liberalis translated by Francis Celoria (Routledge 1992). Online version at the Topos Text Project.
- Apollodorus, The Library with an English Translation by Sir James George Frazer, F.B.A., F.R.S. in 2 Volumes, Cambridge, MA, Harvard University Press; London, William Heinemann Ltd. 1921. ISBN 0-674-99135-4. Online version at the Perseus Digital Library.
- Beekes, Robert S. P. (2010). Lucien van Beek (ed.). Etymological Dictionary of Greek. Leiden Indo-European Etymological Dictionary Series. Vol. ΙΙ. Leiden, the Netherlands: Brill Publications. ISBN 978-90-04-17419-1.
- Bell, Robert E. (1991). Women of Classical Mythology: A Biographical Dictionary. ABC-Clio. ISBN 9780874365818.
- Cyrino, Monica S. (June 25, 2010). Aphrodite. Gods and Heroes of the Ancient World. New York and London: Routledge. ISBN 978-0-415-77523-6.
- Fontenrose, Joseph Eddy (1981). Orion: The Myth of the Hunter and the Huntress. CA, United States: University of California Press. ISBN 0-520-09632-0.
- Grimal, Pierre (1987). The Dictionary of Classical Mythology. Wiley-Blackwell. ISBN 0-631-13209-0.
- Hard, Robin (2004). The Routledge Handbook of Greek Mythology: Based on H.J. Rose's "Handbook of Greek Mythology". Routledge. ISBN 9780415186360.
- Hill, Sir George Francis (1897). Catalogue of the Greek Coins of Lycia, Pamphylia, and Pisidia. Catalogue of the Greek Coins in the British Museum. Vol. 19. London, UK: Trustees of the British Museum.
- Kerenyi, Karl (1967). Eleusis: Archetypal Image of Mother and Daughter. Translated by Ralph Manheim. New York City, New York: Pantheon Books.
- Liddell, Henry George; Scott, Robert (1940). A Greek-English Lexicon, revised and augmented throughout by Sir Henry Stuart Jones with the assistance of Roderick McKenzie. Oxford: Clarendon Press. Online version at Perseus.tufts project.
- Loehr, Johanna (October 1, 2006). "Orion". In Cancik, Hubert; Schneider, Helmuth (eds.). Brill's New Pauly. Translated by Christine F. Salazar. Heidelberg: Brill Reference Online. doi:10.1163/1574-9347_bnp_e900750. ISSN 1574-9347.
- Ovid, Ars Amatoria in The Love Poems, with an English prose translation by A. S. Kline, 2001. ISBN 978-1507893227. Text available online at Poetry in Translation.
- Roscher, Wilhelm Heinrich (1909). Ausführliches Lexikon der griechischen und römischen Mythologie [Detailed dictionary of Greek and Roman mythology] (in German). Vol. IV: Q–S. Leipzig: Teubner-Verlag.
- Rose, Herbert J. (2004). A Handbook of Greek Mythology (6th ed.). London, New York: Routledge. ISBN 0-415-04601-7.
- Sear, David R. (1978). Greek coins and their values. London, UK: Seaby. ISBN 978-0-900652-46-2.
- Witczak, Krzysztof Tomasz; Zadka, Małgorzata (2014). "Ancient Greek σίδη as a borrowing from a Pre-Greek substratum/On the Anatolian origin of Ancient Greek σίδη". Graeco-Latina Brunensia. 19 (1–2).
