= Lophis =

In Greek mythology, Lophis (Ancient Greek: Λόφις) was the young son of a ruler of Haliartus, Boeotia.

== Mythology ==
Legend has it that Haliartus was once an arid land lacking fresh water sources. Lophis' father went to inquire the oracle in Delphi as to whether there was a possible way to supply the region with water, and received an answer in accordance with which he had to kill the first person he would meet upon return home. This person happened to be his son Lophis, whom the king did not hesitate to slay nevertheless. Mortally wounded, Lophis still managed to run around for a short while before he fell down dead. From the flow of his blood rose up a river which was named Lophis after the young man.

A similar motif occurs in the story of Idomeneus and his son, and, in Biblical mythology, of Jephthah and his daughter.
