= Bianna =

Ancient Greek legendary woman

In Greek mythology, Bianna (Ancient Greek: Βίαννα, romanized: Bíanna) was a young unmarried woman from Biennus (modern Viannos) in Crete, according to Stephanus of Byzantium. After a famine forced a mass emigration, she was among those who fled to an area of Gaul along the river Rhône. During a dance, a chasm opened up in the earth and engulfed her.

According to legend, their companions gave her name to a place, Bienna, which later became the capital of the Celtic Allobroges (Vienne in the Dauphiné).

== See also ==
- Pyrene
- Greeks in pre-Roman Gaul
- Daphne

== Sources ==
- Stephanus of Byzantium, Ethnica, edited by August Meineike (1790-1870), published 1849. The Greek text in the public domain. A few entries from this important ancient handbook of place names have been translated by Brady Kiesling. Topos Text.
