= Rhodopis and Euthynicus =

Pair of lovers in Greek mythology

In ancient Greek mythology, Rhodopis (Ancient Greek: Ῥοδῶπις, romanized: Rhodôpis, lit. 'rosy-faced', Ancient Greek pronunciation: [r̥odɔ̂ːpis]) and Euthynicus (Note: A rare name, as Futre Pinheiro, Bierl & Beck note.) (Ancient Greek: Εὐθύνικος, romanized: Euthúnikos) are two young hunters sworn to chastity who incurred the wrath of Aphrodite, the goddess of love and beauty. Their myth is attested in two late sources; Leucippe and Clitophon, a Greek second-century AD romance novel by Achilles Tatius, and the Byzantine Drosilla and Charikles novel by Niketas Eugenianos, written in the twelfth century.

== Mythology ==
Rhodopis was a beautiful chaste maiden who kept her hair short and loved to hunt in the forests. Artemis, the maiden goddess of the hunt, took notice of her, and invited Rhodopis to join her in the hunt, and thus the young girl shunned marriage as well as all kinds of romantic love. Aphrodite, the goddess of love, overheard Rhodopis swearing her oath of chastity to the goddess and immediately grew infuriated. Similarly, the young Euthynicus of Ephesus was another deeply devoted hunter who was averse to all delights of romance just like Rhodopis.

One day that Artemis was not around, Aphrodite contrived to make the game they were playing run in the same direction, and after convincing her bow-bearing son Eros that Rhodopis and Euthynicus's chaste lifestyle was a grave insult to both him and her as deities of love and desire, commanded him to strike them both with his love-inducing arrows. Eros did as told, and the two hunters immediately fell in love with one another.

Then the two withdrew to a cavern and there they broke their chastity vows. Meanwhile Artemis caught sight of Aphrodite laughing, and understood what had happened. In anger over the broken vow she metamorphosed Rhodopis into a fountain called Styx right on the spot where she had lost her virginity. For that reason, any young woman suspected of impurity was made to step into the fountain thereafter, as a testing place; if virgin as claimed, the water would only cover up to her knees, but if not it would come up all the way to her neck. Euthynicus's own fate following the incident is not touched upon.

A character from the novel, Melite, is subjected to such a test. Melite and Clitophon, in spite of their vows of faithfulness to their respective partners, surrender to their urges and lie with each other. In a sense, Aphrodite and Rhodopis hide Melite's, an adulteress, affair under the waters of the spring, in a similar rite in which a sympathetic adulteress is judged innocent.

== Interpretation of the myth ==
This myth of a sworn companion to Artemis breaking their vow is similar to the myth of the Arcadian princess Callisto, while Aphrodite's ire and revenge due to their rejection of love parallels the story of Hippolytus, whose central theme is the antagonism between Aphrodite and Artemis and the mutually-excluding domains they represent. There have been some hypotheses that the myths about Artemis's (female) companions breaking their vows were originally about Artemis herself, before her characterization shifted to that of a forever maiden who fiercely defends her virginity.

The element of the spring Rhodopis was transformed into being used as a testing place of sexual innocence has similarities with another ancient myth Tatius recorded, that of Syrinx. In the standard tale, Syrinx is a nymph who ran away from the amorous advances of Pan, the god of the countryside. Syrinx transformed into reeds in order to escape him, and Pan used the newly-formed plant to create his panpipes, his defining musical instrument. Tatius adds that Pan left some panpipes in a cave that will sound a melody if a maiden passes her virginity test.

== Iconography ==
The myth has no known antecedent in surviving ancient Greek or Roman literature, however in a calyx-crater from circa 340-330 BC attributed to the Darius Painter Rhodopis is identified (as Rhodope) among several other figures, among them the intimidating presence of Artemis and Aphrodite, and even Hippolytus. The calyx-crater seems to attest a variant of the myth above in which Rhodope is called to prove her sexual innocence before a king named Scythes. The god Apollo is also depicted on the vase, indicating an earlier version where he is the seducer, and the progenitor (through Rhodope) of the Cicones. However the name and lover change indicate that the myth had already been adapted in an Anatolian background. This otherwise unknown narrative could perhaps be sourced from a fourth-century tragedy that has been lost to time.

== See also ==
- Hippolytus of Athens
- Polyphonte
- Callisto
- Titanis
- Echemeia
- Zariadres

== Bibliography ==
- Avery, Catherine B., ed. (1962). New Century Classical Handbook. New York, US: Appleton-Century-Crofts.
- Bell, Robert E. (1991). Women of Classical Mythology: A Biographical Dictionary. California, United States: ABC-Clio. ISBN 9780874365818.
- Bremmer, Jan N. (October 4, 2022). "Achilles Tatius and Heliodorus in Christian East Syria". In H.L.J. Vanstiphout (ed.). All those Nations: Cultural Encounters within and with the Near East. BRILL publications. ISBN 90-5693-032-X.
- Forbes Irving, Paul M. C. (1990). Metamorphosis in Greek Myths. Clarendon Press. ISBN 0-19-814730-9.
- Foskett, Mary F. (June 25, 2002). A Virgin Conceived: Mary and Classical Representations of Virginity. Indiana, USA: Indiana University Press. ISBN 0-253-34055-1.
- Futre Pinheiro, Marília P.; Bierl, Anton; Beck, Roger (October 29, 2013). Intende, Lector - Echoes of Myth, Religion and Ritual in the Ancient Novel. Berlin, Boston: De Gruyter. ISBN 978-3-11-031181-5.
- Grimal, Pierre (1987). The Dictionary of Classical Mythology. Wiley-Blackwell. ISBN 0-631-13209-0.
- Konstan, David (1994). Sexual Symmetry: Love in the Ancient Novel and Related Genres. Princeton, New Jersey: Princeton University Press. ISBN 0-691-03341-2.
- Lefteratou, Anna (December 4, 2017). Mythological Narratives: The Bold and Faithful Heroines of the Greek Novel. Berlin, Germany: De Gruyter. ISBN 978-3-11-052732-2.
- Liddell, Henry George; Scott, Robert (1940). A Greek-English Lexicon, revised and augmented throughout by Sir Henry Stuart Jones with the assistance of Roderick McKenzie. Oxford: Clarendon Press. Online version at Perseus.tufts project.
- Ovid (1916). Metamorphoses. Loeb Classical Library 42. Vol. I: Books 1-8. Translated by Frank Justus Miller, revised by G. P. Goold. Cambridge, MA: Harvard University Press.
- Merriam-Webster, Inc. (1995). Merriam-Webster's Encyclopedia of Literature. Merriam-Webster. ISBN 9780877790426.
- Paschalis, Michael; Panayotakis, Stelios (2013). The Construction of the Real and the Ideal in the Ancient Novel. Barkhuis Publishing & Groningen University Library. ISBN 9789491431258.
- Smith, Rowland (1901). The Greek romances of Heliodorus, Longus and Achilles Tatius; comprising the Ethiopics; or, Adventures of Theagenes and Chariclea; The pastoral amours of Daphnis and Chloe; and The loves of Citopho and Leucippe. London: G. Bell and Sons.
- Strelan, Rick (1996). "Paul, Artemis, and the Jews in Ephesus". Beihefte zur Zeitschrift für die neutestamentliche Wissenschaft. 80. Berlin, New York City: De Gruyter. ISBN 9783110150209. ISSN 0171-6441.
- Taplin, Oliver (2007). Pots & Plays: Interactions between Tragedy and Greek Vase-painting of the Fourth Century BC (PDF). Los Angeles, USA: The J. Paul Getty Museum. ISBN 978-0-89236-807-5.
