= Gerana =

Pygmy Queen in Greek mythology

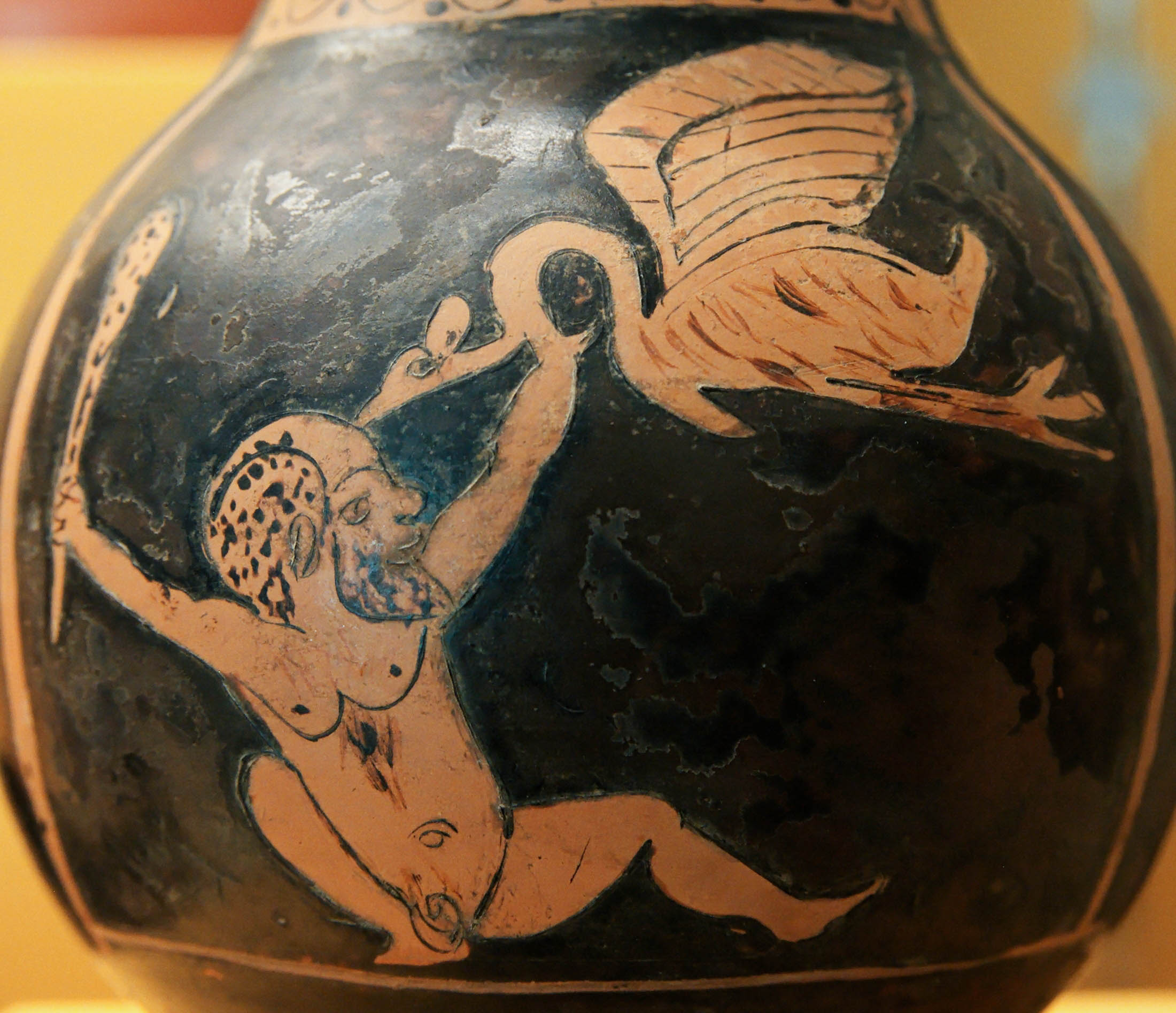
A Pygmy fights a crane, Attic red-figure chous, ca. 430–420 BC, National Archaeological Museum of Spain.

Gerana, (Note: Ancient Greek: Γεράνα, romanized: Gerána, lit. 'she-crane' pronounced [gerána].) sometimes also called Oenoe, (Note: Ancient Greek: Οἰνόη, romanized: Oinóē, lit. 'wine-ish' pronounced [oi̯nóɛː].) is a queen of the Pygmy folk in Greek mythology, who incurred the wrath of the goddess Hera and was subsequently turned into a bird bearing her name, the crane. (Note: Ancient Greek: γέρανος, romanized: géranos pronounced [géranos].) This etiological tale explains the ancient rivalry between the Pygmies and the cranes, and also serves as a cautionary tale against the people who hubristically claimed to be better than even the gods themselves.

Gerana's story bears some resemblance to that of Lamia, who was also a beautiful woman cursed by Hera and transformed into something unappealing, and Antigone, who also compared herself to the queen of the gods and was changed by her into a bird.

== Etymology ==
The proper name Γεράνα is a modified spelling of γέρανος, which is the Ancient Greek word for crane. It derives from the Proto-Indo-European root *gerh_{2}-en-/-eu-, meaning the same thing; cognate with the English word 'crane.' It seems to be attested in Mycenaean Greek in the dative plural form gerenai (Linear B: 𐀐𐀩𐀙𐀂, ke-re-na-i), though Beekes expressed some doubt over it.

== Mythology ==
According to Antoninus Liberalis, who attributes the story to the Hellenistic writer Boeus, who authored the lost poem Ornithogony (or the "birth of the birds"), she was born to the Pygmies, a very beautiful but graceless girl who shunned the worship of Hera and Artemis. She married Nicodamas, who unlike her was good and sensible, and had a son by him, Mopsus. The other Pygmies brought many gifts for the newborn infant, but Hera, enraged that Gerana would not worship her, elongated her neck and turned her into a crane.

Wishing to keep close to her child, Gerana as a crane would fly from roof to roof, but the people armed themselves and chased her away, and thus arose the rivalry between the Pygmies and cranes. Athenaeus, who also quotes Boeus in his Deipnosophistae, says that according to him Gerana was worshipped as a goddess by her people, while she herself only had contempt for goddesses like Artemis and Hera, so Hera quickly turned her into a crane, a bird considered very ugly, and further made the Pygmies hate cranes. Apparently he also wrote that additionally Gerana and Nicodamas became the parents of a tortoise.

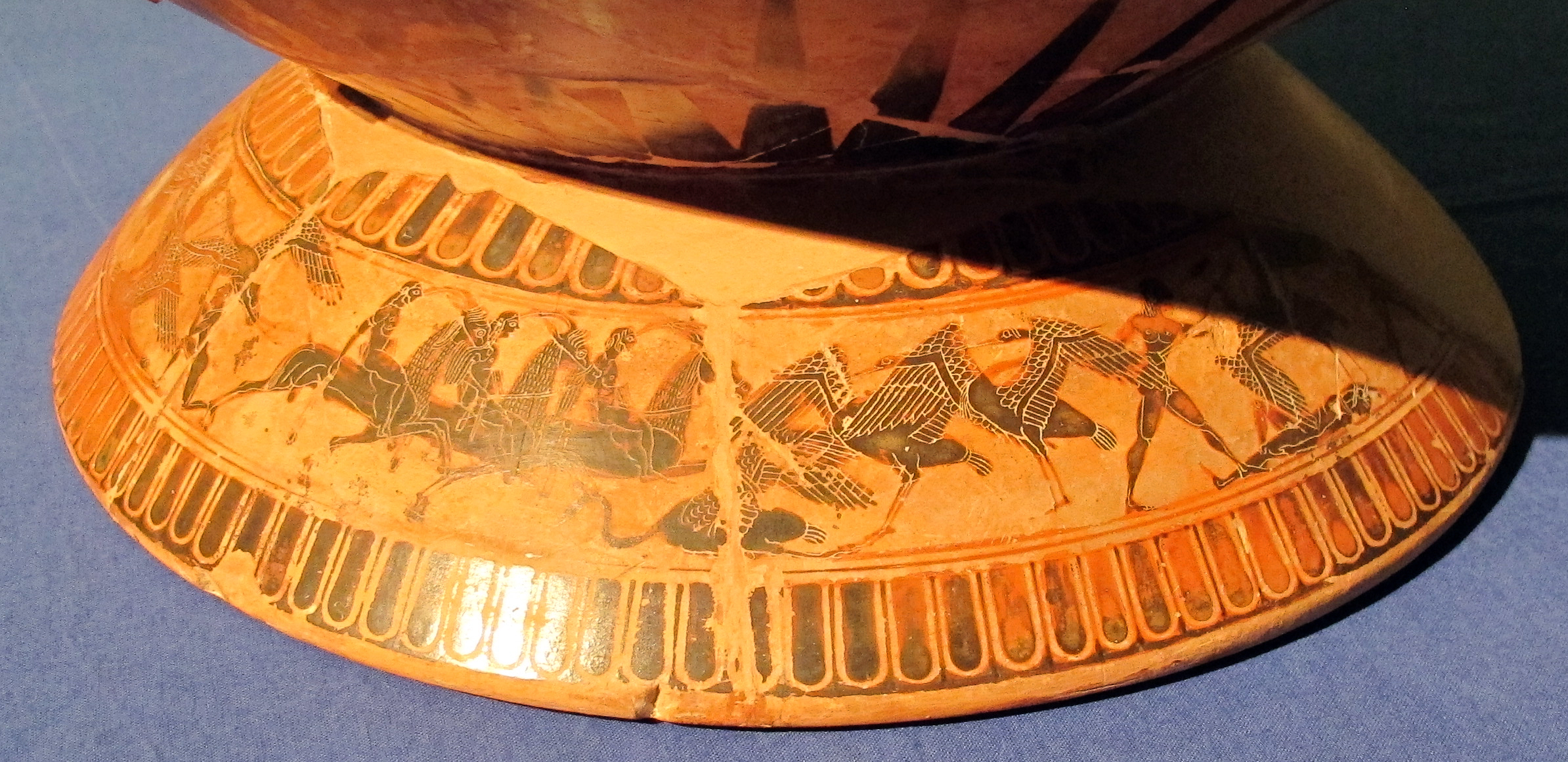
The battle between the cranes and Pygmies depicted on the François vase, ca. 570-560 BC, National Archaeological Museum of Florence, Italy.

Gerana and her fate was woven by the goddess Athena into her tapestry during her weaving contest between her and the Lydian maiden Arachne, as a warning against the girl about the fate of those who dared to compare themselves to the gods. Ovid says that Gerana foolishly saw herself as equal to the Heavens, so Hera turned her into a crane after besting her in some contest and forced her to wage war against her own people; perhaps Gerana boasted of being more beautiful than the queen of the gods. Arachne failed to understand Athena's message and suffered the same fate as Gerana.

Antoninus Liberalis calls this woman Oenoe, (meaning 'wine-y') while Ovid does not give her a name at all; it is Athenaeus and Aelian, a third-century AD author, who call her Gerana. Aelian says that the Pygmies worshipped their beautiful queen Gerana as a goddess, paying her honours above a those fit for a human. Gerana claimed to surpass the goddesses Hera, Artemis, Athena and Aphrodite all in beauty, so Hera transformed her into a hideous crane as punishment for her insolence.

== Ancient culture ==
The opening six lines of the third book of the eight-century BC epic poem the Iliad implies that Gerana's tale, or at least some version of it, might have been known as early as Homer. According to Russian philologist Irina V. Shtal an earlier–now lost–epic poem called the Geranomachia ("battle against the cranes"), one of the many light-hearted parodies of the Iliad written in ancient times, was erroneously attributed to Homer in antiquity. It is possible that all three distinct variations of Gerana's story can be traced all the way back to the Ornithogony by Boeus.

Joseph Fontenrose in turn identifies the hubristic Gerana with Lamia, another mythological woman punished by Hera and turned into a hideous beast. Fontenrose notes that they are both beautiful queens connected to Africa who enrage Hera, undergo transformation as punishment at her hands and are deprived of their children.

Boios' version of Gerana's myth might have influenced Ovid's treatment of Antigone's story, another beautiful royal woman who compared herself to Hera and is transformed into a bird, a stork (cranes and storks were often classified together).

== See also ==
Other transformation myths in Greek legend:

- Arge
- Cassiopeia
- Periphas
- Side
- Arethusa of Boeotia
- Chione
- Side, who also angered Hera
