= Achilles (son of Zeus) =

Greek mythological character

In Greek mythology, Achilles, also spelled Achilleus ([akʰilˈleu̯s]; Ancient Greek: Ἀχιλλεύς, romanized: Akhilleús), was the son of Zeus and Lamia, and the main subject of a minor myth. He is not to be confused with the more famous Achilles, the hero of the Trojan War.

== Etymology ==
Mycenaean Greek tablets attest to the personal name Achilles in the forms a-ki-re-u (Linear B: 𐀀𐀑𐀩𐀄) and a-ki-re-we (Linear B: 𐀀𐀑𐀩𐀸); the latter being the dative of the former.

Achilles' name can be analyzed as a combination of ἄχος (áchos) "distress, pain, sorrow, grief" and λαός (laós) "people, soldiers, nation", resulting in a proto-form *Akhí-lāu̯os "he who has the people distressed" or "he whose people have distress". Furthermore, laós has been construed by Gregory Nagy, following Leonard Palmer, to mean "a corps of soldiers", a muster.

Some researchers deem the name a loan word, possibly from a Pre-Greek language. Robert S. P. Beekes has suggested a Pre-Greek origin of the name, based among other things on the coexistence of -λλ- and -λ- in epic language, which may account for a palatalized phoneme /l^{y}/ in the original language.

== Mythology ==
Achilles was a man of an irresistible beauty, and won a beauty contest judged by Pan, the god of wilderness. Aphrodite, the goddess of beauty and love, was irritated and so she made Pan fall in love with the nymph Echo, who spurned him, and made Achilles become as ugly and unattractive as he had been pretty and attractive. It is not clear whether Aphrodite was simply dissatisfied with the result as part of the audience, or she herself lost to Achilles as a contestant, but the latter seems likely enough.

== See also ==
- Tiresias
- Actaeon
- Siproites
- Arachne

== Bibliography ==
- Beekes, Robert S. P. (2009). Lucien van Beek (ed.). Etymological Dictionary of Greek. Leiden Indo-European Etymological Dictionary Series. Vol. 1. Leiden, the Netherlands: Brill Publications. ISBN 978-90-04-17420-7.
- Hartley, Beth (June 2014). "Ptolemy and the Mythological Revisionist Games of the Imperial Period". Novel Research: Fiction and Authority in Ptolemy Chennus (PDF) (PhD). University of Exeter.
- Palmer, Leonard (1963). The Interpretation of Mycenaean Greek Texts. Oxford: Clarendon Press. ISBN 978-0198131441.
- Sigel, Dorothea; Ley, Anne; Bleckmann, Bruno (2006). "Achilles". In Cancik, Hubert; Schneider, Helmuth; et al. (eds.). Achilles. Brill's New Pauly. Brill Reference Online. doi:10.1163/1574-9347_bnp_e102220.
