= Boios =

Boios (Βοῖος), Latinized Boeus, was a Greek grammarian and mythographer, remembered chiefly as the author of a lost work on the transformations of mythic figures into birds, his Ornithogonia. Ornithogonia was translated into Latin by Aemilius Macer, a friend of Ovid, who was the author of the most familiar such collections of metamorphoses. In the 2nd century CE, Antoninus Liberalis gave extremely brief summaries of the contents of some of the myths collected in Ornithogonia.

Boiai, Latinized Boeae, was a village in Lacedaemon, at the head of the Gulf of Laconia, that, as Pausanias was informed, had been founded by the eponymous Boeus, one of the Heracleidae (Pausanias, iii.22.12).
