= Menippe and Metioche =

Greek mythological women

In Greek mythology, Menippe (/mɪˈnɪpiː/; Ancient Greek: Μενίππη, romanized: Meníppē, lit. 'courageous mare, sipper') and Metioche (Ancient Greek: Μητιόχη, romanized: Mētiókhē) were daughters of the hunter Orion. They feature in a brief myth about human sacrifice preserved in the works of Ovid and Antoninus Liberalis.

== Family ==
Menippe and Metioche were the daughters of Orion by an unnamed mother; although their mother is not given a name, in other sources the first wife of Orion is called Side. After Orion was killed by Artemis, the girls were raised by their mother while Athena taught them the art of weaving and Aphrodite gave them beauty.

== Mythology ==
Once Menippe and Metioche's homeland Aonia at the base of Mt. Helicon was struck by a plague, and the oracle of Apollo Gortynius, when consulted, informed the people that the gods of the Underworld (Note: The rulers of which are Hades and Persephone.) were angry and that they would only be appeased with the sacrifice of two maidens, who were to offer themselves to death of their own accord. Not two girls in the entire land were willing to sacrifice themselves and the plague continue to ravage the land until a woman brought the news of the prophecy to Menippe and Metioche. The two girls then willingly offered themselves for the sake of their countrymen.

After they thrice invoked the infernal gods, they killed themselves with their shuttles, placating the wrath of the two subterranean rulers. Persephone and Hades eventually took pity in them and metamorphosed their dead bodies into comets. The Aonians then erected them a sanctuary near Orchomenus, where a propitiatory sacrifice was offered to them every year by youths and maidens. The Aeolians called these maidens Coronides.

In Ovid's recount of the tale, the daughters of Orion remain unnamed and sacrifice themselves for no distinctly given reason, although a withered tree and gaunt goats on a barren field are mentioned and indicate the presence of a plague. From their ashes, two youths arise and lead the funeral train for their "mothers" and instead of Menippe and Metioche, the youths are referred to as "Coroni".

== See also ==
- Iphigenia
- Binding of Isaac
- Human sacrifice

== Bibliography ==
- Antoninus Liberalis, The Metamorphoses of Antoninus Liberalis translated by Francis Celoria (Routledge 1992). Online version at the Topos Text Project.
- Apollodorus, The Library with an English Translation by Sir James George Frazer, F.B.A., F.R.S. in 2 Volumes, Cambridge, MA, Harvard University Press; London, William Heinemann Ltd. 1921. ISBN 0-674-99135-4. Online version at the Perseus Digital Library. Greek text available from the same website.
- Bane, Theresa (2013). Encyclopedia of Fairies in World Folklore and Mythology. McFarland, Incorporated, Publishers. ISBN 9780786471119.
- Eidinow, Esther (2025). "Air". Metamorphosis, Landscape, and Trauma in Greco-Roman Myth. Oxford University Press.
- Kerenyi, Karl (1951). The Gods of the Greeks. London, UK: Thames and Hudson.
- Publius Ovidius Naso, Metamorphoses translated by Brookes More (1859-1942). Boston, Cornhill Publishing Co. 1922. Online version at the Perseus Digital Library.
- Publius Ovidius Naso, Metamorphoses. Hugo Magnus. Gotha (Germany). Friedr. Andr. Perthes. 1892. Latin text available at the Perseus Digital Library.
