= Ictinus (mythology) =

Greek mythological person

In Greek mythology, Ictinus (Ancient Greek: Ἴκτινος, romanized: Íktinos, lit. 'kite') is a minor figure who tried to rape his daughter and was transformed into a bird, in part of an aetiological myth that attempts to explain the nature of trees and birds. His brief tale survives in the works of Dionysius Periegetes, and might have been an original invention.

== Family ==
The only known member of Ictinus's family is a daughter named Side. Nothing more is known about their family, nor is their homeland named, as most likely both Ictinus and Side were invented for the sake of this story.

== Mythology ==
According to the myth, the kite bird (iktinos) had originally been a man. Ictinus felt incestuous desire for his daughter Side, and chased her down with the intention to rape her. Side fled from him until she reached the gravestone of her dead mother, and killed herself on it. Her blood that spilt on the ground gave rise to a pomegranate tree, while Ictinus himself was transformed into a kite, a bird that hates to rest on pomegranate trees.

== Symbolism ==
Karl Kerenyi compared this story to both the goddess Persephone, who was abducted to the Underworld by Hades and made to stay there thanks to the consumption of pomegranate fruit, and Orion's first wife Side, who angered Hera and was cast in Tartarus. All three stories have the common theme of a maiden who either literally or metaphorically dies and is led to the Underworld, with Ictinus supplanting the subterranean god in the second Side's case. Kerenyi summarized it as "a woman had to go down to the underworld for the benefit of the community."

The pomegranate was seen as a symbol of fertility and Aphrodite, the goddess of love, but more important for that story, apart from the connection it has to kites, is its bright red colour that resembles blood, as Side spilt her own, which gave rise to the tree. The myth has also similar elements with those of Nyctaea and Nyctimene, women who were transformed into something else in their effort to flee their rapacious fathers.

== See also ==
- Myrrha
- Corone
- Nemesis

== Bibliography ==
- Forbes Irving, Paul M. C. (1990). Metamorphosis in Greek Myths. Clarendon Press. ISBN 0-19-814730-9.
- Garzya, Antonius (1955). "Paraphrasis Dionysii Poematis de Aucupio". Byzantion. 25–27 (1). Peeters Publishers, JSTOR: 195–240. JSTOR 44170039.
- Kerenyi, Karl (1967). Eleusis: Archetypal Image of Mother and Daughter. Translated by Ralph Manheim. New York City, New York: Pantheon Books.
- Liddell, Henry George; Scott, Robert (1940). A Greek-English Lexicon, revised and augmented throughout by Sir Henry Stuart Jones with the assistance of Roderick McKenzie. Oxford: Clarendon Press. Online version at Perseus.tufts project.
