= Side (daughter of Ictinus) =

Greek mythological woman

In Greek mythology, Side (Note: Side /saɪdɪ/, SYE-dee; Ancient Greek: Σίδη, romanized: Sídē, lit. 'pomegranate', pronounced [sǐːdɛː].) is a minor figure, a woman who tried to flee from her enamored father and was transformed into a tree in order to escape him, in part of an aetiological myth that attempts to explain the nature of trees and birds. Her brief tale survives in the works of Dionysius Periegetes, an ancient Greek author who is believed to have been born in the city of Alexandria, and to have lived around the time of Roman Emperor Hadrian (reigned 117–138 AD).

== Etymology ==
The ancient Greek noun σίδη translates to "pomegranate", and refers to both the tree and its fruit. Robert Beekes and Furnée suggest that all of its variant spellings–such as σίβδη (síbdē), ξίμβα (xímba), and σίβδα (síbda)–point to a Pre-Greek origin of the word, and Witczak suggests specifically a western Anatolian one.

== Family ==
The only known member of Side's family is a father named Ictinus. Nothing more is known about their family, nor is the land her myth takes place ever named, as most likely both Side and Ictinus were invented for the sake of this story.

== Mythology ==
According to the myth, Side's father Ictinus developed an incestuous desire for his daughter, and chased her down with the intention to rape her. Side fled from him until she reached the gravestone of her dead mother, and killed herself on it to avoid his ravenous advances. Her red blood spilt on the ground and gave rise to a pomegranate tree, while her father himself was transformed into a kite, a bird of prey which, according to Oppian, hates to rest on pomegranate trees.

== Symbolism ==
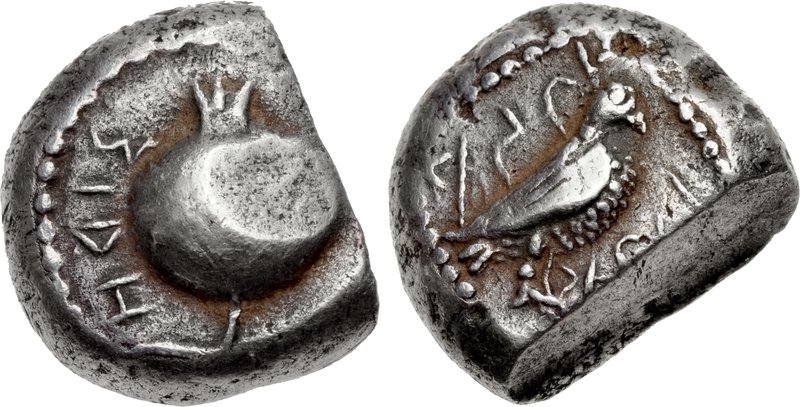
Coin from Side with a pomegranate, circa 490-450 BC

Karl Kerenyi compared this story to both the goddess Persephone, who was abducted to the Underworld by Hades and forced to stay there for several months a year thanks to her consumption of pomegranate fruit, and the hunter Orion's first wife Side, who angered Hera and was cast in Tartarus as punishment. In each of the three stories a maiden associated with the pomegranate dies—literally or metaphorically—and is led to the Underworld. In this Side's case, her father Ictinus supplants the subterranean god who seduces or rapes the maiden. Kerenyi saw their common theme as self-sacrifice to benefit the larger community.

The Side myth parallels that of Nyctaea and Nyctimene, in which a woman is transformed in order to escape a rapacious father.

The pomegranate fruit was seen as a symbol of fertility and Aphrodite, the goddess of love and fertility, possibly because its numerable red seeds suggest procreation and sexuality; it was also used as a contraceptive. The association between pomegranates and fertility can be traced back to the ancient Semitic populations of the Near East, from which it spread to Greece, likely through Aphrodite's cult. The pomegranate's bright red colour symbolized Side's blood that she spilled as she spilt own side to took her life, giving rise to the tree.

An ancient Greek colony in the region of Pamphylia (on the southern coast of Asia Minor (Anatolia, modern Turkey) was and is still called Side, and coins from that city displayed pomegranate fruits. Other Anatolian cities called "Side" include one in Caria and another in Pontus.

== See also ==
Women who fled from their would-be rapists include:

- Corone
- Daphne
- Nyctaea
- Nyctimene

== Bibliography ==
- Beekes, Robert S. P. (2010). Lucien van Beek (ed.). Etymological Dictionary of Greek. Leiden Indo-European Etymological Dictionary Series. Vol. ΙΙ. Leiden, the Netherlands: Brill Publications. ISBN 978-90-04-17419-1.
- Bell, Robert E. (1991). Women of Classical Mythology: A Biographical Dictionary. ABC-Clio. ISBN 9780874365818.
- Cyrino, Monica S. (June 25, 2010). Aphrodite. Gods and Heroes of the Ancient World. New York and London: Routledge. ISBN 978-0-415-77523-6.
- Folkard, Richard (1884). Plant Lore, Legends, and Lyrics: Embracing the Myths, Traditions, Superstitions, and Folk-lore of the Plant Kingdom. Michigan: S. Low, Marston, Searle, and Rivington.
- Forbes Irving, Paul M. C. (1990). Metamorphosis in Greek Myths. Clarendon Press. ISBN 0-19-814730-9.
- Garzya, Antonius (1955). "Paraphrasis Dionysii Poematis de Aucupio". Byzantion. 25–27 (1). Peeters Publishers. JSTOR 44170039.
- Grimal, Pierre (1987). The Dictionary of Classical Mythology. Translated by A. R. Maxwell-Hyslop. New York, USA: Wiley-Blackwell. ISBN 0-631-13209-0.
- Hill, Sir George Francis (1897). Catalogue of the Greek Coins of Lycia, Pamphylia, and Pisidia. Catalogue of the Greek Coins in the British Museum. Vol. 19. London, UK: Trustees of the British Museum.
- Hyginus, Gaius Julius, The Myths of Hyginus. Edited and translated by Mary A. Grant, Lawrence: University of Kansas Press, 1960.
- Kerenyi, Karl (1967). Eleusis: Archetypal Image of Mother and Daughter. Translated by Ralph Manheim. New York City, New York: Pantheon Books.
- Lactantius Placidus (1898). Lactantii Placidi qui dicitur Commentarios in Statii Thebaida it Commentarium in Achilleida recensuit. Translated by Richard Jahnke. Lipsiae: B. G. Tevbneri.
- Liddell, Henry George; Scott, Robert (1940). A Greek-English Lexicon, revised and augmented throughout by Sir Henry Stuart Jones with the assistance of Roderick McKenzie. Oxford: Clarendon Press. Online version at Perseus.tufts project.
- Murr, Josef (1890). Die Pflanzenwelt in der griechischen Mythologie [The Plant World in Greek mythology] (in German). Innsbruck.
- Ovid (1916). Metamorphoses. Loeb Classical Library 42. Vol. I: Books 1-8. Translated by Frank Justus Miller, revised by G. P. Goold. Cambridge, MA: Harvard University Press.
- Roscher, Wilhelm Heinrich (1909). Ausführliches Lexikon der griechischen und römischen Mythologie [Detailed dictionary of Greek and Roman mythology] (in German). Vol. IV. Leipzig: Teubner-Verlag.
- Sear, David R. (1978). Greek coins and their values. London, UK: Seaby. ISBN 978-0-900652-46-2.
- Stone, Damien (May 15, 2017). Pomegranate: A Global History. London, UK: Reaktion Books Ltd. ISBN 9781780237954.
- von Pauly, August Friedrich (1971). Paulys Realencyclopädie der classischen Altertumswissenschaft: Neue Bearbeitung unter Mitwirkung zahlreicher Fachgenossen (in German). Vol. 17, part 2. Germany: Druckenmüller Verlag.
- Witczak, Krzysztof Tomasz; Zadka, Małgorzata (2014). "Ancient Greek σίδη as a borrowing from a Pre-Greek substratum/On the Anatolian origin of Ancient Greek σίδη". Graeco-Latina Brunensia. 19 (1–2).
