= Themisto (disambiguation) =

Themisto may refer to:

== Greek mythology ==
- Themisto, the third and last wife of Athamas
- Themisto (mythology), various figures including:
  - Themisto, a daughter of the river god Inachus, who became the mother of Arcas by Zeus
  - Themisto, one of the Nereids
  - Themisto, daughter of the Hyperborean king Zabius, mother of Galeos by Apollo

== Other meanings ==
- Themisto (moon) of Jupiter
- Themisto (crustacean), a genus of amphipod crustaceans

== See also ==
- Themistocles (disambiguation)
