= Themisto (daughter of Inachus) =

Mother of Arcas in Greek mythology

In Greek mythology, Themisto (/θəˈmɪstoʊ/; Ancient Greek: Θεμιστώ, romanized: Themistṓ, lit. 'belonging to the law or customs') was the daughter of the river god Inachus and the mother of Arcas by Zeus; she was transformed into a bear by Hera.

In other accounts, the usual birth mother of Arcas was called Callisto, daughter of Lycaon or else Megisto, daughter of Ceteus, both women were members of the Arcadian royal family.
