= Narrative art =

Art that tells a story

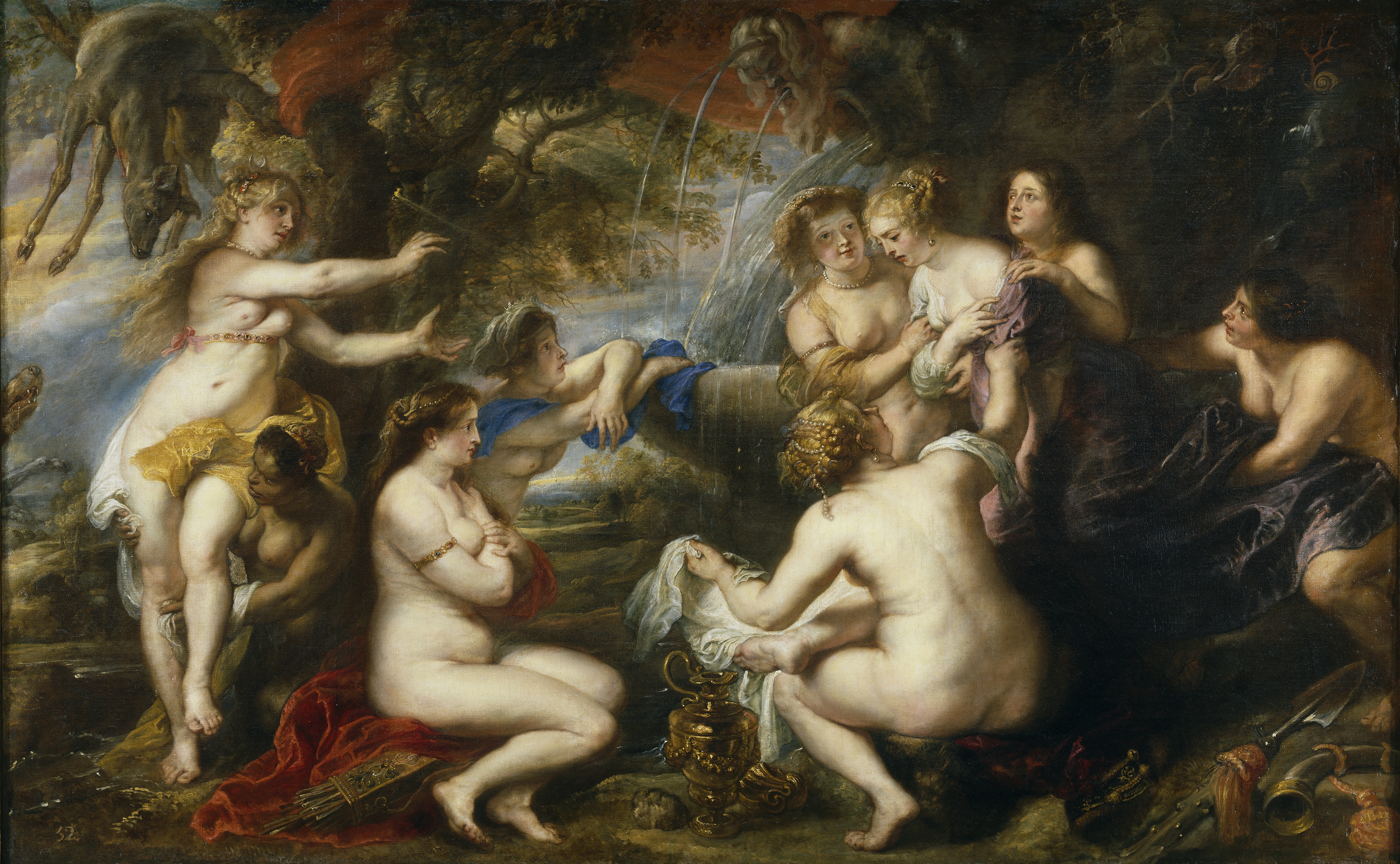
Diana and Callisto by Rubens, c. 1635. A classic history painting with a subject from Greek mythology. It shows the moment when the pregnancy of Callisto is discovered.

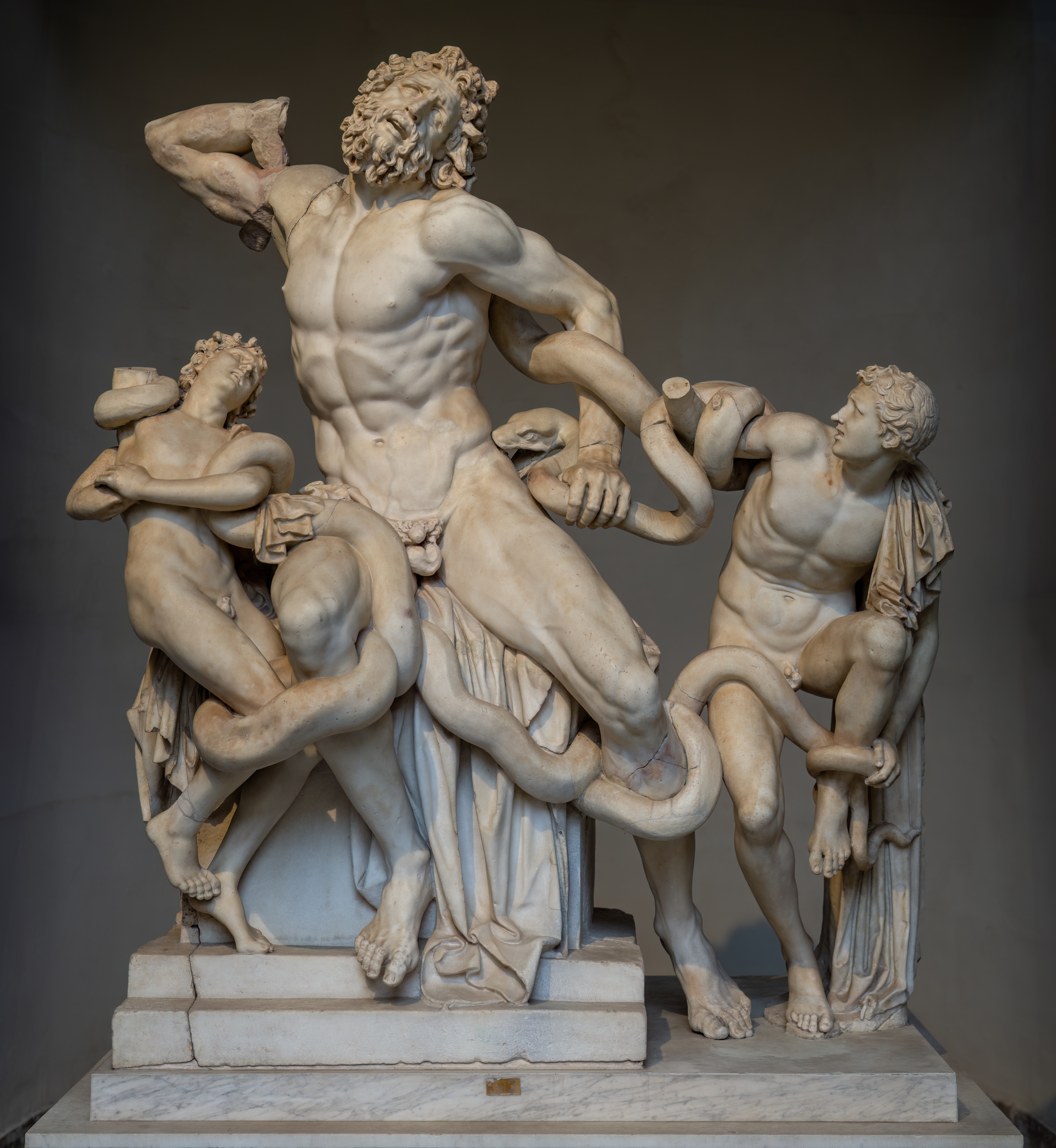
Laocoön and His Sons a sculpture of the 1st century BC or AD, with a scene from classical mythology

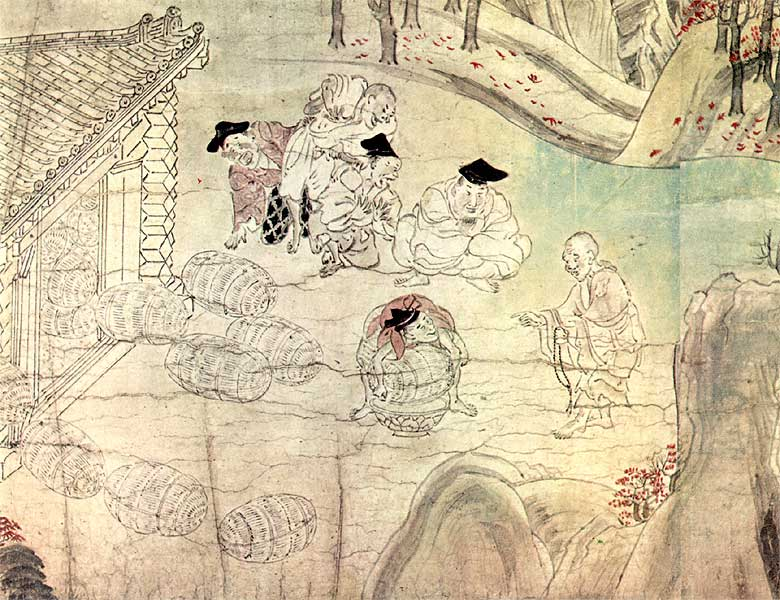
Scene of "Rich man giving a rice ball to the monk", from the 12th-century Japanese Shigisan-engi handscroll

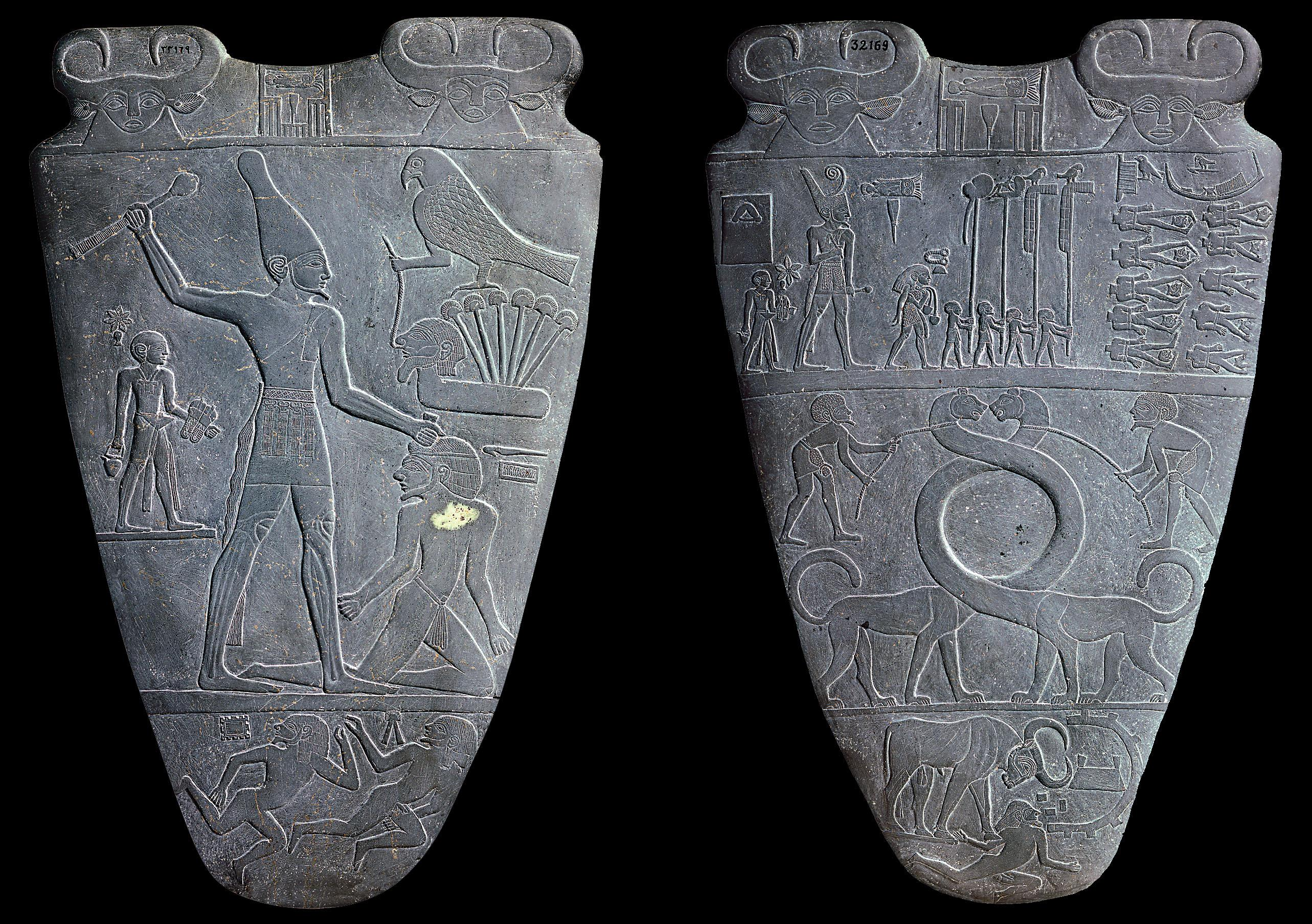
The two sides of the Narmer Palette

Narrative art is art that tells a story, either as one captured moment in an ongoing story or as a sequence of events unfolding over time. More narrowly, and for the purposes of this article, narrative art refers to static art media that tell stories, such as certain instances of sculpture, painting, or architectural ornamentation.

Some of the earliest evidence of human art suggests that people told stories with pictures. Although there are some common features to all narrative art, different cultures have developed idiosyncratic ways to discern narrative action from pictures.

Prior to the advent of literacy most narrative art was done in a simultaneous narrative style with very little overarching organization. Once literacy developed in different parts of the world pictures began to be organized along register lines, like lines on a page, that helped define the direction of the narrative. This method of linking scenes together led to other ways of telling stories in the 20th century, namely the newspaper, comic strips and comic books.

In painting in traditional Western art since the Renaissance, the concept of history painting covers most narrative scenes.

== History ==
Though it requires sophisticated conventions to make the narrative clear, narrative art occurs very early in the history of art. A number of reliefs in the European Bronze Age Rock art of the Iberian Mediterranean Basin show monoscenic narratives of hunting or battle, the former sometimes indicating the movements of hunter or prey with indications of their tracks in a way similar to modern diagrammatic illustrations. One of the earliest works of Ancient Egyptian art is the Narmer Palette relief in the Louvre Museum, which shows a victory of King Narmer (c. 31st century BC) in several scenes.

Narrative art was employed extensively in the Neo-Assyrian Period. Most significantly, the walls of the major Assyrian royal palaces (the Northwest Palace of Assurnasirpal II at Nimrud, the Central Palace of Tiglath-Pileser III at Nimrud, the Palace of Sargon II at Khorsabad, the Southwest Palace of Sennacherib at Nineveh, and the North Palace of Assurbanipal at Nineveh) were lined orthostats sculpted in low relief with scenes depicting the activities of the king (hunting, battle, and ritual). Sometimes, scenes were also depicted on glazed bricks or wall paintings (e.g. at Til Barsip). Bronze bands decorating the doors of Assyrian temples and palaces were also sometimes decorated with scenes of the king's activities in narrative style. The most famous of these are the "Balawat Gates" commissioned by Shalmaneser III for his palace at Balawat (ancient Imgur-Enlil); additional fragmentary bronze gate bands dating to Assurnasirpal II have been found at Balawat, and very poorly preserved fragments from other sites, such as Khorsabad, Nimrud, Assur, and Tell Hadad.

The lives of Jesus and Buddha, the founders of new religions, their followers, and in the case of Buddha also the former lives, were to provide new subject-matter for narrative art, as did elements of older religions such as the Labours of Hercules. Trajan's Column is an exceptional example of Imperial Roman narrative art. In Christian art the Life of Christ in art and Life of the Virgin supplied the most common subjects, based around the incidents celebrated in the major feasts of the church calendar, but the lives of saints gave many others.

Book illustrations are found from ancient times in several cultures, and are very often narrative in nature. There appear to have been some lavishly illustrated books in Western Late Antiquity, no doubt belonging to wealthy collectors, including both classic literary texts (Vergilius Vaticanus and Vergilius Romanus) and biblical texts; the Quedlinburg Itala fragment seems to have had between two and four images facing every text page, and to have been more densely illustrated than any subsequent biblical text in an illuminated manuscript.

== Types ==
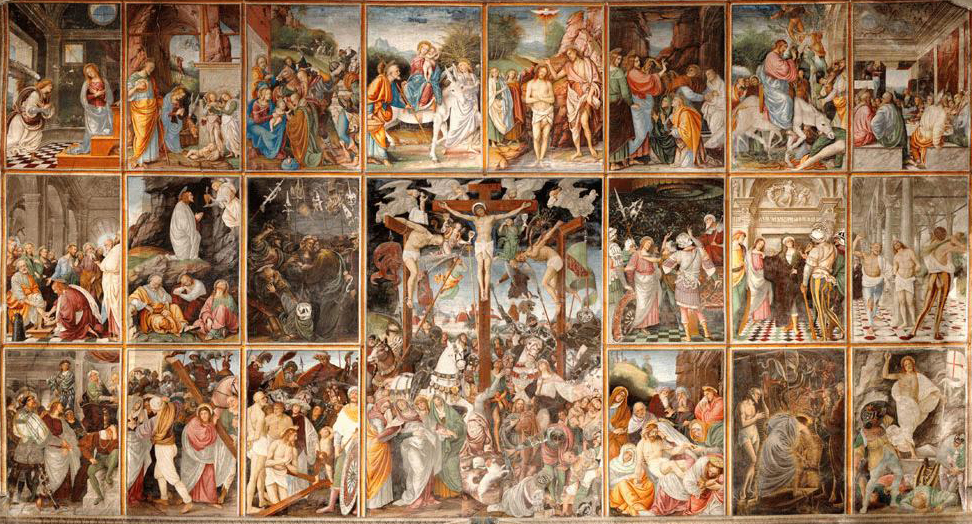
16th-century Italian cycle of the Life of Christ in art in fresco with 21 scenes from Annunciation to Resurrection: Top row: Annunciation, Nativity, Visit of the Three Magi, Flight to Egypt, Baptism of Christ, Raising of Lazarus, Entry to Jerusalem, Last Supper. Middle row: Washing of feet, Agony in the Garden, Arrest of Christ, Trial before the Sanhedrin, Trial before Pilate, Flagellation. Bottom row: Ecce homo, Carrying the cross, Christ falls, Crucifixion, Deposition from the cross, Harrowing of Hell, Resurrection.

Narratives occur in a space and unfold in time. In narrative art, the artist chooses how to portray the story, represent the space, and how to shape time within the artwork. Narrative art can be categorized into various types, also known as modes or styles. A piece of artwork is not limited to only one type of narrative. An artwork may have a narrative type as a whole, as well as portions of the artwork itself that depict separate types of narratives. Several of these types are covered below. A depicted action in itself can suggest a scene or setting:

You can imagine the Trojan War taking place at Troy without having to depict the actual city of Troy. You can show Achilles dragging Hector's body around the city of Troy without having to depict the walls of the city. Nonetheless, the idea that each action is limited to a specific place can still pertain, because the Trojan War did take place at Troy and Achilles did drag Hector's body around the city.

== Simultaneous narrative ==
A simultaneous narrative is a type of narrative that has very little visually discernible organization to those who are not acquainted with its purpose. It can focus on geometric or abstract designs as well as the placement or arrangement of items within the artwork. Simultaneous narratives concentrate on repeatable patterns and redundant systems with a focus on dualities.

== Monoscenic narrative ==
A monoscenic narrative is a type of narrative that represents a single scene. There is no repetition of characters and there is only one action taking place. The scene is one that is easily identifiable in context of the narrative and is of significant importance.

Under this definition, most art that is usually not considered a narrative would fit under the monoscenic narrative type. Narrative art is art that tells a story, either as a moment in an ongoing story or as a sequence of events unfolding over time. This in retrospect makes a good portion of art narrative art. Landscapes and portraits however do not meet the criteria of the definition provided, though they might be, depending on the artist's intention.

=== Achilles kills Penthesilea (amphora) by Exekias ===
Exekias was an ancient Greek vase-painter and potter. A good portion of his vase work included scenes from Greek mythology. He was known for his ability to capture the most critical points of a story and illustrate them into one simple scene. The amphora portraying Achilles killing Penthesilea is such an example.

This monoscenic narrative illustrated on this amphora exemplifies a vital part of the Trojan saga. It is the moment in which Achilles and Penthesilea fall in love. In the heat of battle, Achilles battles Penthesilea and with a fatal blow, causes her helmet to be pushed back. When their eyes meet, it is said that they fall in love. This is ruined by Achilles' inability to control his bloodlust. Due to this tragedy, Achilles refuses to fight and from this many consequences arise that eventually could be linked to his demise.

=== British art tradition ===
A line of development of narrative art begins with William Hogarth, the English painter. His monoscenic depictions of crucial moments in a narrative were taken up in the 19th century by other British painters. The Victorian terms applied to this style were "subject painting" or "anecdotic" painting.

== Continuous narrative ==
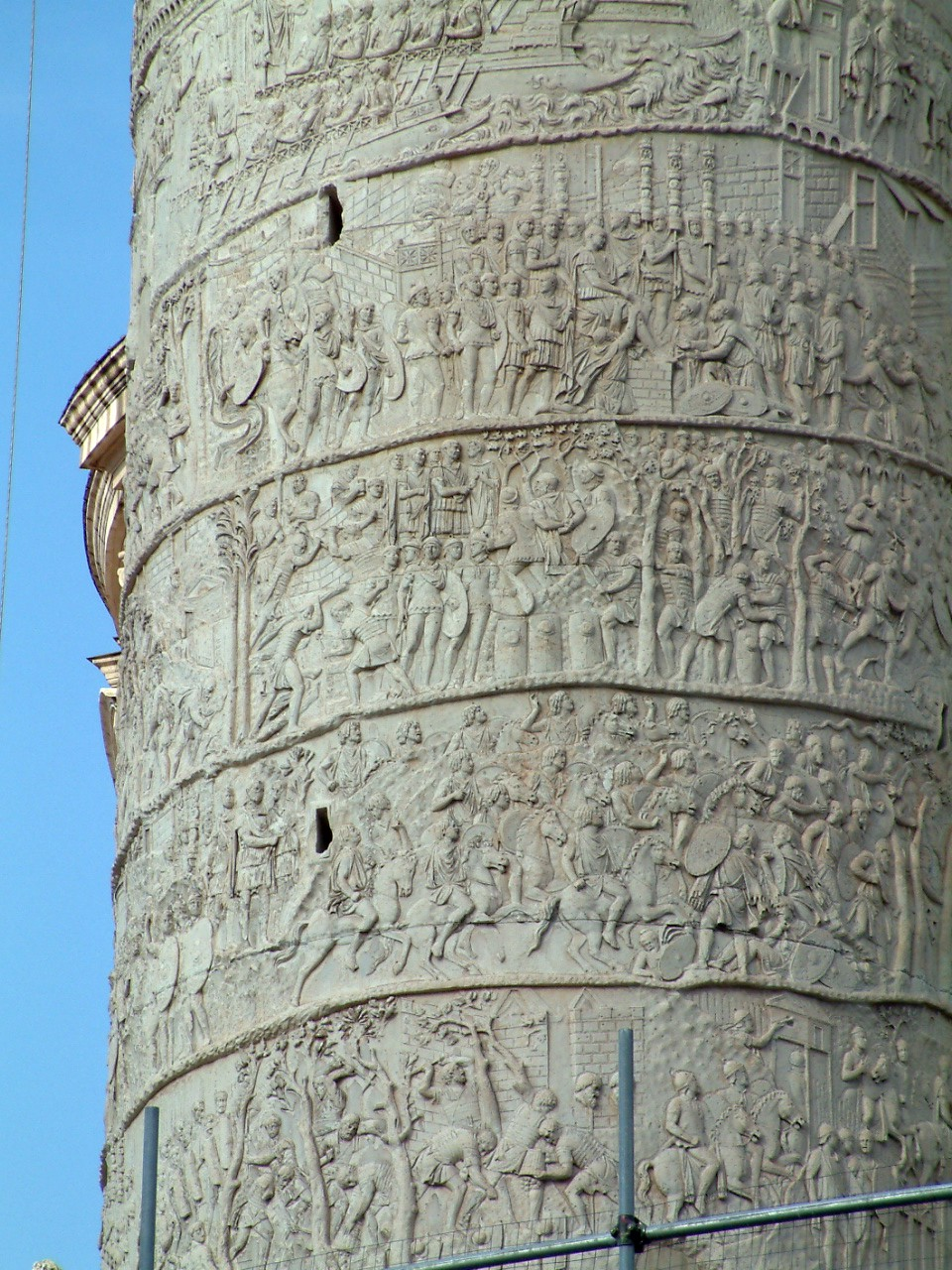
Trajan's Column is an example of a continuous narrative

A continuous narrative is a type of narrative that illustrates multiple scenes of a narrative within a single frame. Multiple actions and scenes are portrayed in a single visual field without any dividers. The sequence of events within the narrative is defined through the reuse of the main character or characters. It emphasizes the change in movement and state of the repeating characters as indicators of scene or phase changes in the narrative.

=== Column of Trajan ===
The Column of Trajan depicts one event: the Dacian Wars. This continuous narrative can be broken down into a series of events. These events flow from one scene to another without any physical indicators such as vertical lines. Because of how the narrative is read, from standing in front of the column, it seems to ebb right to left and then left to right which is common in continuous narratives.

The narrative becomes rather hard to read as the column gets higher. Research suggests that the column was originally planned to be read while walking a circular staircase around the column itself . The story then would not ebb and continue on in a sequential manner.

=== Bayeux Tapestry ===
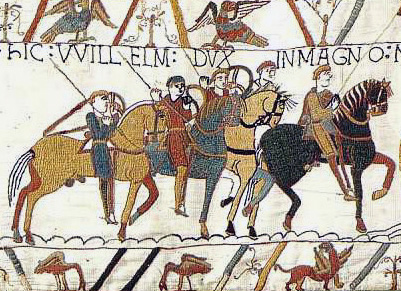
Section of the Bayeux Tapestry

The 'Bayeux Tapestry' (a misnomer as it is really an embroidery not a tapestry) tells the story of the Norman invasion of England in 1066. The theme of the Bayeux Tapestry is treason and deception. The narrative reflects a partisan Norman view of the events of the conquest of England. Though the tapestry seems to be framed because it is separated by registers, horizontal lines, it is still a continuous narrative. Registers are needed in order to separate a story to fit within a certain area. If cut up and placed next to each other, a continuous narrative would exist. A continuous narrative does not have any separation between scenes and actions.

== Synoptic narrative ==
A synoptic narrative depicts a single scene in which a character or characters are portrayed multiple times within a frame to convey that multiple actions are taking place. This causes the sequence of events to be unclear within the narrative. Synoptic narratives typically provide visual cues that convey the sequence, but still might be difficult to decipher for those unfamiliar with the story.

=== Chaddanta Jataja, Amaravati ===
An instance of a synoptic narrative is one represented in a medallion from the stupa at Amaravati. It, like many synoptic narratives, can be difficult to interpret. The medallion is meant to present the reader with the story of Buddha's previous birth as the elephant Chaddanta. The center of the medallion has only decorative carving, which is a visual cue on how the medallion is meant to be interpreted; which is in a circular pattern. Other than that subtle visual cue the artist leaves very little indication of the order.

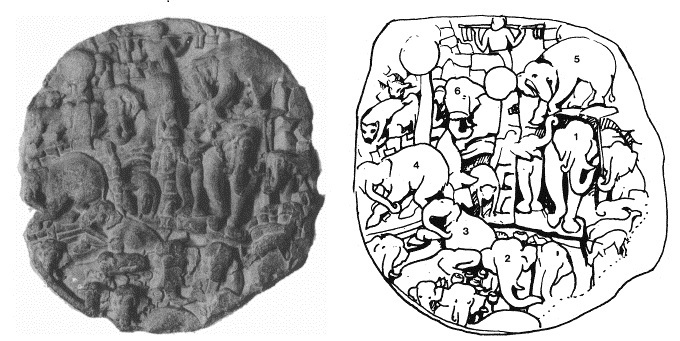
Illustrates how the medallion is meant to be read.

The medallion can be separated into 3 episodes:

- 1 - Chaddanta presents his chief queen with lotus.
- 2 - The Junior queen is offended.
- 3 – She, the junior queen, leaves to be on her own.
- 4 – She lays dying, hoping for revenge.
- 5 – A hunter aims an arrow at Chaddanta.
- 6 – The hunter saws off Chaddanta's tusks.
- 7- The hunter is seen departing with the tusks. (This isn't numbered but is at the very top center)

== Panoramic narrative ==
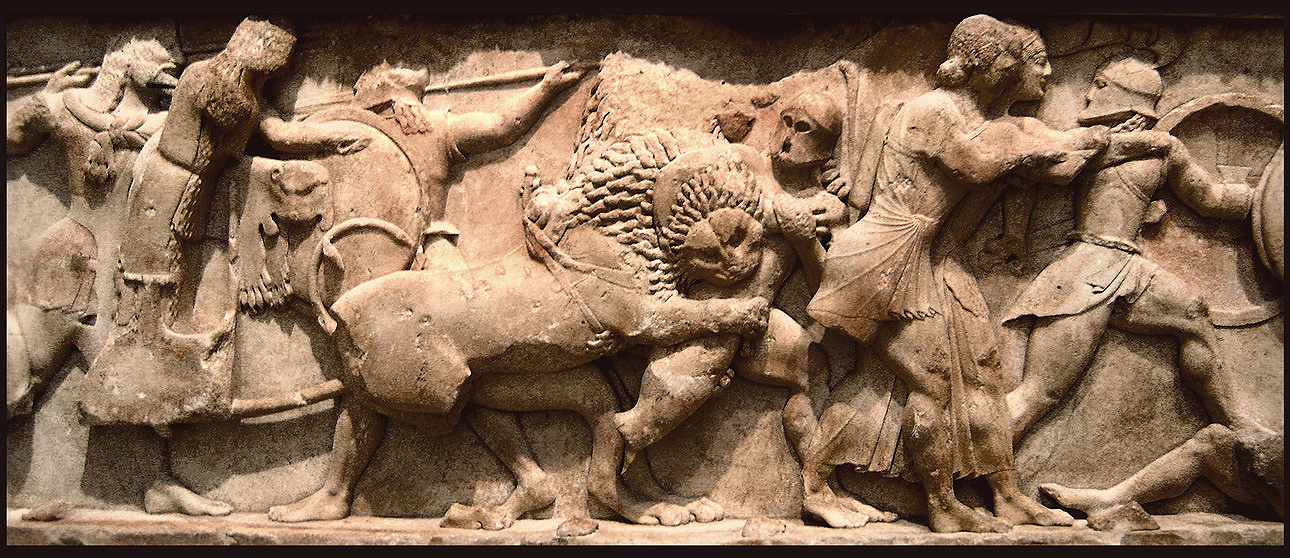
Detail of the north frieze of the Siphnian Treasury at Delphi

A panoramic (or panoptic) narrative is a narrative that depicts multiple scenes and actions without the repetition of characters. Actions may be in a sequence or represent simultaneous actions during an event.

=== Siphnian Treasury North Frieze ===
The Siphnian Treasury at Delphi has four marble friezes, one for each cardinal direction. These four friezes depict panoramic narratives through the use of carvings of the marble. The north frieze is an illustration of a battle between the Olympic gods and the giants. In the far left two giants attack Zeus in his chariot, who is no longer visible due to deterioration. Hera is seen finishing off a giant to the right of Zeus with Athena behind her (further right) fighting two giants. To the right of Athena is her brother Ares who is fighting two other giants with one already dead at his feet. There are multiple narratives taking place with each combatant in varying scenes. The dead giant at Ares' feet was downed by Athena but Ares is depicted as moving forward in the narrative by stepping over the corpse.

== Progressive narrative ==
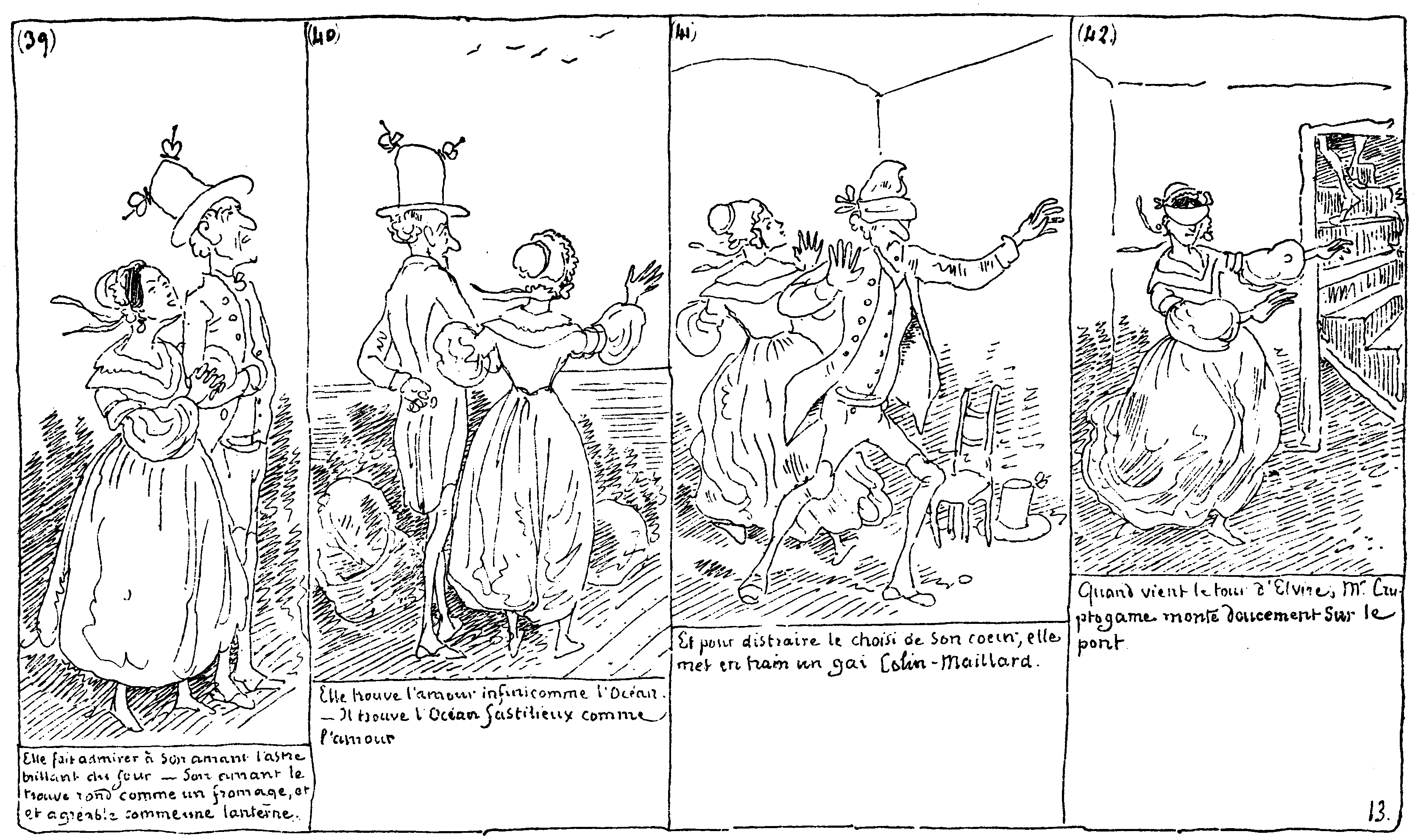
A page by Rodolphe Töpffer

A progressive narrative portrays a single scene in which characters do not repeat. However, multiple actions are taking place in order to convey a passing of time in the narrative. A progressive narrative is not to be interpreted as a group of simultaneous events but rather a sequence that is dependent on its location. Actions displayed by characters in the narratives compact present and future action into a single image.

== Sequential narrative ==
A sequential narrative is very much like a continuous narrative with one major difference. A sequential narrative focuses on enframement to develop temporal progression. Each scene and action is represented within its frame as a unit. Each frame is a particular scene during a particular moment. A sequential narrative is the type of narrative generally used in comics.

== See also ==
- Painting
- Visual arts
- Abstract art
- Lucas Museum of Narrative Art
