= Jupiter and Callisto (Boucher, 1744) =

Painting by François Boucher

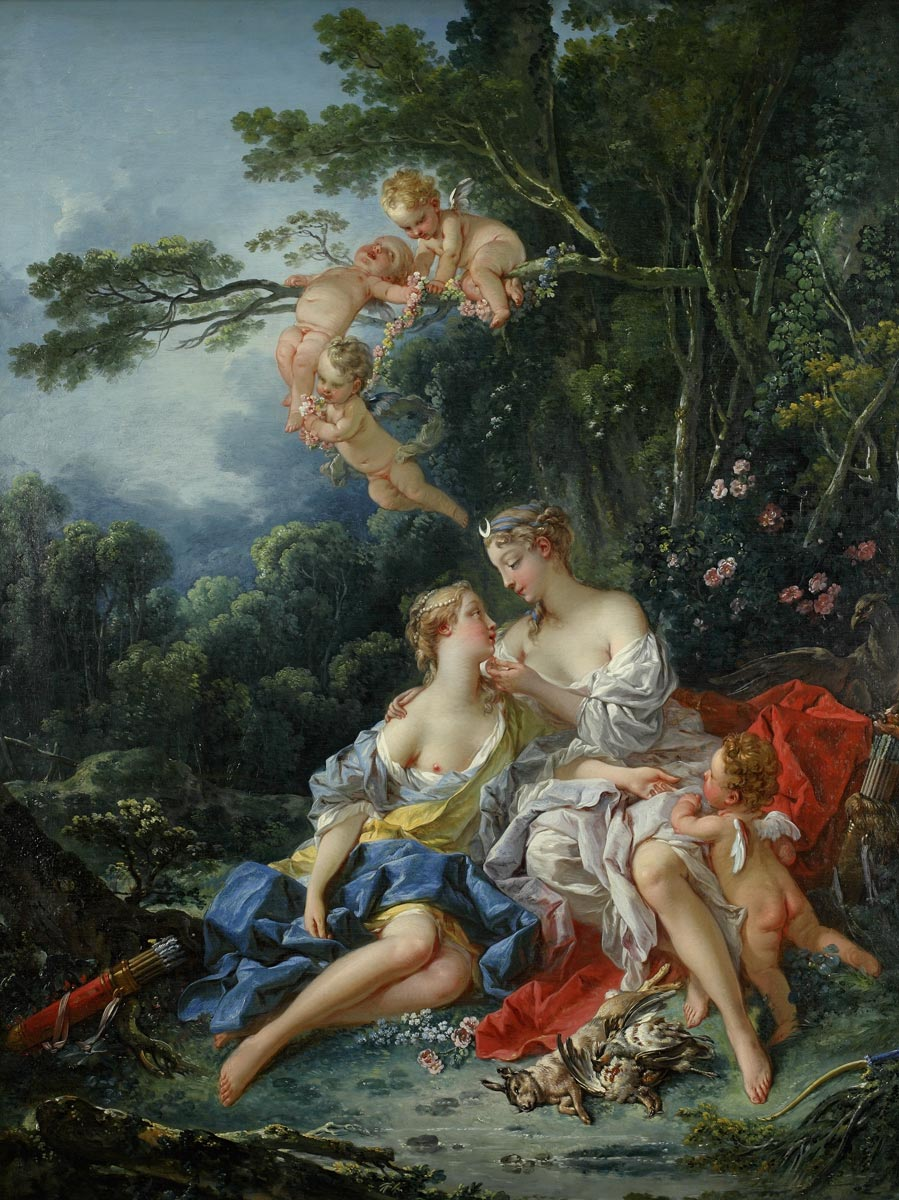
- Artist: François Boucher
- Year: 1744
- Medium: oil on canvas
- Dimensions: 98 cm × 72 cm (39 in × 28 in)
- Location: Pushkin Museum, Moscow

Jupiter and Callisto is a 1744 oil-on-canvas painting by the French artist François Boucher, now in the Pushkin Museum in Moscow. It shows Jupiter disguised as Diana to seduce Callisto.

== Mythological theme ==
Jupiter, who is in love with Callisto, takes on the appearance of Diana to seduce her. The painting depicts the flirtation between Jupiter, under the disguise of the goddess of the hunt, and her favorite nymph.
