= Autolaus =

Ancient Greek mythological figure

In Greek mythology, Autolaus (Ancient Greek: Αὐτόλαος) was the illegitimate son of King Arcas of Arcadia. He found and brought up the infant god Asclepius when the infant was exposed in Thelpusa.
