= 204 Kallisto =

Main-belt asteroid

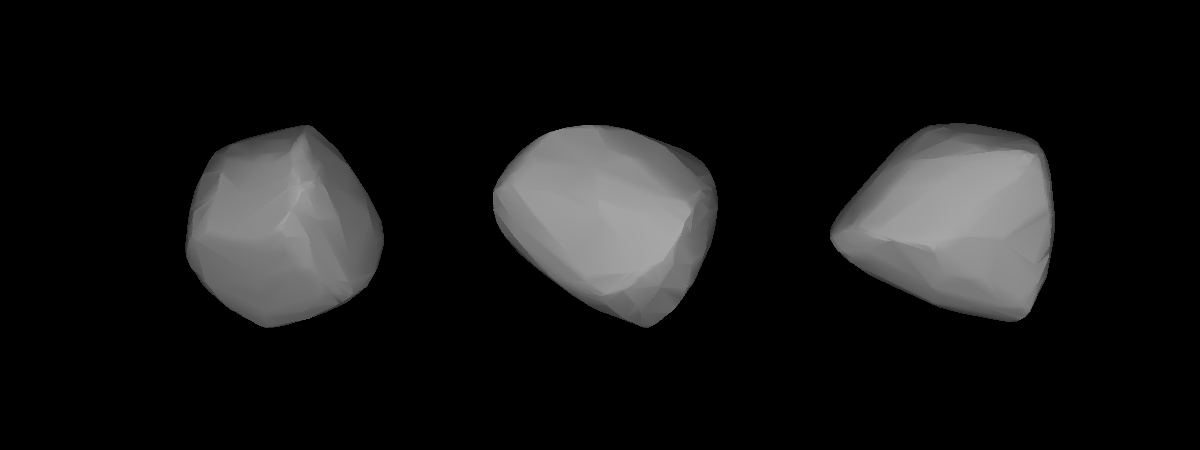
- Lightcurve-based 3D model of 204 Kallisto

Discovery
- Discovered by: Johann Palisa
- Discovery date: 8 October 1879

Designations
- Pronunciation: /kəˈlɪstoʊ/
- Named after: Callisto
- Alternative designations: A879 TA
- Minor planet category: Main belt
- Adjectives: Kallistoan /kælɪˈstoʊən/

Orbital characteristics
- Epoch 31 July 2016 (JD 2457600.5)
- Uncertainty parameter 0
- Observation arc: 136.52 yr (49863 d)
- Aphelion: 3.13704 AU (469.295 Gm)
- Perihelion: 2.20244 AU (329.480 Gm)
- Semi-major axis: 2.66974 AU (399.387 Gm)
- Eccentricity: 0.17504
- Orbital period (sidereal): 4.36 yr (1593.3 d)
- Average orbital speed: 18.22 km/s
- Mean anomaly: 230.567°
- Mean motion: 0° 13^{m} 33.398^{s} / day
- Inclination: 8.28673°
- Longitude of ascending node: 205.123°
- Argument of perihelion: 55.4125°

Physical characteristics
- Dimensions: 48.57±1.2 km 50.36 ± 1.69 km (composite estimate)
- Mass: (3.3±1.5)×10^{17} kg (Note: Calculated from its standard gravitational parameter GM = 0.022±0.010 km^{3}/s^{2}.)
- Mean density: 5.45 g/cm^{3} (Note: Assuming a diameter of 48.6 km.)
- Synodic rotation period: 19.489 h (0.8120 d)
- Geometric albedo: 0.2082±0.010
- Spectral type: S
- Absolute magnitude (H): 8.89

204 Kallisto is a fairly typical, although sizeable Main belt asteroid. It is classified as an S-type asteroid. Like other asteroids of its type, it is light in colour. It was discovered by Johann Palisa on 8 October 1879, in Pola, and was named after the same nymph Callisto in Greek mythology as Jupiter's moon Callisto.

Photometric measurements during 2009 produced a lightcurve that indicated a sidereal rotation period of 19.489±0.002 h with a variation amplitude of 0.18±0.02 magnitudes. This result conflicted with previous determinations of the period, so the latter were ruled out.
