= Megisto (mythology) =

Arcadian mythological princess

In Greek mythology, Megisto (Ancient Greek: Μεγιστώ, romanized: Megistṓ, lit. 'the greatest') is, in some accounts, another form for Callisto, the mother of Arcas by Zeus. She was also called Themisto, daughter of Inachus.

== Family ==
Megisto was of royal blood due to her father being Ceteus, son of King Lycaon of Arcadia.

== Mythology ==
Like Callisto, Megisto suffered the fate of being transformed into a bear. Her father, Ceteus, is represented in the sky as the Kneeler as he seems to be kneeling on one knee, lamenting his daughter's fate and holding up outstretched hands to heaven, asking for the gods to restore her to him.
