= Diomeneia =

In Greek mythology, Diomeneia (Ancient Greek: Διομένεια) was an Arcadian princess as the daughter of King Arcas. According to Pausanias bronze portrait-statue of a woman said to be Diomeneia existed in a Mantineian market place.
