= Galeus (mythology) =

Galeus (Ancient Greek: Γάλεος, romanized: Galeos, lit. 'the lizard') was a figure in ancient Greek mythology, the son of Apollo and Themisto (the daughter of Zabius, the king of the Hyperboreans).

== Mythology ==
Following the advice from the oracle of Zeus at Dodona, Galeus emigrated to Sicily, where he established a sanctuary dedicated to his father, Apollo. This act played a significant role in the founding of the Galeotae (Γαλεῶται), a family of soothsayers in Sicily. The Galeotae traced their origins back to Galeus, and their principal seat was the town of Hybla, which became known as Galeotis (γαλεῶτις) or Geleatis (γελεᾶτις) as Thucydides writes it.
