= Ceteus =

In Greek mythology, Ceteus (Ancient Greek: Κητεύς, romanized: Kêteus, lit. 'of the ravines' from kêtôeis') may refer to the following two characters:

- Ceteus, an Arcadian prince as one of the 50 sons of the impious King Lycaon either by the naiad Cyllene, Nonacris or by unknown woman. In one version of the myth, he was called the son of Parthaon (son of Dorieus) and brother of Paros. Ceteus was said to be the father of Callisto or Megisto, both were called the mother of Arcas. In one account, Callisto's mother was called Stilbe. Ceteus was called the Kneeler among the stars. These events have taken place on the Arcadian mountain of Nonacris.
- Ceteus, one of the commanders of the Lamian Centaurs who joined Dionysus in his campaign against India.
