= Diana and Callisto (Rubens) =

Painting by Peter Paul Rubens

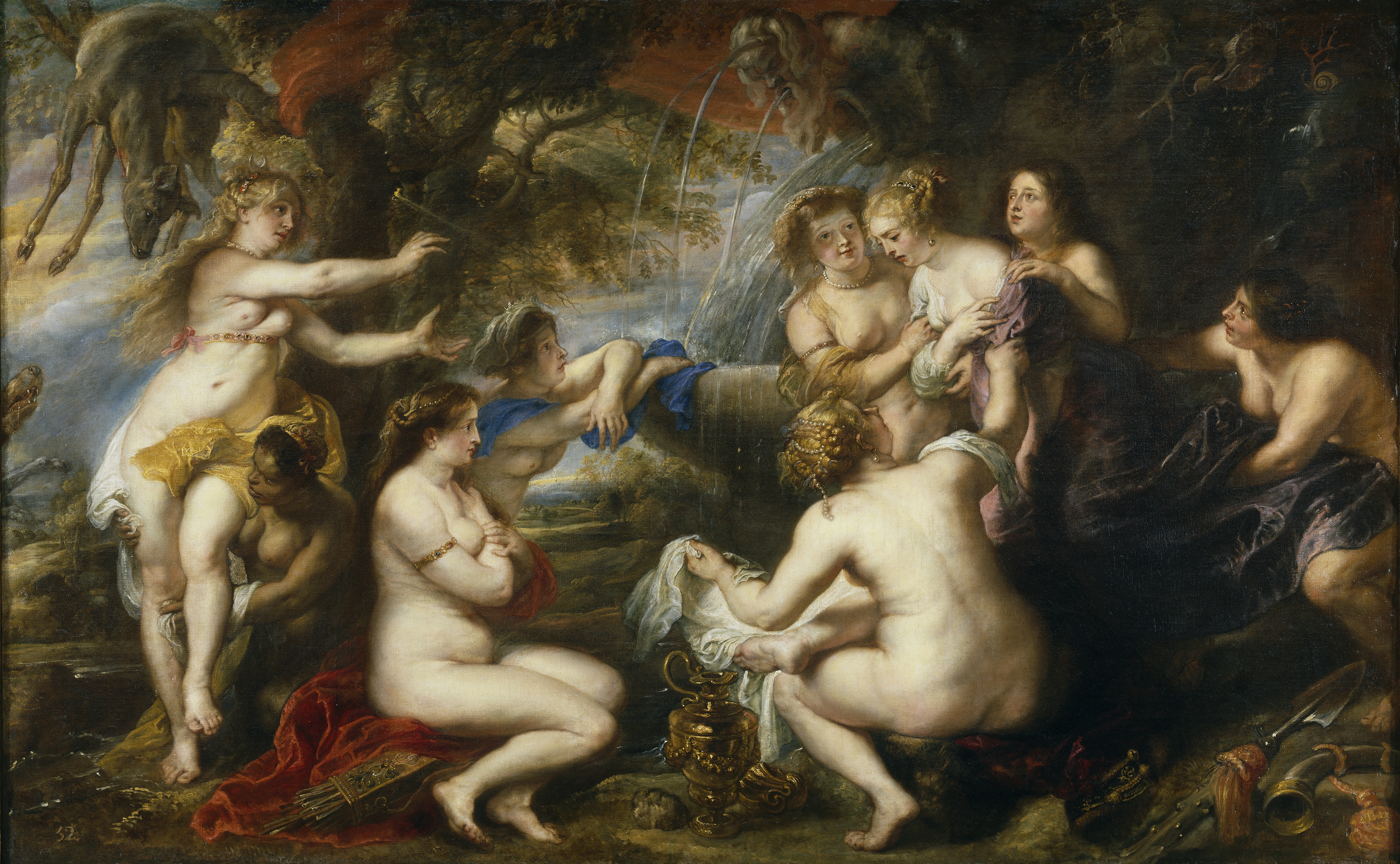
Diana and Callisto (1637-1638) by Rubens

Diana and Callisto is a painting produced by Peter Paul Rubens between 1637 and 1638. It was one of a number of paintings commissioned from the artist by Philip IV of Spain for his new hunting lodge, the Torre de la Parada. It measures 202 by 303 centimetres (80 in × 119 in) and is now in the Museo del Prado, in Madrid. It depicts Diana and Callisto.
