= Themistocles (disambiguation) =

Themistocles was an Athenian soldier and statesman.

Themistocles or Themistoklis may also refer to:

== People ==
- Themistocles Anastasiadis, birth name of Greek journalist Themos Anastasiadis (born 1958)
- Themistokles Cholevas (1926–2007), Greek basketball player
- Themistoklis Diakidis (1882–1944), Greek high jumper
- Themistocles Leftheris (born 1982), American pair skater
- Themistoklis Nikolaidis, birth name of Greek footballer Demis Nikolaidis (born 1973)
- Themistocles M. Rassias (born 1951), Greek mathematician
- Themistokles Rigas (1945-1984), Greek footballer
- Themistoklis Sophoulis (1860–1949), Greek politician
- Saint Themistocles the Martyr of Myra in Lycia, 3rd-century saint
- Sir Themistocles Zammit (1864–1935), Maltese archaeologist, historian, professor of chemistry, medical doctor, researcher and writer

== Ships ==
- SS Themistocles (1907), a ship launched as Moraitis in 1907 and renamed Themistocles in 1908
- SS Themistocles (1911), a ship launched in 1910 and completed in 1911.

== Other uses ==
- The Decree of Themistocles, ancient Greek inscription, purported to have been issued under the guidance of Themistocles
