= Arcas =

Greek mythological king of Arcadia

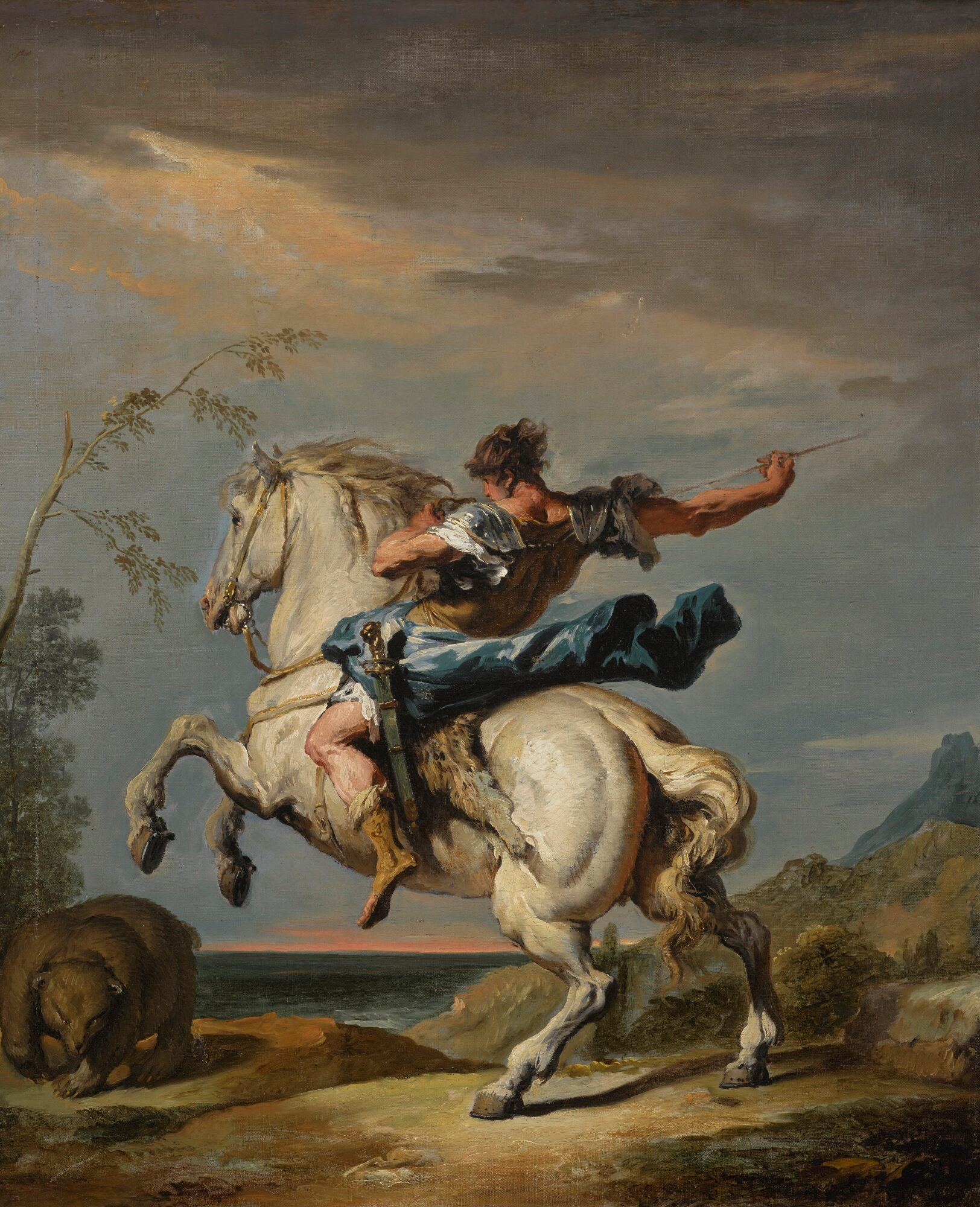
Arcas and Callisto, Sebastiano Ricci (1659–1734).

In Greek mythology, Arcas (/ˈɑːrkəs/; Ancient Greek: Ἀρκάς) was a hunter who became king of Arcadia. He was remembered for having taught people the arts of weaving and baking bread and for spreading agriculture to Arcadia.

== Family ==
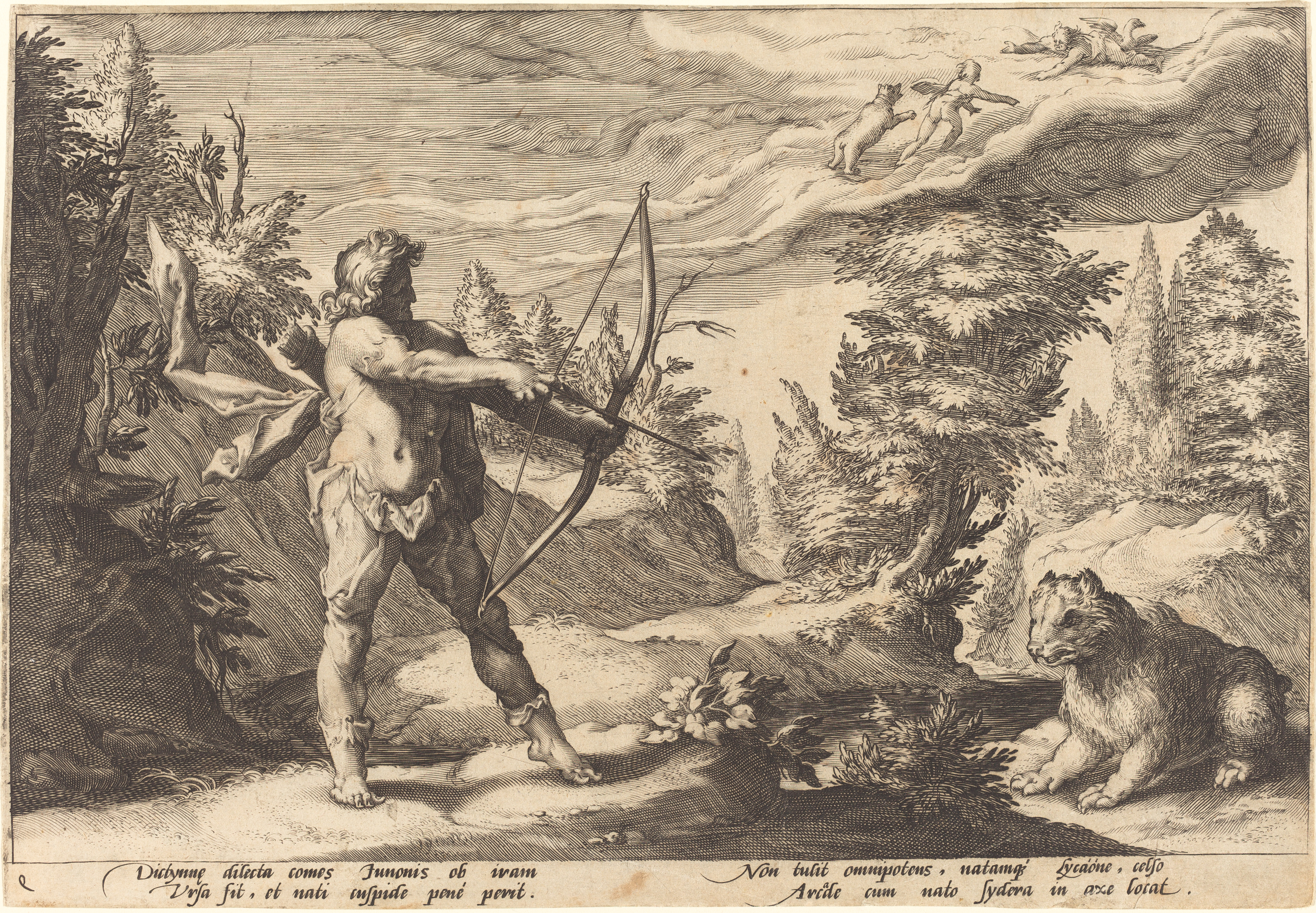
Arcas Preparing to Kill His Mother, by Hendrick Goltzius

Arcas was the son of Zeus and Callisto. In other accounts, his birth mother was called Megisto, daughter of Ceteus, son of Lycaon, or else Themisto, daughter of Inachus. In one rare account, Orchomenus was called the father of Arcas.

Arcas was married to either Laodamia (Leaneira), daughter of Amyclas of Sparta; Meganeira, daughter of Crocon; the nymph Chrysopeleia; or the Dryad Erato. He also left a number of children, including the sons Azan, Apheidas, Elatus, and Triphylus, an illegitimate son Autolaus and at least two daughters, Hyperippe and Diomeneia. Arcas's other sons were Erymanthus and Pelasgus.

Comparative table of Arcas's family
Relation	Names	Sources			
Relation	Names	Apollodorus's Bibliotheca	Pausanias's Description of Greece		
Parents	Callisto and Zeus	✓	✓		
Wife	Leanira	✓			
Wife	Meganira	✓			
Wife	Chrysopelia	✓			
Wife	Erato		✓		
Wife	Laodameia			✓	
Wife	Unknown				✓
Children	Elatus	✓	✓		
Children	Apheidas	✓	✓		
Children	Azan		✓		
Children	Triphylus			✓	
Children	Pelasgus				✓
Children	Hyperippe				✓
Children	Diomeneia				✓
Children	Erymanthus				✓
Children	Autolaus				✓

== Mythology ==
Callisto was a nymph in the retinue of the goddess Artemis, or in some sources the daughter of King Lycaon. As she would not be with anyone but Artemis, Zeus cunningly disguised himself as Artemis and raped Callisto. The child resulting from their union was called Arcas.

Hera became jealous, and in anger, she transformed Callisto into a bear. She would have done the same or worse to her son, but Zeus hid Arcas in an area of Greece, which would come to be called Arcadia, in his honor. Arcas was given into a care of one of the Pleiades, Maia. There, Arcas safely lived until one day, during one of the court feasts held by king Lycaon (Arcas's maternal grandfather), Arcas was placed upon the burning altar as a sacrifice to the gods. He then said to Zeus, "If you think that you are so clever, make your son whole and un-harmed". Zeus became enraged and made Arcas whole and directed his anger toward Lycaon, turning him into the first werewolf.

Then, Arcas became the new king of Arcadia and the country's greatest hunter. One day, when Arcas went hunting in the woods, he came across his mother. Seeing her son after so long, she went forth to embrace him. Not knowing that the bear was his mother, he went to kill her with an arrow. In one version of the story, Arcas hunted Callisto because she had entered the forbidden sanctuary of Zeus on Mt. Lykaion. Zeus however, watching over them, stopped Arcas from shooting Callisto and raised them into the heavens as constellations (Boötes and Ursa Major). When Hera heard of that, she became so angry that she asked Tethys to keep them in a certain place so that the constellations would never sink below the horizon and receive water. Arcas's bones were brought from Mount Maenalos to an altar of Hera in Mantinea according to the instructions of the Delphic Oracle.
