= Themisto (mythology) =

In Greek mythology, Themisto (/θəˈmɪstoʊ/; Ancient Greek: Θεμιστώ, romanized: Themistṓ, lit. 'belonging to the law or customs') may refer to the following women:

- Themisto, one of the 50 Nereids, marine-nymph daughter of the sea divinities Nereus and the Oceanid Doris.
- Themisto, daughter of the river god Inachus and the mother of Arcas by Zeus.
- Themisto, daughter of the Hyperborean king Zabius, mother of Galeos by Apollo.
- Themisto, the third and last wife of Athamas.
