= Callisto (mythology) =

Nymph in Greek mythology

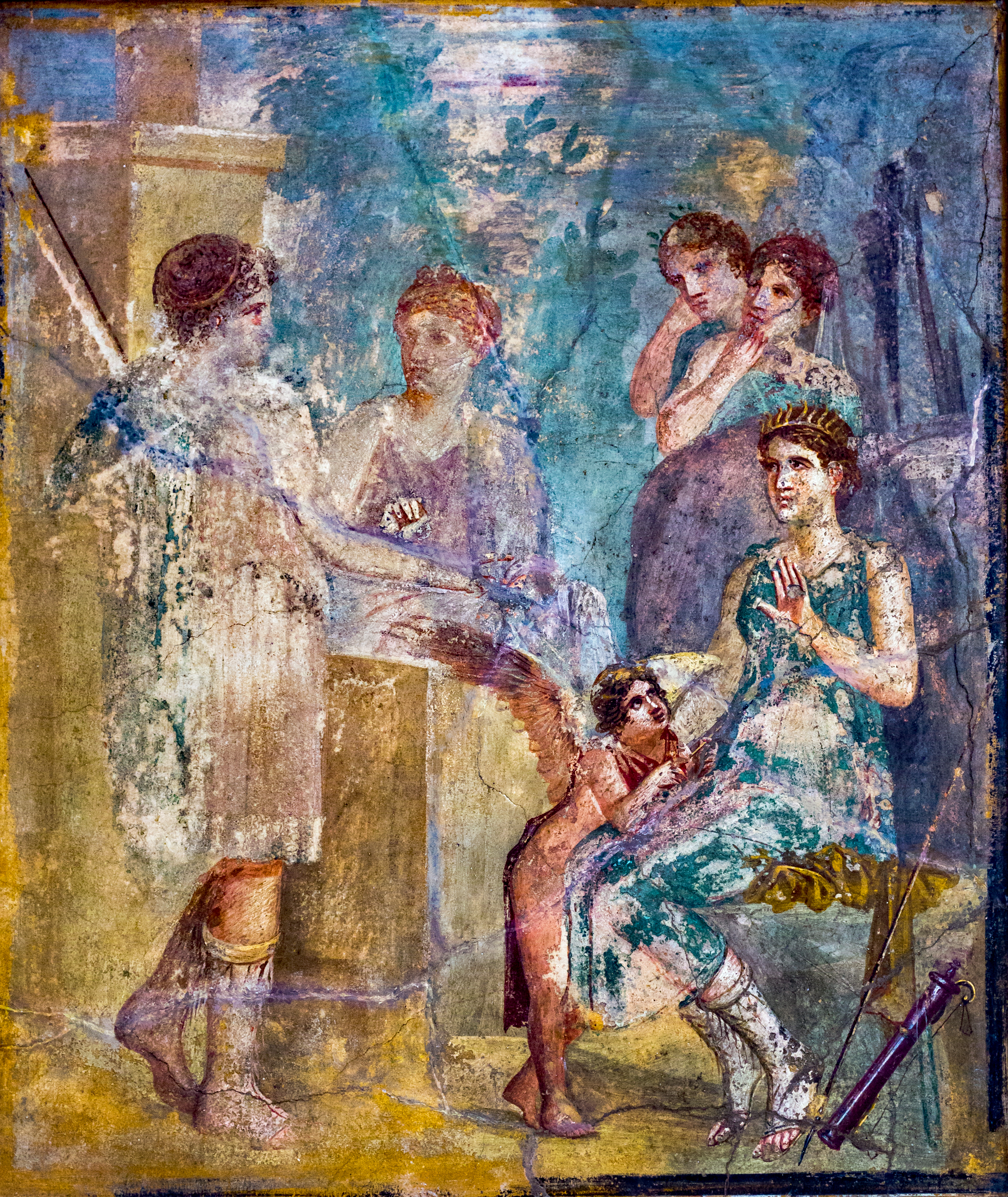
Artemis (seated and wearing a radiate crown), the beautiful nymph Callisto (left), Eros and other nymphs. Antique fresco from Pompeii.

In Greek mythology, Callisto (/kəˈlɪstoʊ/; Ancient Greek: Καλλιστώ, romanized: Kallistṓ, lit. 'most beautiful' Ancient Greek pronunciation: [kallistɔ̌ː]) was a nymph (an Arcadian mountain nymph; an Oread), or the daughter of King Lycaon; the myth varies in such details. She was believed to be one of the followers of Artemis (Diana for the Romans) who was pursued by Zeus. Many versions of Callisto's story survive. According to some writers, Zeus transformed himself into the figure of Artemis to pursue Callisto, and she slept with him believing Zeus to be Artemis.

She became pregnant and when this was eventually discovered, she was expelled from Artemis's group, after which a furious Hera, the wife of Zeus, transformed her into a bear, although in some versions, Artemis is the one to give her an ursine form. Later, just as she was about to be killed by her son when he was hunting, she was set among the stars as Ursa Major ("the Great Bear") by Zeus. She was the bear-mother of the Arcadians, through her son Arcas by Zeus.

In other accounts, the birth mother of Arcas was called Megisto, daughter of Ceteus, son of Lycaon, or else Themisto, daughter of Inachus.

The fourth Galilean moon of Jupiter and a main belt asteroid are named after Callisto.

== Mythology ==
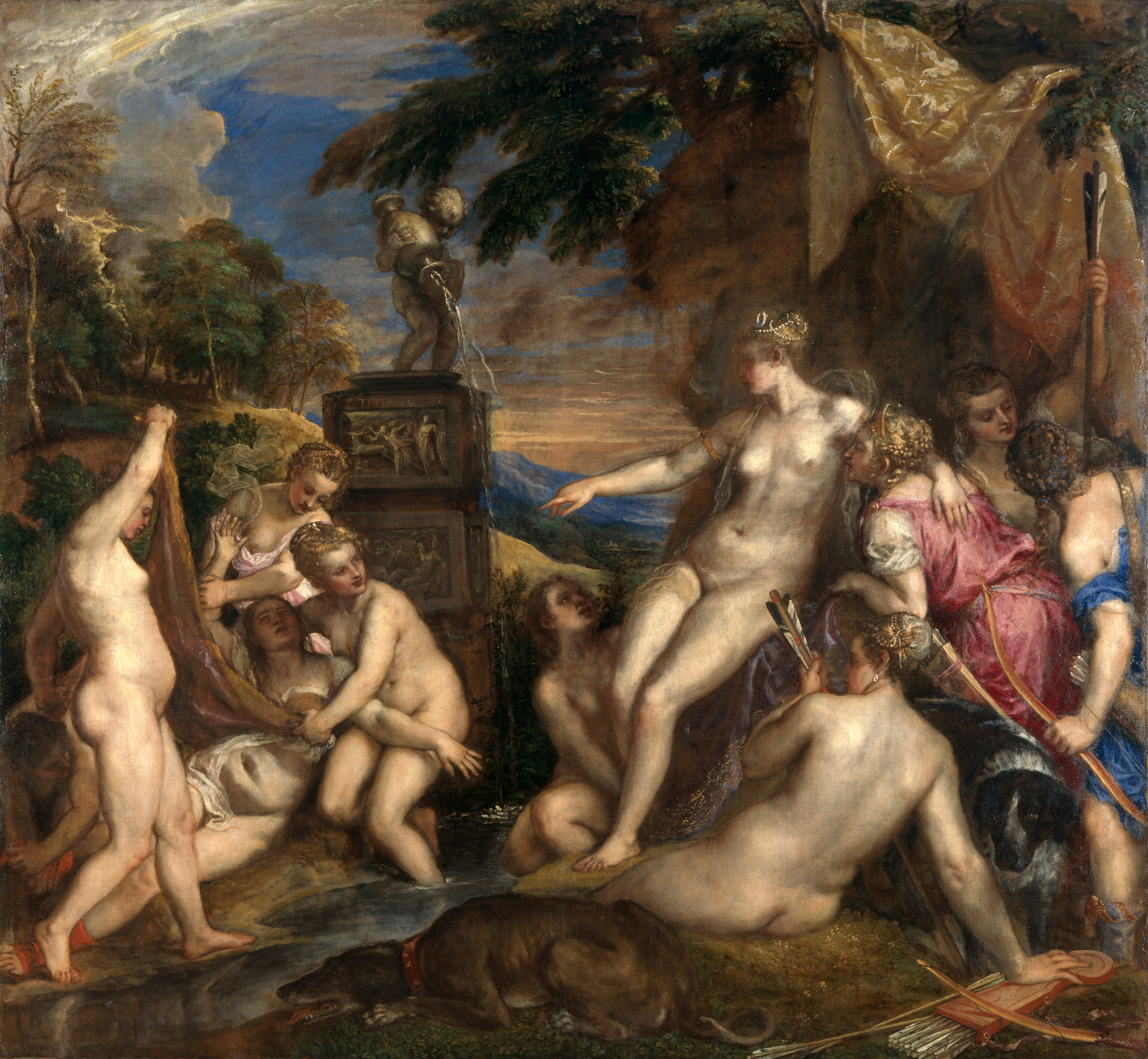
Titian's Diana and Callisto (1559) portrays the moment when Callisto's pregnancy is discovered.

As a follower of Artemis, Callisto, who Hesiod said was the daughter of Lycaon, king of Arcadia, took a vow to remain a virgin, as did all the nymphs of Artemis.

According to Hesiod, she was seduced by Zeus, and of the consequences that followed:

[Callisto] chose to occupy herself with wild-beasts in the mountains together with Artemis, and, when she was seduced by Zeus, continued some time undetected by the goddess, but afterwards, when she was already with child, was seen by her bathing and so discovered. Upon this, the goddess was enraged and changed her into a beast. Thus she became a bear and gave birth to a son called Arcas. But while she was in the mountains, she was hunted by some goat-herds and given up with her babe to Lycaon. Some while after, she thought fit to go into the forbidden precinct of Zeus, not knowing the law, and being pursued by her own son and the Arcadians, was about to be killed because of the said law; but Zeus delivered her because of her connection with him and put her among the stars, giving her the name Bear because of the misfortune which had befallen her.

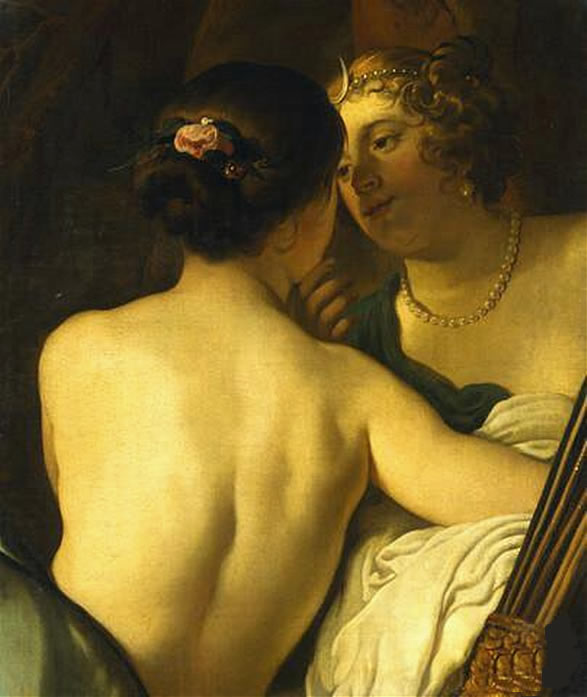
Jupiter in the Guise of Diana Seducing Callisto, Jacob Adriaensz Backer, oil on canvas

Eratosthenes also mentions a variation in which the virginal companion of Artemis that was seduced by Zeus and eventually transformed into the constellation Ursa Minor was named Phoenice instead.

According to Ovid, it was Jupiter who took the form of Diana so that he might evade his wife Juno's detection, forcing himself upon Callisto while she was separated from Diana and the other nymphs. Callisto recognized that something was wrong the moment Jupiter started giving her "non-virginal kisses", but by that point it was too late, and even though she fought him off, he overpowered her. The real Diana arrived in the scene soon after and called Callisto to her, only for the girl to run away in fear she was Jupiter, until she noticed the nymphs accompanying the goddess. Callisto's subsequent pregnancy was discovered several months later while she was bathing with Diana and her fellow nymphs. Diana became enraged when she saw that Callisto was pregnant and expelled her from the group. Callisto later gave birth to Arcas. Juno then took the opportunity to avenge her wounded pride and transformed the nymph into a bear. Sixteen years later Callisto, still a bear, encountered her son Arcas hunting in the forest. Just as Arcas was about to kill his own mother with his javelin, Jupiter averted the tragedy by placing mother and son amongst the stars as Ursa Major and Minor, respectively. Juno, enraged that her attempt at revenge had been frustrated, appealed to Tethys that the two might never meet her waters, thus providing a poetic explanation for the constellations' circumpolar positions in ancient times.

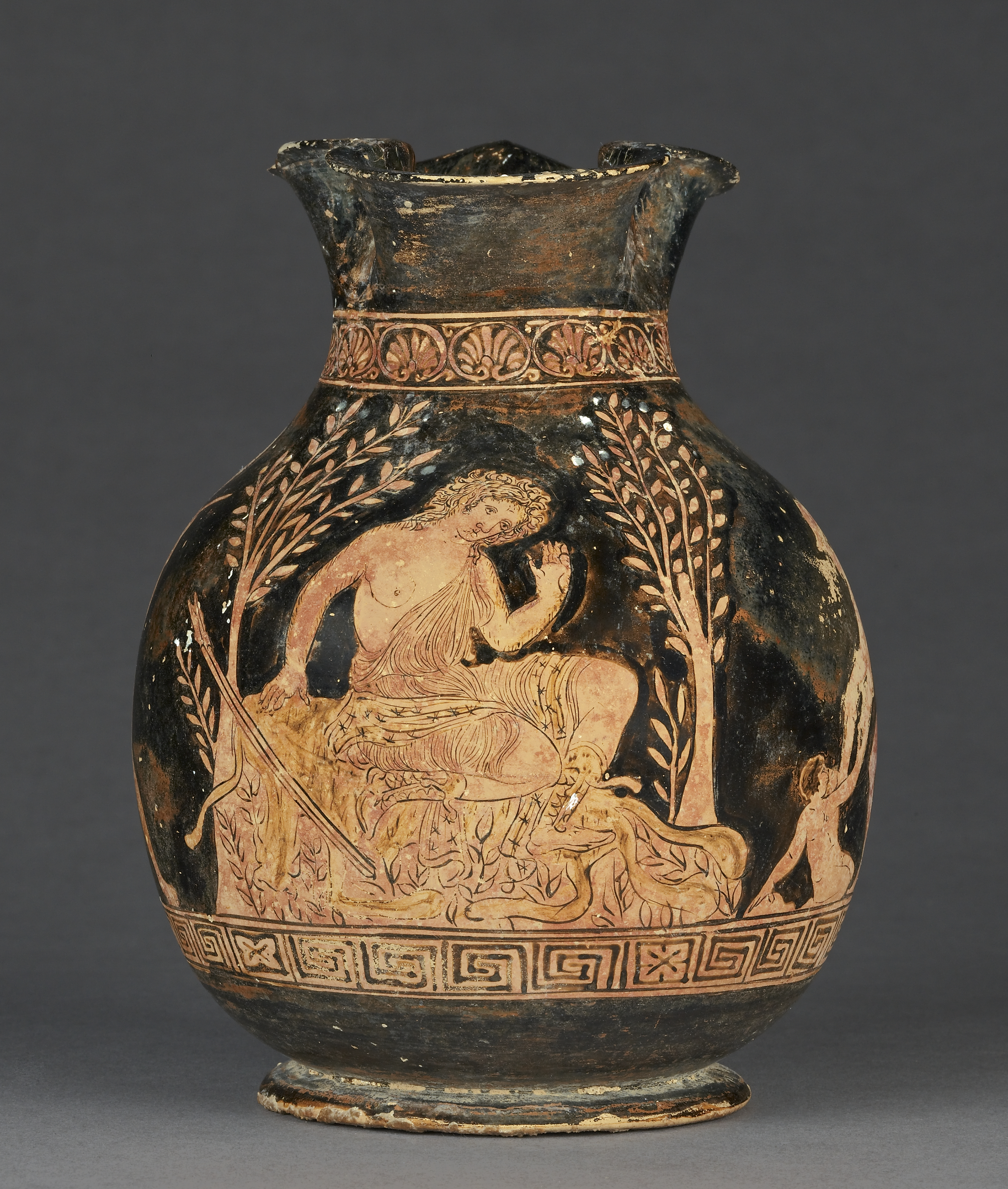
Apulian Red-Figure Chous (Shape 3) with Kallisto Turning into a Bear, about 360 BCE, Terracotta, Attributed to Near the Black Fury Group (Greek (Apulian), active early 300s BCE), J. Paul Getty Museum

According to Hyginus, the origin of the transformation of Zeus, with its lesbian overtones, was from a rendition of the tale in a comedy in a lost work by the Attic comedian Amphis where Zeus embraced Callisto as Artemis and she, after being questioned by Artemis for her pregnancy, blamed the goddess, thinking she had impregnated her; Artemis then changed her into a bear. She was caught by some Aetolians and brought to Lycaon, her father. Still a bear, she rushed with her son Arcas into a temple of Zeus as the Arcadians followed to kill them; Zeus turned mother and son into constellations. Hyginus also records a version where Hera changed Callisto for sleeping with Zeus, and Artemis later slew her while hunting, not recognizing her. In another of the versions Hyginus records, it was Zeus who turned Callisto into a bear, to conceal her from Juno, who had noticed what her husband was doing. Juno then pointed Callisto to Diana, who proceeded to shoot her with her arrows.

According to the mythographer Apollodorus, Zeus forced himself on Callisto when he disguised himself as Artemis or Apollo, in order to lure the sworn maiden into his embrace. Apollodorus is the only author to mention Apollo, but implies that it is not a rarity. Callisto was then turned into a bear by Zeus trying to hide her from Hera, but Hera asked Artemis to shoot the animal, and Artemis complied. Zeus then took the child, named it Arcas, and gave it to Maia to bring up in Arcadia; and Callisto he turned into a star and called it the Bear. Alternatively, Artemis killed Callisto for not protecting her virginity. Nonnus also writes that a "female paramour entered a woman's bed."

Either Artemis "slew Kallisto with a shot of her silver bow," according to Homer, in order to please Juno (Hera) as Pausanias and Pseudo-Apollodorus write or later Arcas, the eponym of Arcadia, nearly killed his bear-mother, when she had wandered into the forbidden precinct of Zeus. In every case, Zeus placed them both in the sky as the constellations Ursa Major, called Arktos (ἄρκτος), the Bear, by Greeks, and Ursa Minor.

According to John Tzetzes, Charon of Lampsacus wrote that Callisto's son Arcas had been fathered not by Zeus but rather by Apollo.

As a constellation, Ursa Major (who was also known as Helice, from an alternative origin story of the constellation) told Demeter, when the goddess asked the stars whether they knew anything about her daughter Persephone's abduction, to ask Helios the sun god, for he knew the deeds of the day well, while the night was blameless.

Comparative table of versions of Callisto's story
Variations	Name	Sources															
Variations	Name	Hom.	Hes.	Amph.	Ovid	Hyginus				Apoll.	Paus.	Stat.	Lib.	Serv.	Non.	Vatican Mythographers	
Variations	Name	Hom.	Hes.	Amph.	Ovid	Fab.	Astr. 1.	Astr. 2.	Astr. 3.	Apoll.	Paus.	Stat.	Lib.	Serv.	Non.	V.M. 1	V.M. 2
Zeus disguised?	No mention		✓			✓	✓	✓	✓		✓					✓	
Zeus disguised?	Yes, as Artemis			✓	✓					✓		✓		✓	✓		✓
Zeus disguised?	Yes, as Apollo									✓							
God who transformed Callisto	Artemis		✓	✓			✓										
God who transformed Callisto	Hera				✓	✓		✓			✓			✓		✓	✓
God who transformed Callisto	Zeus								✓	✓			✓				
Killer of Callisto	Arcas and/or Arcadians		✓	✓	✓												✓
Killer of Callisto	Artemis	✓						✓	✓	✓	✓						

== Origin of the myth ==
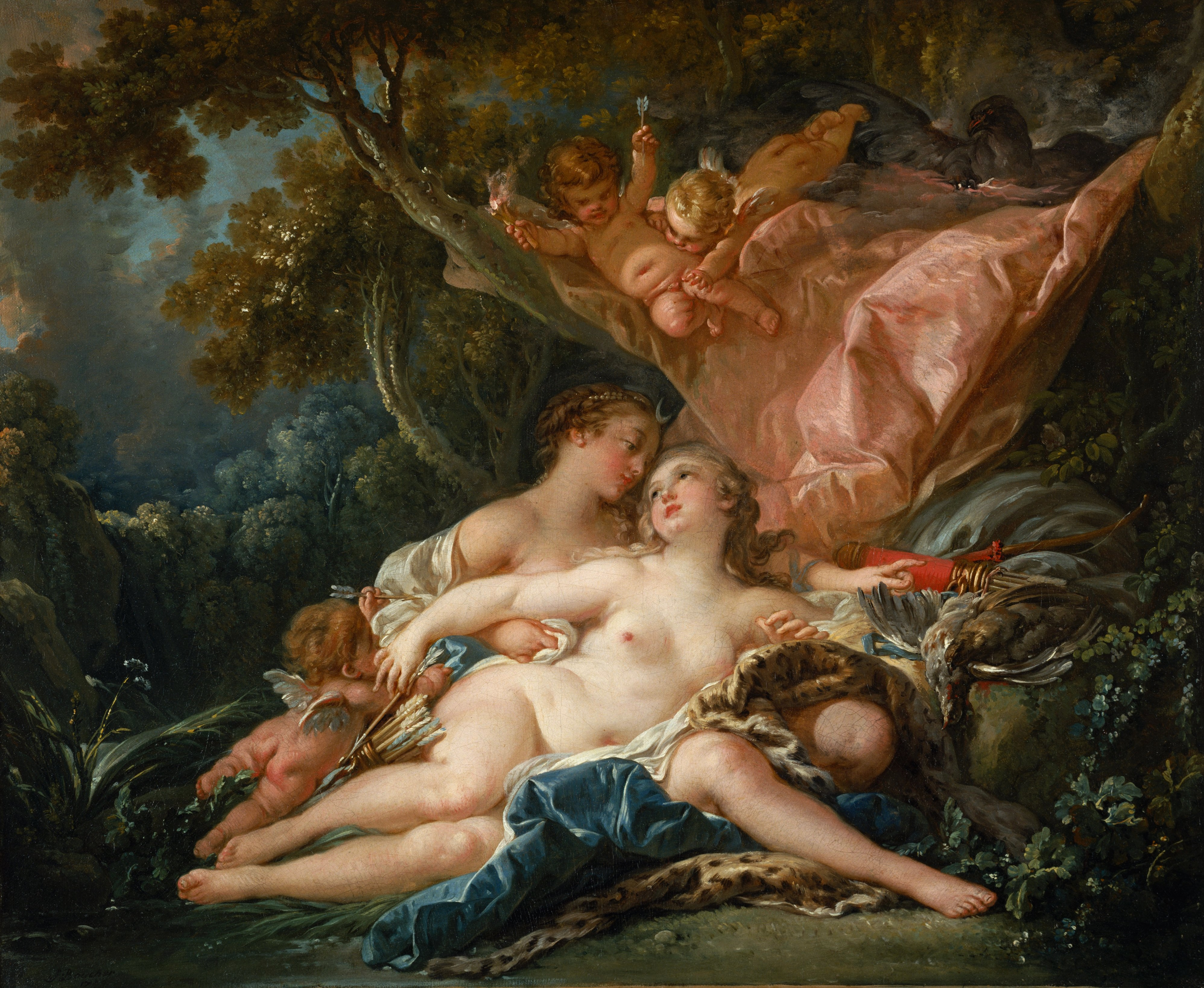
In Jupiter and Callisto by François Boucher, Zeus/Jupiter takes the form of Artemis/Diana (Nelson-Atkins Museum of Art, Kansas City)

The name Kalliste (Καλλίστη), "most beautiful", may be recognized as an epithet of the goddess herself, though none of the inscriptions at Athens that record priests of Artemis Kalliste (Ἄρτεμις Καλλίστη), date before the third century BCE. Artemis Kalliste was worshiped in Athens in a shrine which lay outside the Dipylon gate, by the side of the road to the Academy. W. S. Ferguson suggested that Artemis Soteira and Artemis Kalliste were joined in a common cult administered by a single priest. The bearlike character of Artemis herself was a feature of the Brauronia. It has been suggested that the myths of Artemis' nymphs breaking their vows were originally about Artemis herself, before her characterization shifted to that of a sworn virgin who fiercely defends her chastity.

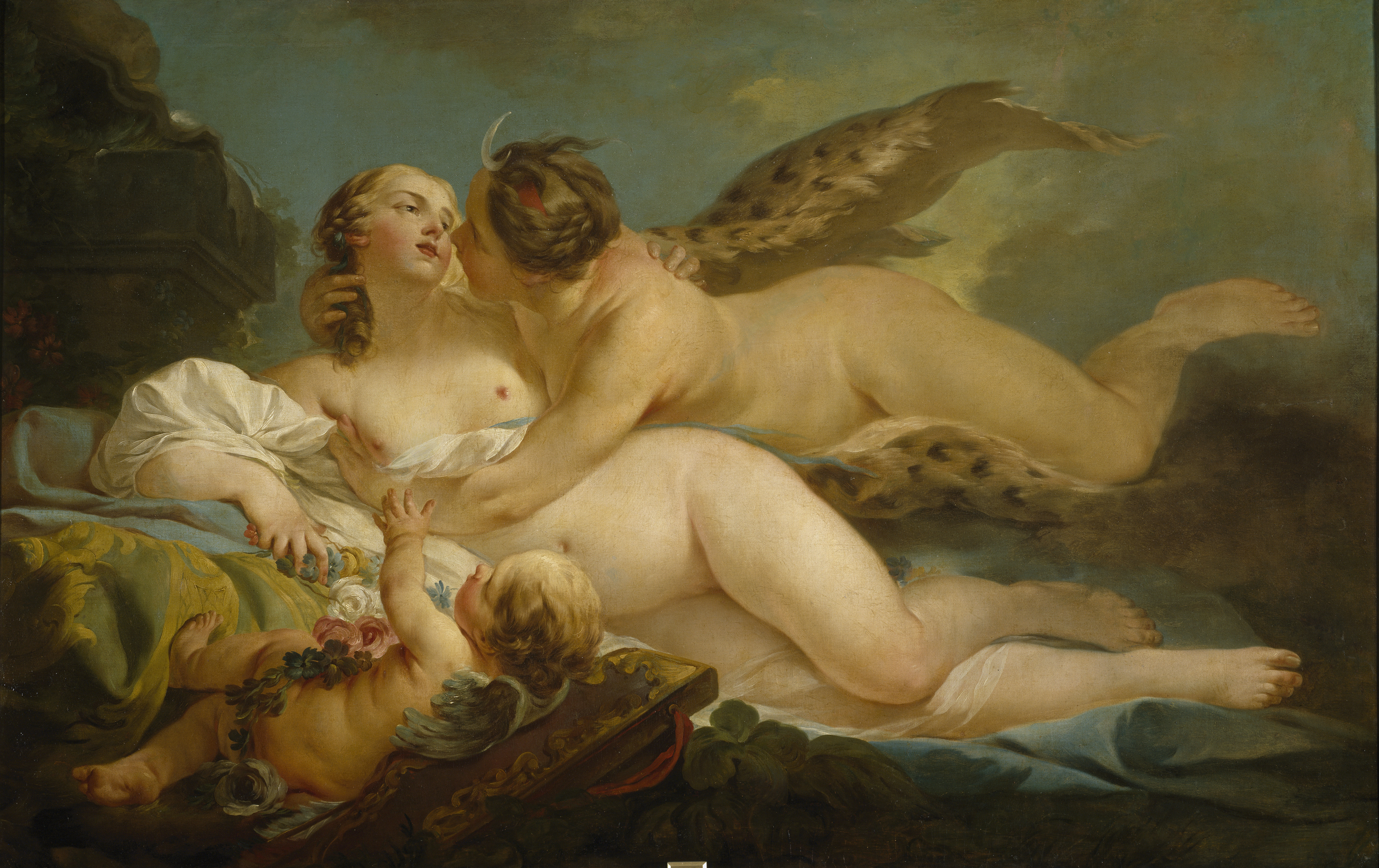
Jupiter seduces Callisto, Jean-Baptiste Marie Pierre, ca. 1745-1749

The myth in Catasterismi may be derived from the fact that a set of constellations appear close together in the sky, in and near the Zodiac sign of Libra, namely Ursa Minor, Ursa Major, Boötes, and Virgo. The constellation Boötes, was explicitly identified in the Hesiodic Astronomia (Ἀστρονομία) as Arcas, the "Bear-warden" (Arktophylax; Ἀρκτοφύλαξ): He is Arkas the son of Kallisto and Zeus, and he lived in the country about Lykaion. After Zeus had seduced Kallisto, Lykaon, pretending not to know of the matter, entertained Zeus, as Hesiod says, and set before him on the table the babe [Arkas] which he had cut up.

The stars of Ursa Major were all circumpolar in Athens of 400 BCE, and all but the stars in the Great Bear's left foot were circumpolar in Ovid's Rome, in the first century CE. Now, however, due to the precession of the equinoxes, the feet of the Great Bear constellation do sink below the horizon from Rome and especially from Athens; however, Ursa Minor (Arcas) does remain completely above the horizon, even from latitudes as far south as Honolulu and Hong Kong.

According to Julien d'Huy, who used phylogenetic and statistical tools, the story could be a recent transformation of a Palaeolithic myth.

== In art ==
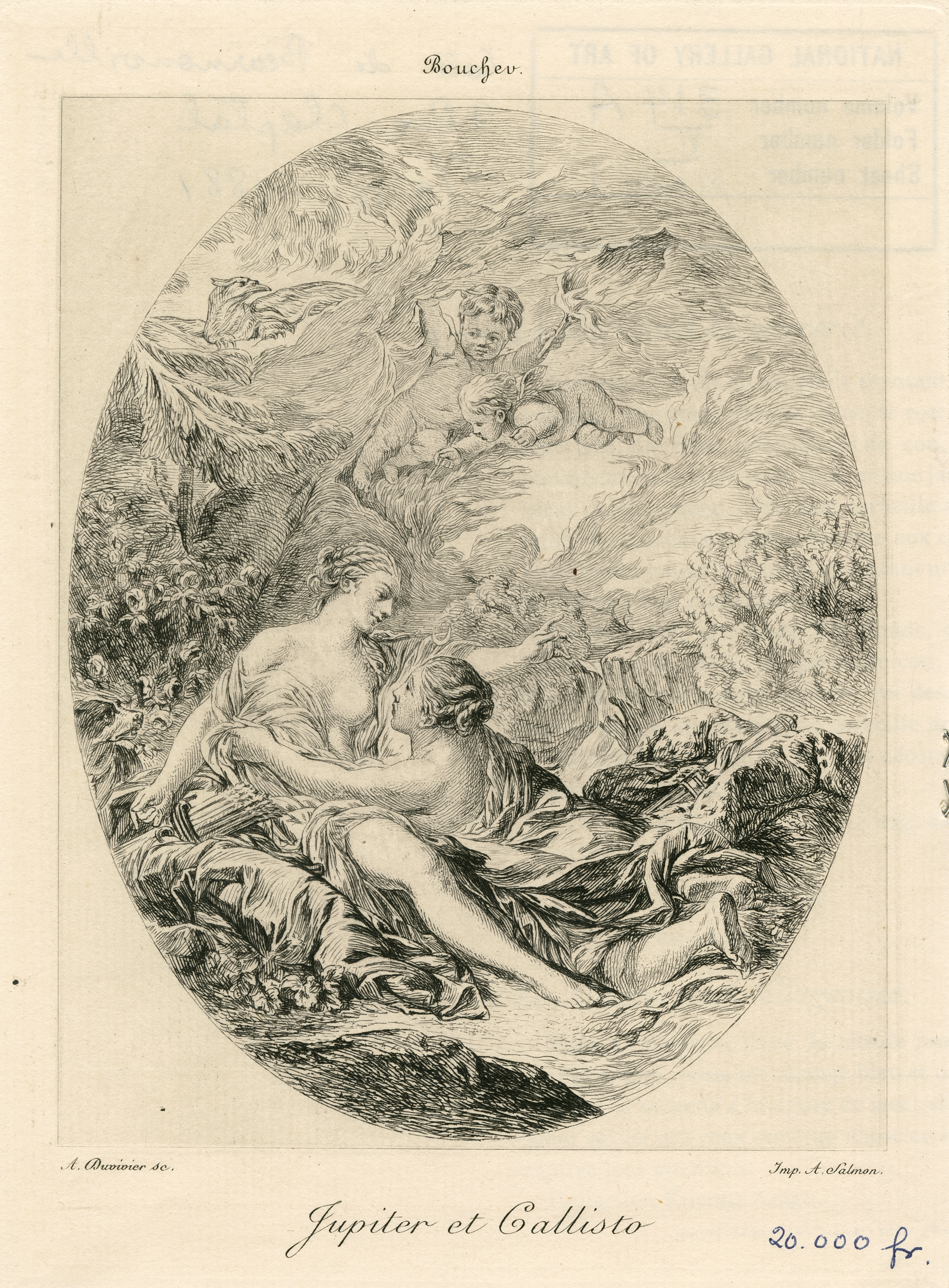
A. Duvivier after François Boucher, "Jupiter and Callisto," 19th century, engraving and etching

Callisto's story was sometimes depicted in classical art, where the moment of transformation into a bear was the most popular. From the Renaissance on a series of major history paintings as well as many smaller cabinet paintings and book illustrations, usually called "Diana and Callisto", depicted the traumatic moment of discovery of the pregnancy, as the goddess and her nymphs bathed in a pool, following Ovid's account. The subject's attraction was undoubtedly mainly the opportunity it offered for a group of several females to be shown largely nude.

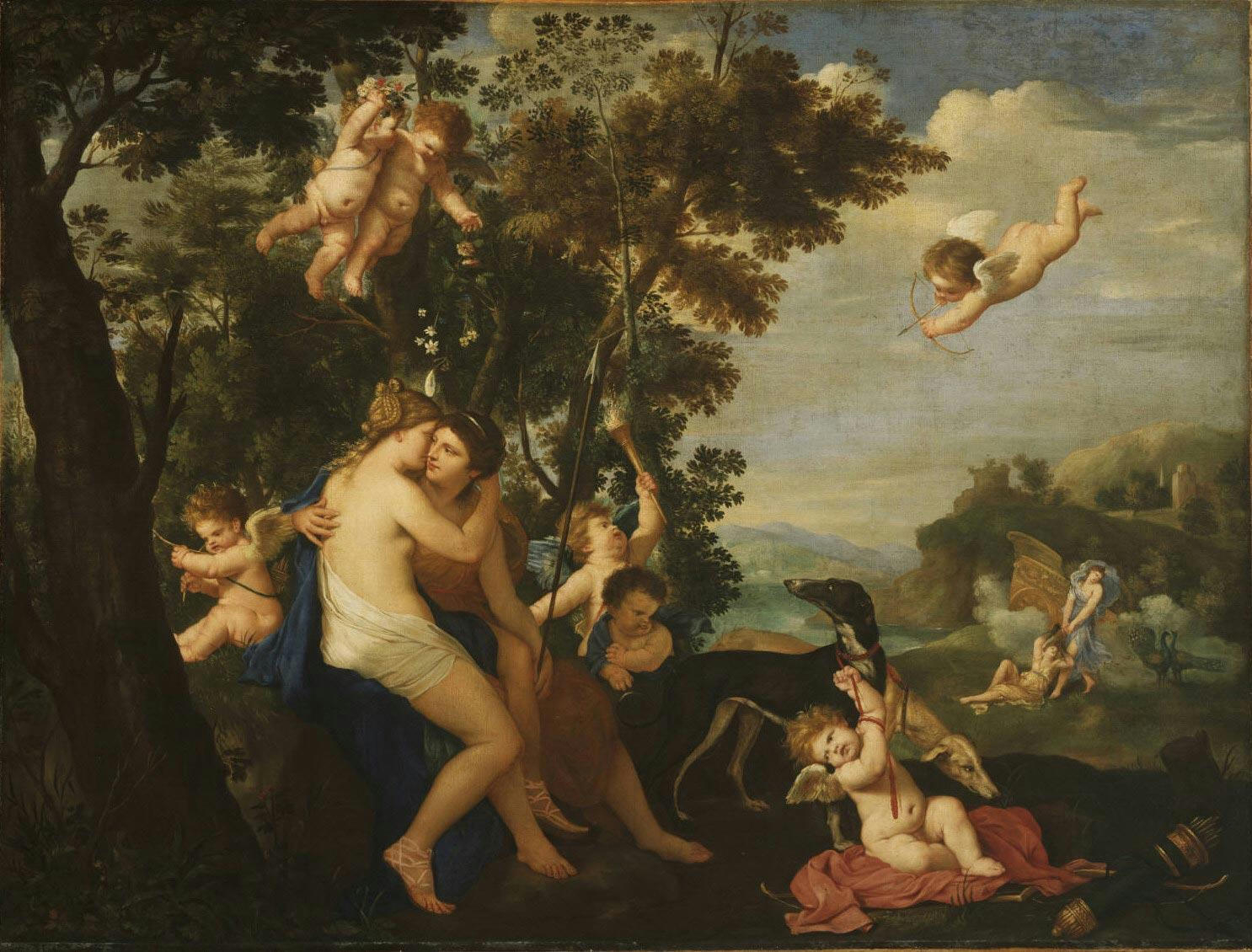
Jupiter and Callisto by Karel Philips Spierincks. In the background Jupiter's jealous wife Juno is dragging Callisto by the hair.

Titian's Diana and Callisto (1556–1559), was the greatest (though not the first) of these, quickly disseminated by a print by Cornelius Cort. Here, as in most subsequent depictions, Diana points angrily, as Callisto is held by two nymphs, who may be pulling off what little clothing remains on her. Other versions include one by Rubens, and Diana Bathing with her Nymphs with Actaeon and Callisto by Rembrandt, which unusually combines the moment with the arrival of Actaeon. The basic composition is rather unusually consistent. Carlo Ridolfi said there was a version by Giorgione, who died in 1510, though his many attributions to Giorgione of paintings that are now lost are treated with suspicion by scholars. Other, less dramatic, treatments before Titian established his composition are by Palma Vecchio and Dosso Dossi. Annibale Carracci's The Loves of the Gods includes an image of Juno urging Diana to shoot Callisto in ursine form.

Although Ovid places the discovery in the ninth month of Callisto's pregnancy, in paintings she is generally shown with a rather modest bump for late pregnancy. With the Visitation in religious art, this was the leading recurring subject in history painting that required showing pregnancy in art, which Early Modern painters still approached with some caution. In any case, the narrative required that the rest of the group had not previously noticed the pregnancy.

Callisto being seduced by Zeus/Jupiter in disguise was also a popular subject, usually called "Jupiter and Callisto"; it was the clearest common subject with lesbian lovers from classical mythology. The two lovers are usually shown happily embracing in a bower. The violence described by Ovid as following Callisto's realization of what is going on is rarely shown. In versions before about 1700 Callisto may show some doubt about what is going on, as in the versions by Rubens. It was especially popular in the 18th century, when depictions were increasingly erotic; François Boucher painted several versions, as did Jean-Honoré Fragonard.

During the Nazi occupation of France, resistance poet Robert Desnos wrote a collection of poems entitled Calixto suivi de contrée, where he used the myth of Callisto as a symbol for beauty imprisoned beneath ugliness: a metaphor for France under the German occupation.

Aeschylus' tragedy Callisto is lost. However, Callisto rejoined the dramatic tradition in the Baroque period when Francesco Cavalli composed La Calisto in 1651.

== Genealogy ==
Genealogy

Zeus	Niobe	Oceanus	Tethys
Arcas	Pelasgus	Meliboea
Lycaon	Nonacris
50 sons of Lycaon	CALLISTO	Zeus
Arcas
Apheidas	Elatus	Azan	Hyperippe	Triphylus	Diomenia	Erymanthus

Colour key:

Male
Female
Deity

== Gallery ==
Callisto in Art

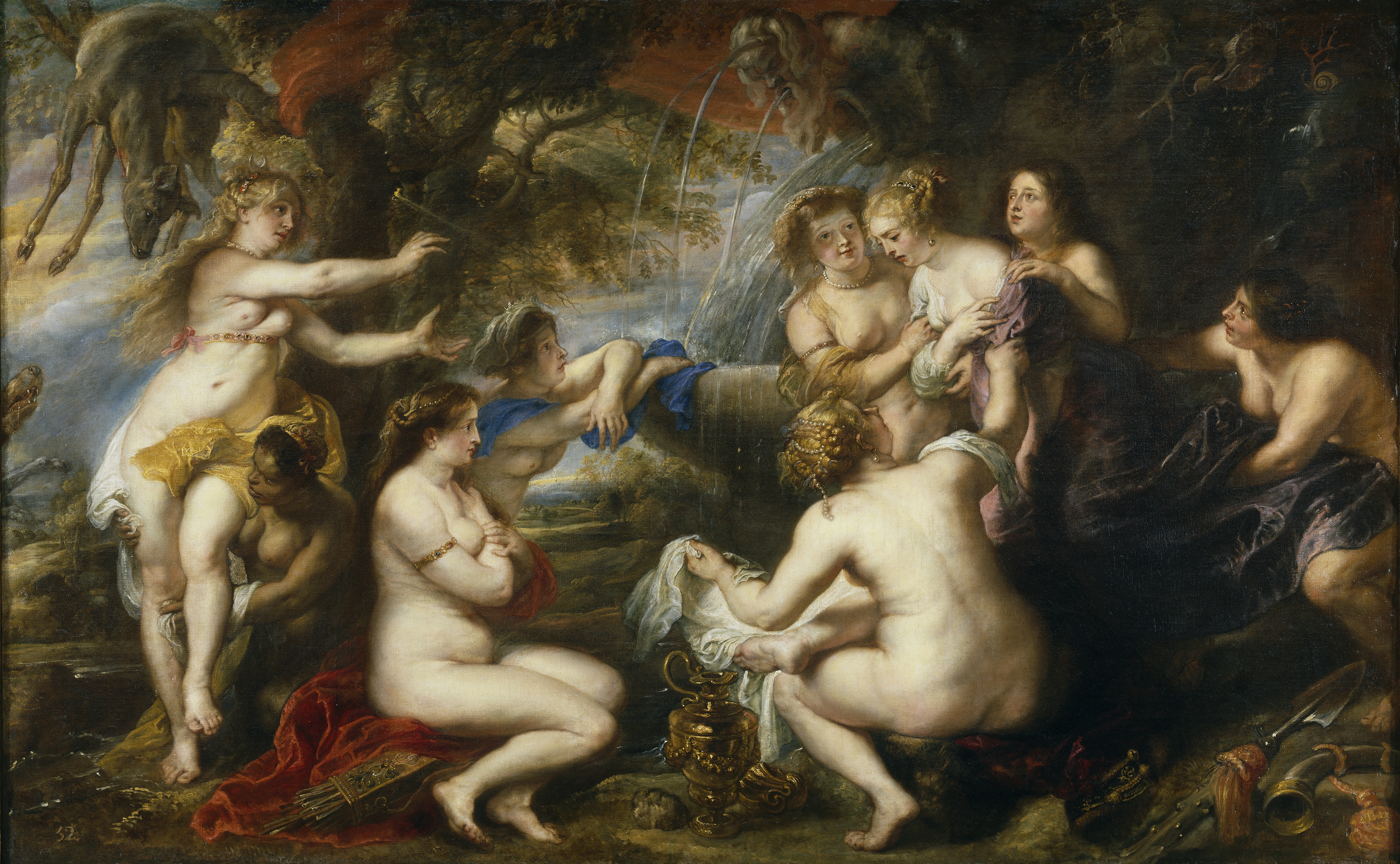
Diana and Callisto commissioned from the artist by Philip IV of Spain

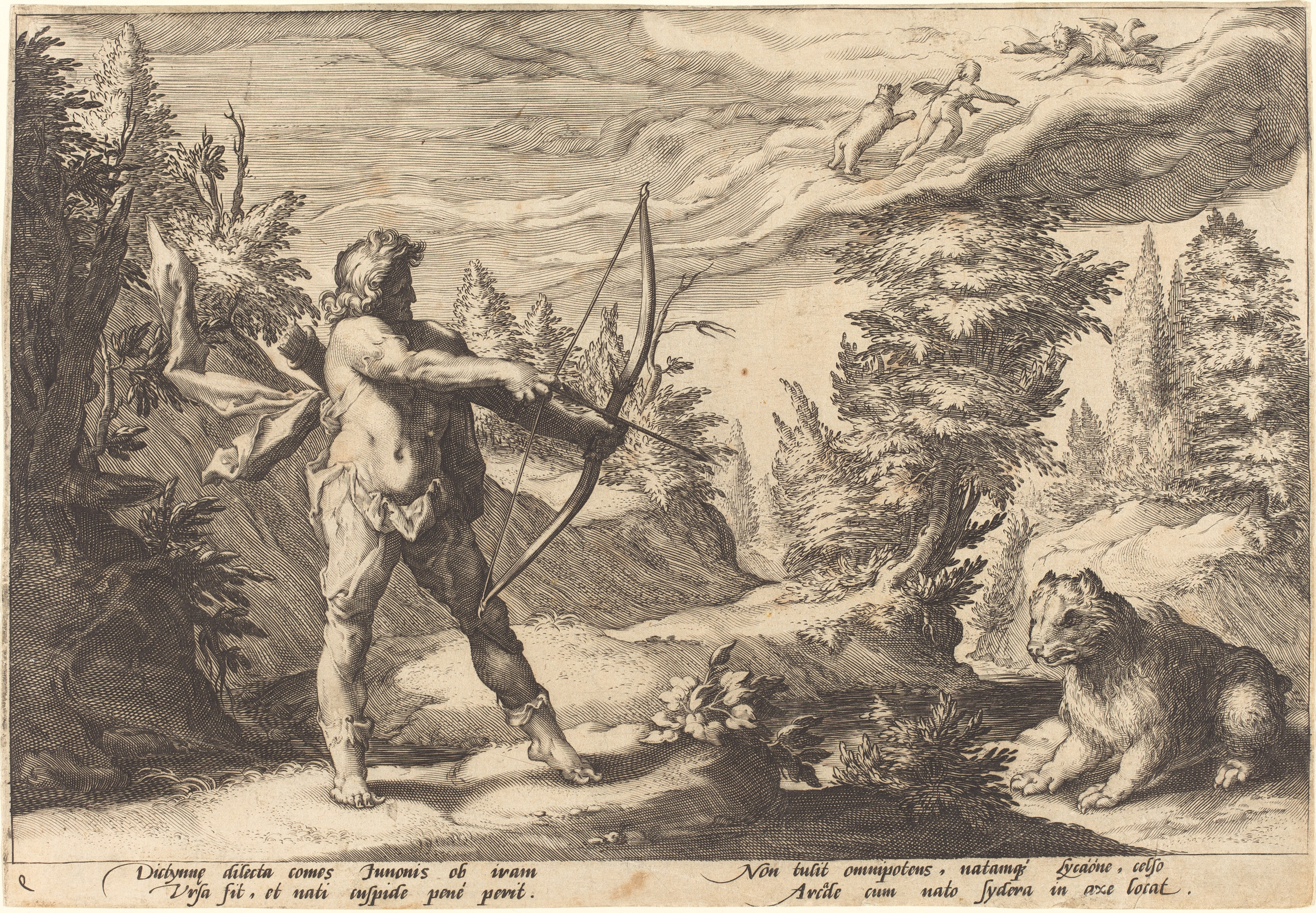
Arcas about to kill his mother, engraving by Hendrik Goltzius, 16th-17th century.

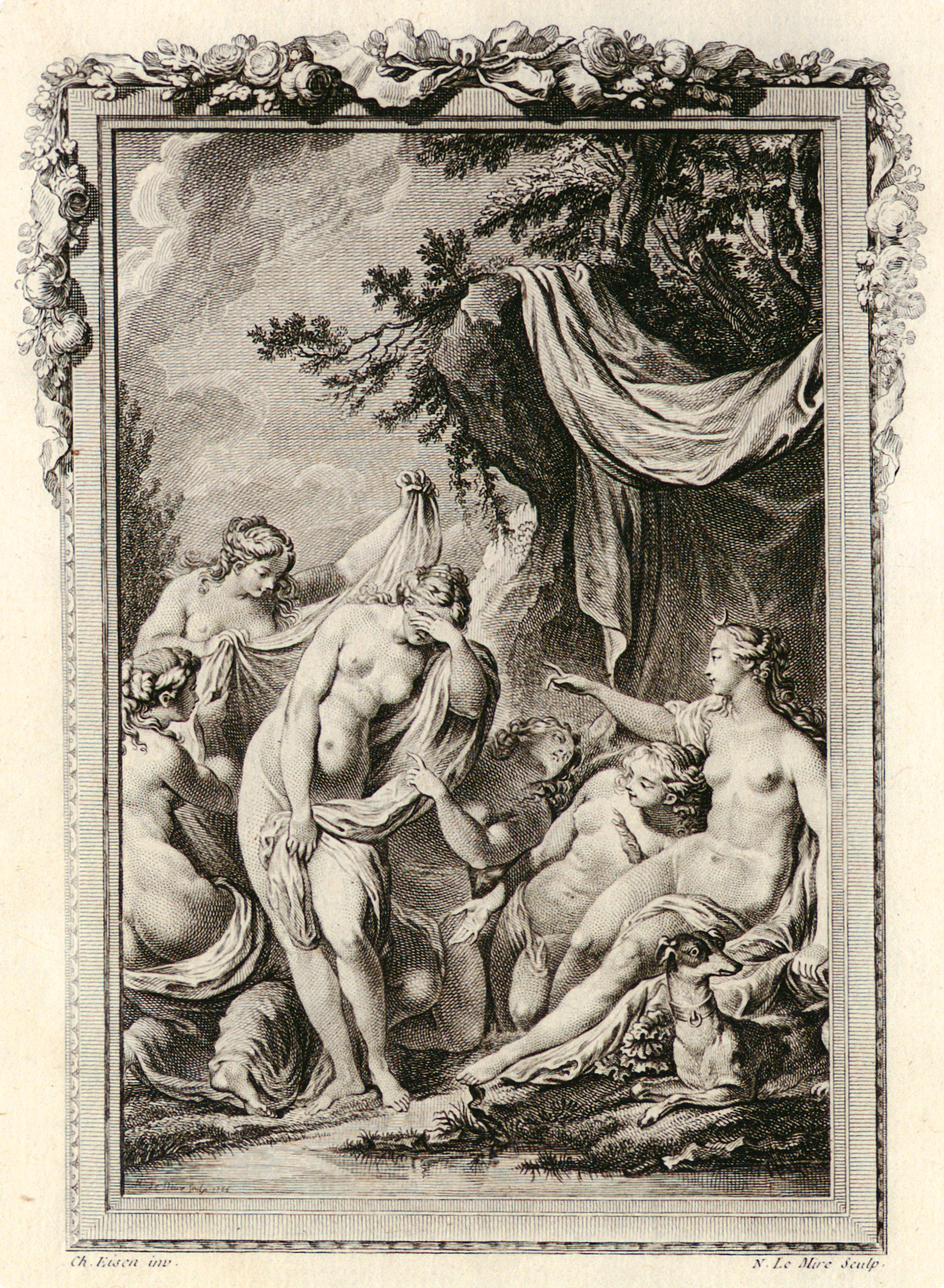
Callisto discovered by Diana, engraving by Noël Le Mire.

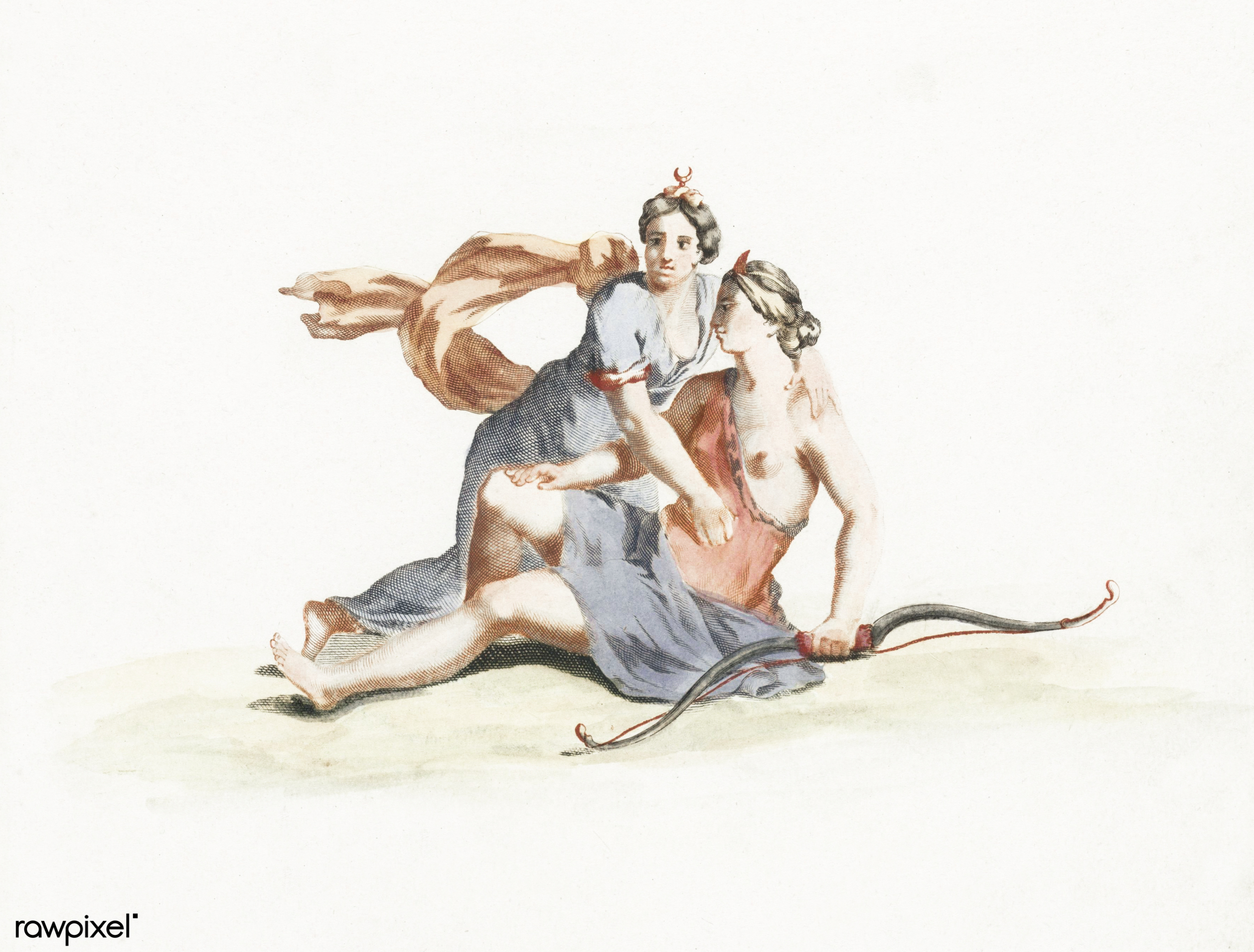
Illustration of Zeus as Artemis with Callisto, ohan Teyler (1648–1709).

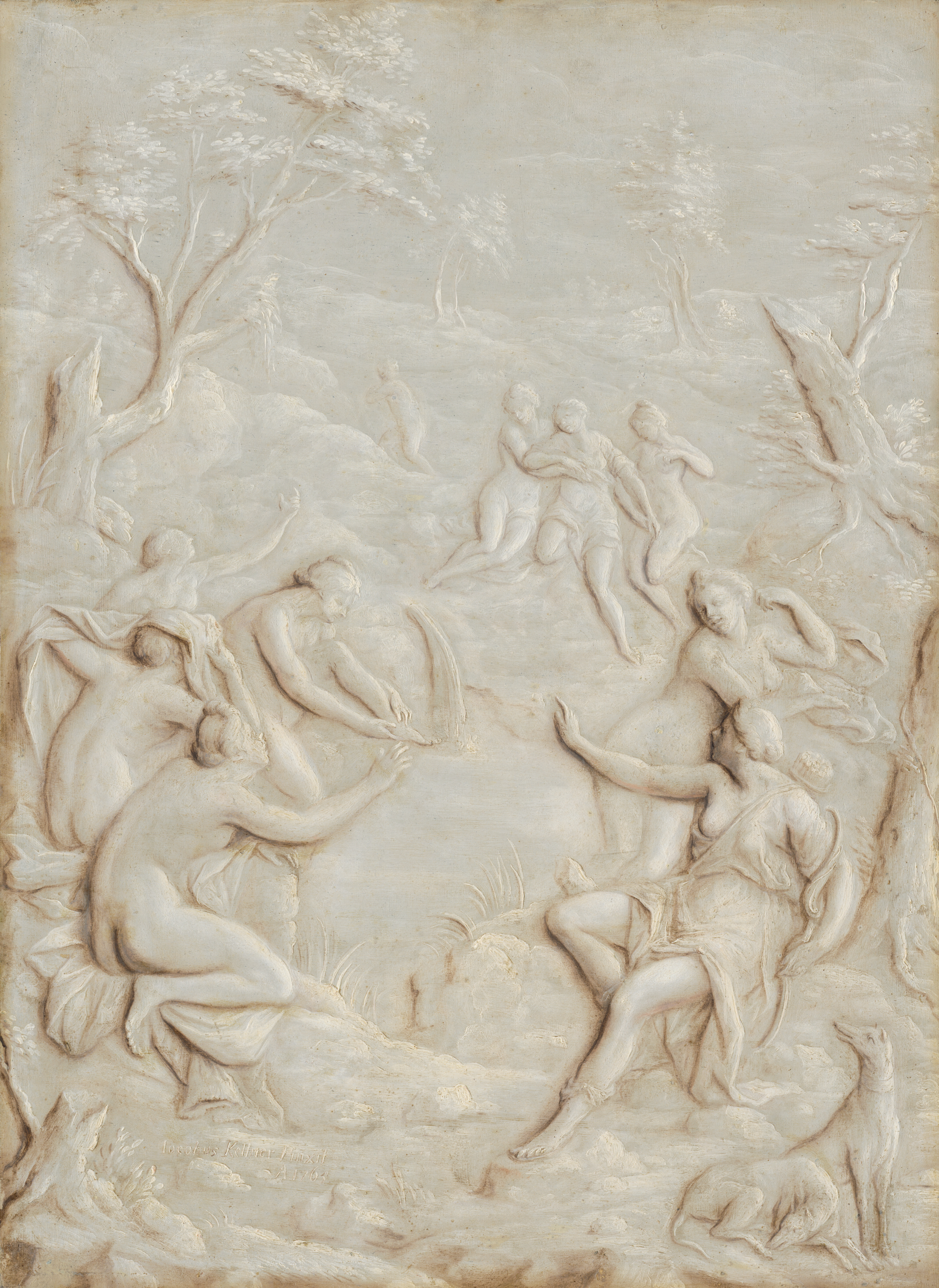
Diana and Callisto, relief by Jakob Kellner, 1763.

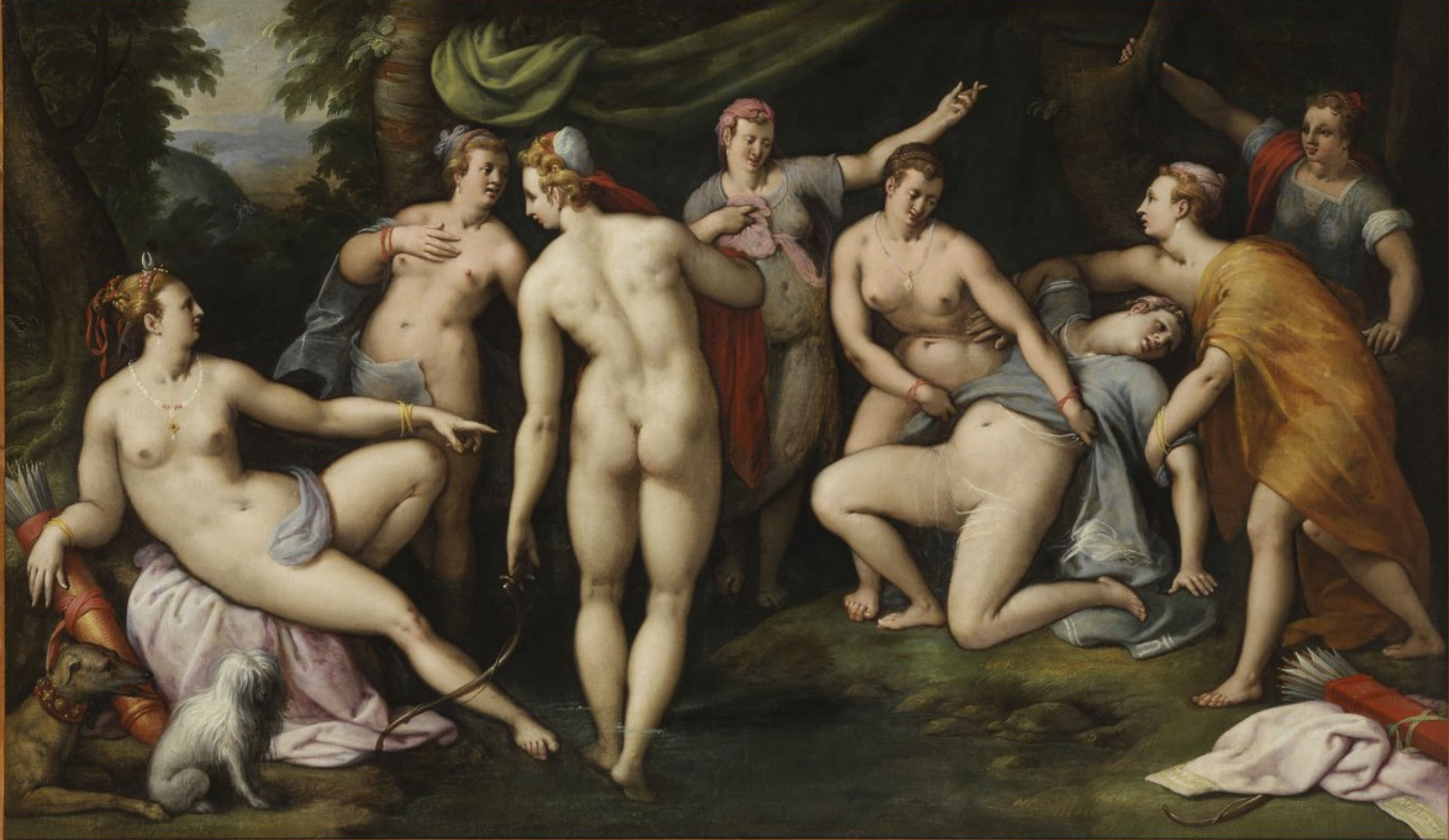
Diana and Callisto, Anthonie Blocklandt van Montfoort, c. 1580.

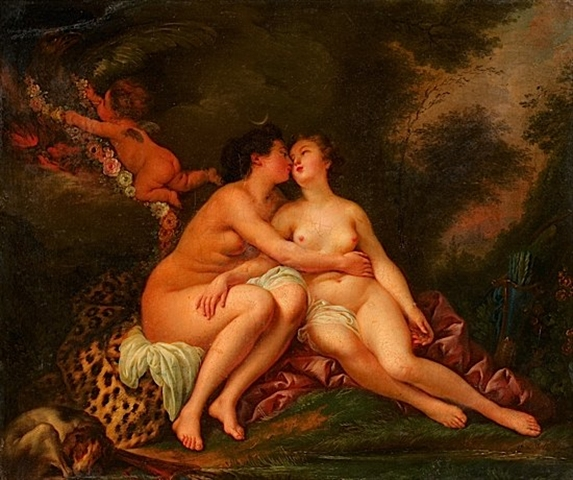
Diane et Callisto, by Nicolas-René Jollain, 1770, oil on canvas.

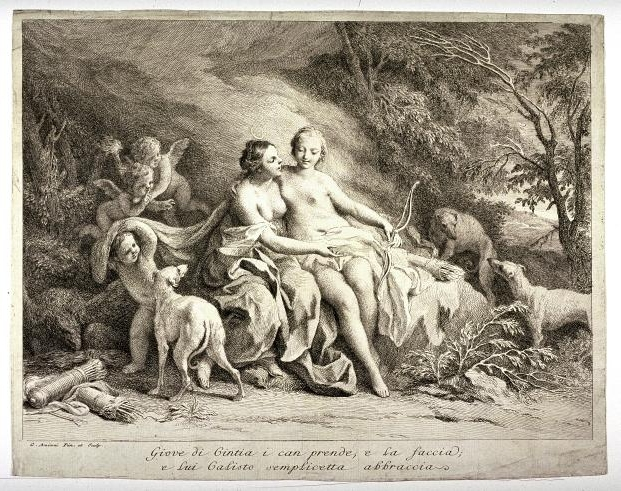
Giove e Callisto, by Jacopo Amigoni, circa 1740–1750, oil on canvas.

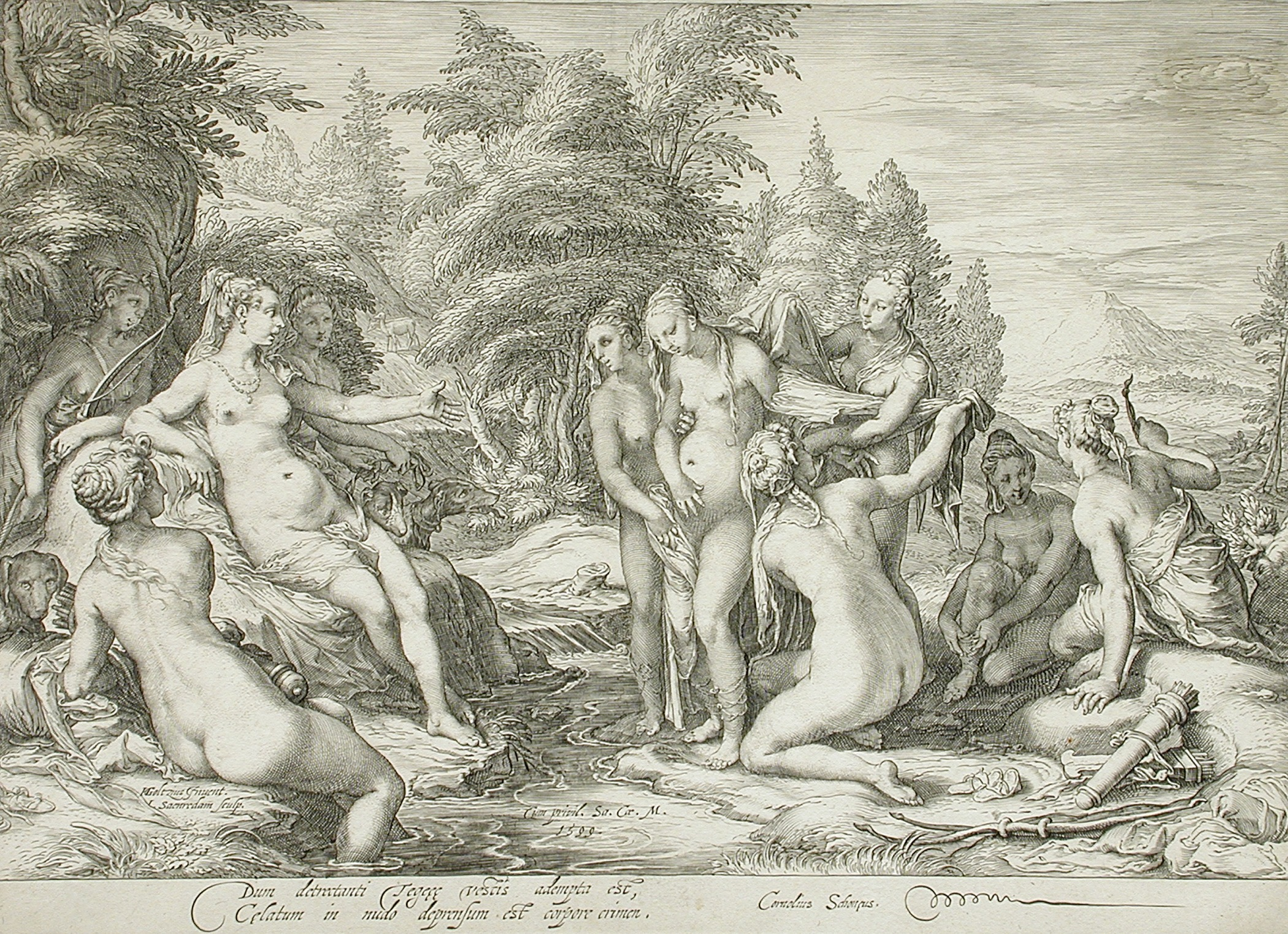
Callisto's pregnancy discovered, engraving by Jan Pietersz, 1599.

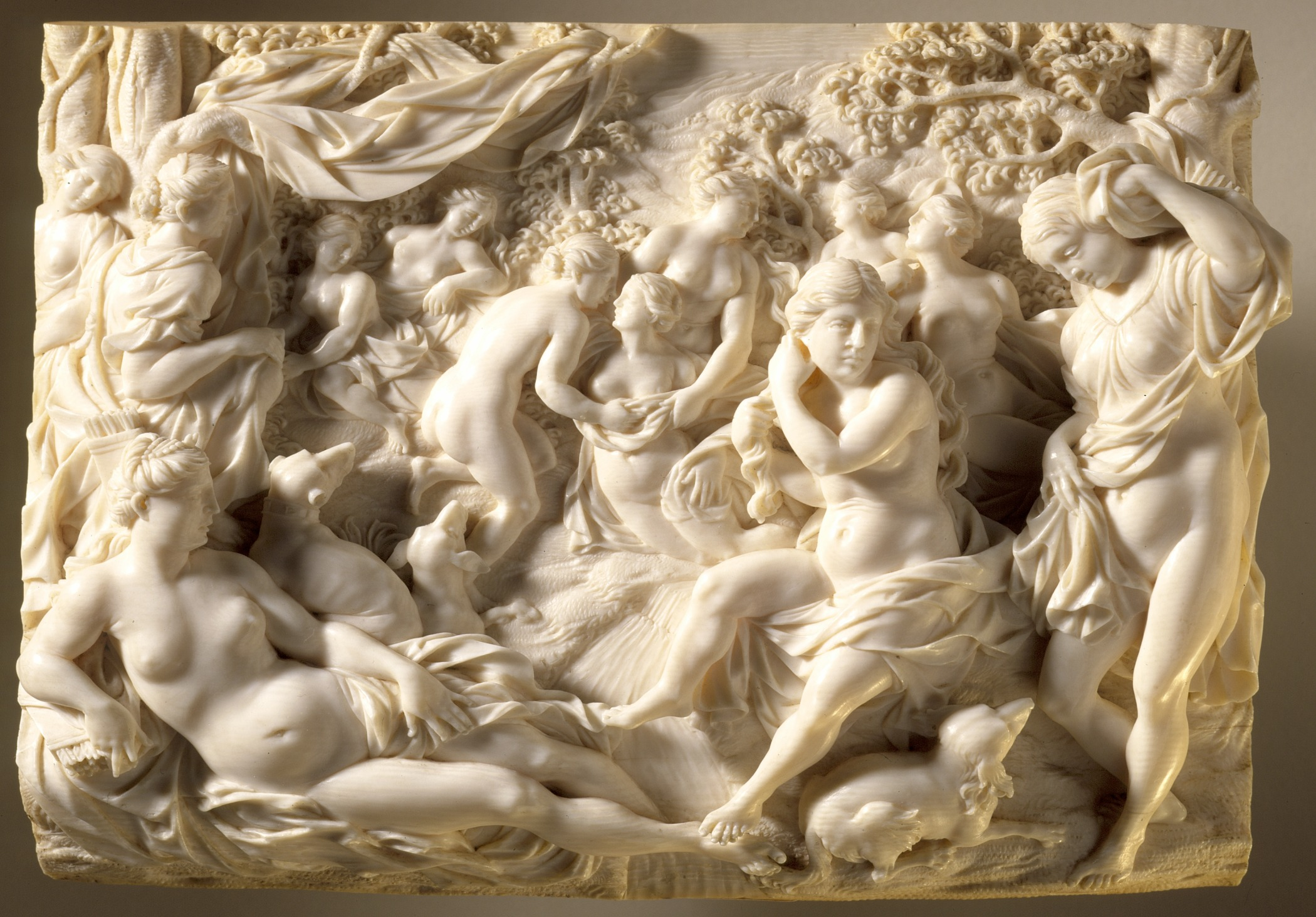
Artemis, Callisto and the nymphs, ivory relief by Ignaz Elhafen, circa 1690–1695.

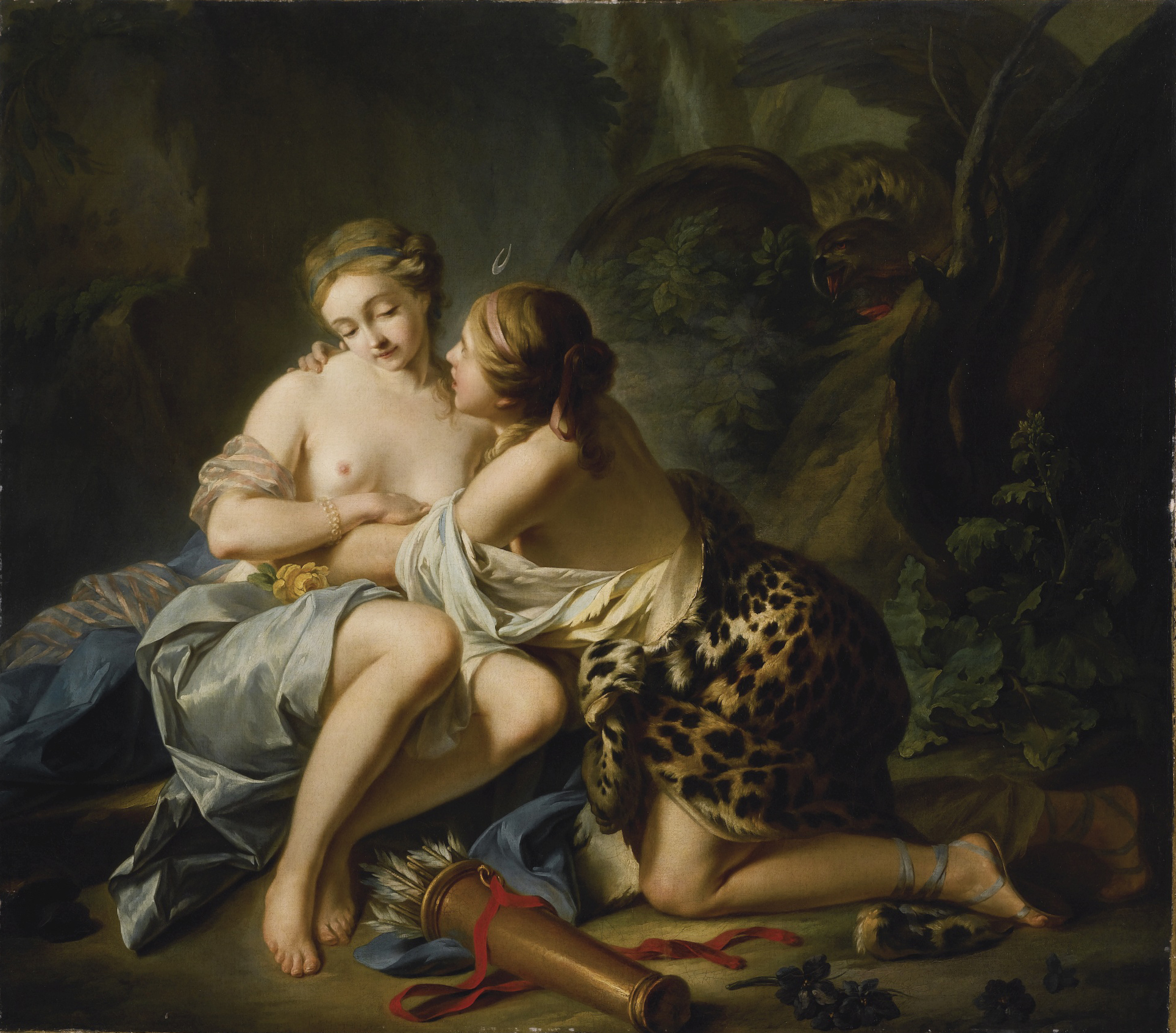
Jupiter in the guise of Diana and Callisto, by Jean-Simon Berthélemy, nineteenth century, oil on canvas.

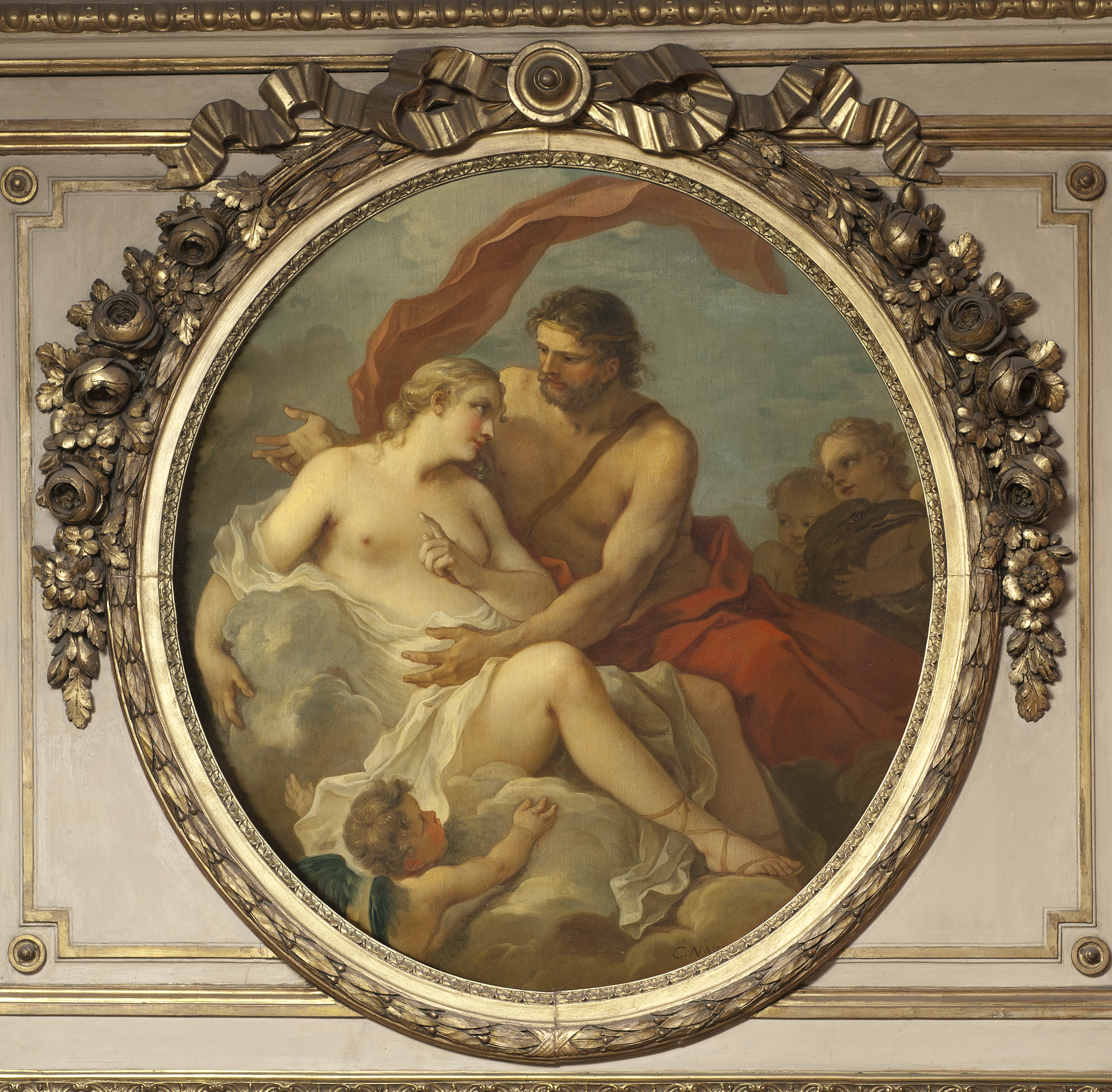
Jupiter and Callisto, by Charles-Joseph Natoire, 1745, in the National Museum of Stockholm.

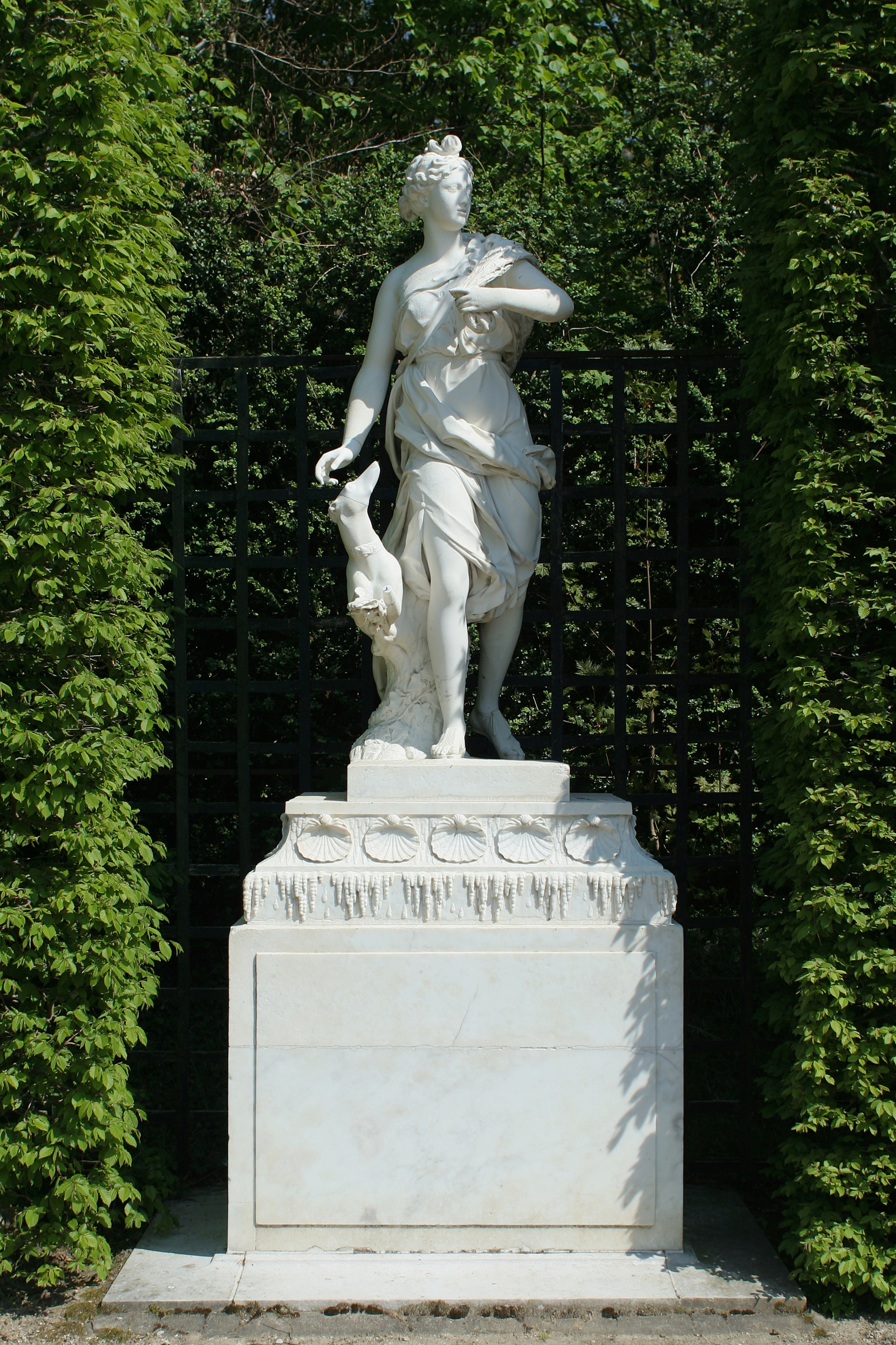
Callisto, by Anselme Flamen, 1696, Versailles.

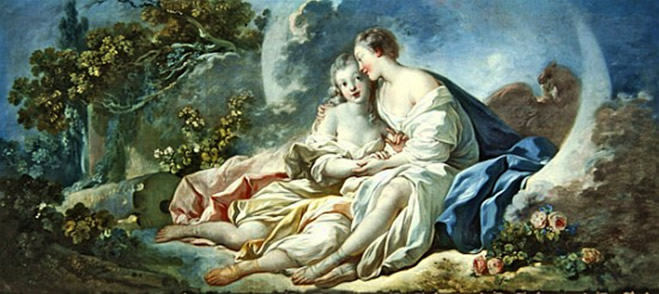
Jupiter and Callisto, by Jean-Honoré Fragonard, 1755, Musée d'Angers.

== See also ==
- Artio, a Celtic bear goddess, associated by the Romans with Artemis and Callisto
- Baucis and Philemon
- Lilaeus
- Rhodopis and Euthynicus
- Syceus
- Titanis
