= Thersanon =

One of the Argonauts

In Greek mythology, Thersanon or Thersanor (Note: The text of the Fabulae is corrupted, and the Argonaut's name has been corrected to either Thersanon or Thersanor; the form "Thersanor" appears in an alphabetic list of Argonauts on a papyrus (POxy 61.4097).) is one of the Argonauts, the crew of the legendary Argo. Born on the island of Andros, Thersanon was the son of the sun god Helios by a woman named Leucothoe; he joined Jason and the other Argonauts in the quest for the Golden Fleece, kept by King Aeëtes of Colchis, who was himself a son of Helios and thus one of Thersanon's paternal half-brothers.

== Parentage ==
Hyginus names Leucothoe as his mother; according to Ovid, Leucothoe was a mortal princess of Babylon that Helios fell in love with; but when her father discovered the affair thanks to Clytie, he buried Leucothoe alive, and afterwards her dead body was turned into a frankincense tree by Helios. Hyginus assigning them a son might indicate that he knew a very different version of the myth in which Leucothoe survives, or at least lives long enough to bear a child; alternatively Hyginus is perhaps referring to another woman, such as the sea goddess Leucothea, whom he elsewhere refers to as "Leucothoe" in the same work.

== See also ==
- Augeas
- Phaethon
- Argonautica
- List of Argonauts

== Bibliography ==
- Forbes Irving, Paul M. C. (1990). Metamorphosis in Greek Myths. Clarendon Press. ISBN 0-19-814730-9.
- Gantz, Timothy, Early Greek Myth: A Guide to Literary and Artistic Sources, Johns Hopkins University Press, 1996, Two volumes: ISBN 978-0-8018-5360-9 (Vol. 1), ISBN 978-0-8018-5362-3 (Vol. 2).
- Hyginus, Gaius Julius, The Myths of Hyginus. Edited and translated by Mary A. Grant, Lawrence: University of Kansas Press, 1960.
- Hard, Robin, The Routledge Handbook of Greek Mythology: Based on H.J. Rose's "Handbook of Greek Mythology", Psychology Press, 2004, ISBN 9780415186360. Google Books.
- Ovid. Metamorphoses, Volume I: Books 1-8. Translated by Frank Justus Miller. Revised by G. P. Goold. Loeb Classical Library No. 42. Cambridge, Massachusetts: Harvard University Press, 1977, first published 1916. ISBN 978-0-674-99046-3
- Scott Smith R.; Trzaskoma, Stephen M., Apollodorus' Library and Hyginus' Fabulae: Two Handbooks of Greek Mythology, Hackett Publishing Company, Inc, 2007, ISBN 978-0-87220-821-6. Google books.
- Smith, William, Dictionary of Greek and Roman Biography and Mythology, London (1873). Online version at the Perseus Digital Library.
