= Elaea (mythology) =

Greek mythological character

In Greek mythology, Elaea (Ancient Greek: Ἐλαία, romanized: Elaia, lit. 'olive') is an Attic girl whose impressive athletic achievements and beauty won the favour of Athena as well as the envy of the other Atticans. Her story shares many elements with that of Myrsine. Her brief tale survives in the works of Nicolaus Sophista, a Greek sophist and rhetor who lived during the fifth century AD.

== Mythology ==
Elaea was an extremely athletic girl who outdid all girls in beauty and all boys in strength, winning the favour of Athena, the virgin goddess of wisdom and patron goddess of Attica. Elaea beat all her opponents in both the ring and the race; many of her fellow athletes grew resentful and murdered her out of envy. Athena took pity on Elaea, and for Athena's sake Gaia, the goddess of the earth, metamorphosed the dead girl into an olive tree, which was the most sacred tree associated with Athens and Athena.

== Culture ==
A similar, almost word-for-word, story was also told about another maiden, Myrsine, who was changed into a myrtle shrub.

== See also ==
- Arachne
- Myrina
- Myrmex

== Bibliography ==
- Forbes Irving, Paul M. C. (1990). Metamorphosis in Greek Myths. Clarendon Press. ISBN 0-19-814730-9.
- Westermann, Anton (1843). Μυθογραφοι. Scriptores poeticæ historiæ Græci. Edidit A. W. Gr.
