= Leucothoe (daughter of Orchamus) =

Figure in Greek mythology

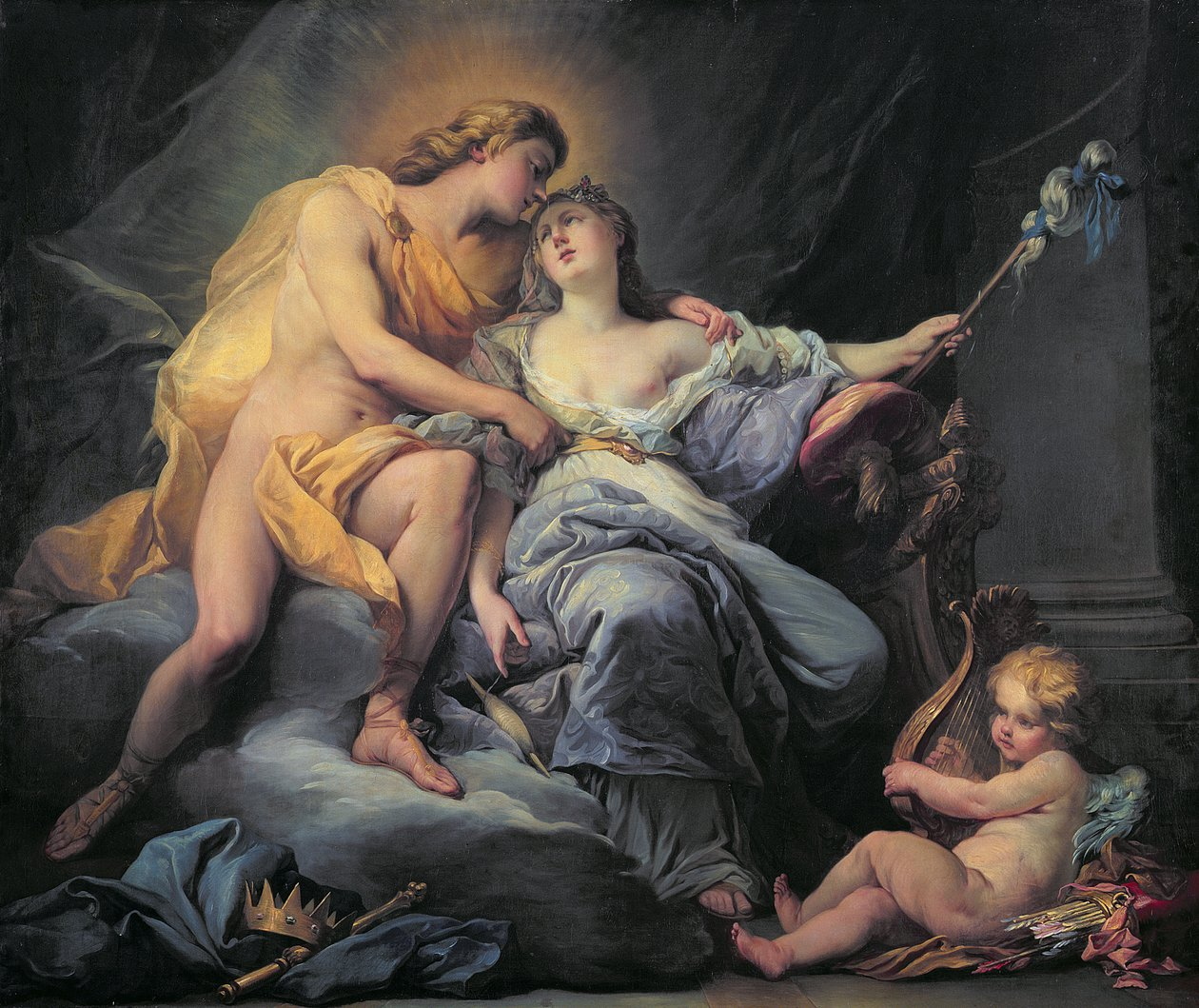
- Apollo (as Helios the Sun) caressing the Nymph Leucothea, by Antoine Boizot
- Abode: Persia, Boeotia or Andros

Genealogy
- Parents: Orchamus and Eurynome
- Siblings: Clytie (one version)
- Consort: Helios
- Children: Thersanon

In Greek mythology, Leucothoe (Ancient Greek: Λευκοθόη, romanized: Leukothóê or Leukothoē, lit. 'running white water', Ancient Greek pronunciation: [leu̯.koˈt^{h}o.εː]) was a Babylonian princess. The daughter of Orchamus, a king of Persia, Leucothoe was either a lover of the sun god Helios or a victim of rape. A nymph or Leucothoe's own sister, named Clytie, who loved Helios and was jealous of Leucothoe, informed Leucothoe's father that Leucothoe, despite being unmarried, was no longer a virgin, whereupon Orchamus buried his daughter alive in punishment. Helios then transformed Leucothoe's dead body into a frankincense tree.

The tale is best known from the Augustan poet Ovid's narrative poem Metamorphoses, in which the fullest account of it survives, although references and allusions to Leucothoe's story survive in other sources as well.

== Mythology ==
=== Ovid ===
As punishment for informing her husband Hephaestus of her affair with Ares, Aphrodite cursed Helios to fall in love with Leucothoe. Utterly enamored with her, Helios lingered in the sky by rising earlier and setting later to spend more time watching her, making the winter days longer. He forgot about his previous lovers, including Rhodos, Clymene, Perse, and Clytie, who felt betrayed after being loved and abandoned by him.

Son of Hyperion, what use to you now are beauty, lustre, and radiant light? Surely, you who make all countries burn with your fires, burn with a new fire. You, who should discern everything, contemplate Leucothoë, and your eyes, that ought to be fixed on the whole earth, are fixed on one virgin girl. Sometimes you rise too early in the dawn sky. Sometimes you sink too late into the waves. Thinking of her, you lengthen the winter hours. Sometimes you vanish, your mind’s defect affecting your light, and, obscured, terrify men’s hearts. It is not because the moon’s shadow, closer to the earth, eclipses you, that you fade. It is that love of yours that determines your aspect. You only love her.

— Ovid, Metamorphoses, lines 4.192–204, translation by A. S. Kline.

Eventually, Helios disguised himself as her mother, Eurynome, to gain entrance to her chambers, (Note: Compare how Vertumnus approached Pomona.) and once he got there, he dismissed her servants and revealed himself to Leucothoe. He confessed his love to her, and she, "conquered, suffered his force" according to Ovid, or he had sex with her in others.

But Clytie, still in love with him and consumed with jealousy, reported Leucothoe's affair to her father, Orchamus, who punished his defiled daughter by burying her alive, as she pleaded with him in despair. Leucothoe died before Helios could save her. Overcome with grief, Helios shone his rays upon her but could not revive her. So he sprinkled her body with "fragrant nectar" and turned her into a frankincense tree so that she would still breathe air, after a fashion, instead of staying buried beneath the earth. Clytie, meanwhile, scorned by Helios for her involvement in Leucothoe's death, sat on the ground pining away, neither eating nor drinking, constantly turning her face toward the Sun, until finally she became the heliotrope, whose purple flowers follow the Sun every day on his diurnal journey across the sky.

=== Other versions ===
According to Lactantius Placidus, Ovid got this myth from Hesiod, although some scholars doubt this particular attribution. His abridged version largely follows Ovid's own, but contains certain differences. Like Ovid, Lactantius does not clarify how Clytie knew about Helios and Leucothoe, or how Helios knew it was Clytie who had informed the king.

In another narrative, after Helios had intercourse with Leucothoe, the girl who caused Leucothoe's doom is identified as her (unnamed) sister, (Note: In Hesiod, Clytie is identified as an Oceanid nymph, and Ovid, while making no mention of Clytie's parentage, does not seem to treat them as related.) and their father's name is Orchomenus instead, which is also the name of a town in Beotia, suggesting in this version the myth took place there and not in Babylon. The anonymous author mentions by name the plants the two sisters turned into, contrasting the vagueness of Ovid's telling. Hyginus might have known a very different version of this myth, for he names one of the Argonauts, Thersanon, as the son of Helios and Leucothoe, and places her in Andros rather than Persia, implying a version where Leucothoe survives (at least for as long as it took to produce a child). However, he could simply be referring to a different Leucothoe.

Some scholars have suggested that the stories of Leucothoe and Clytie were originally two distinct ones that were combined along with a third story, that of Helios discovering Ares and Aphrodite's affair and then informing Hephaestus, into a single tale either by Ovid himself or Ovid's source.

== Culture ==
It's been suggested that this myth was used to explain the use of frankincense in the god's worship, similar to the story of the nymph Daphne, who transformed into a laurel tree; Leucothoe's death by burial at the hands of her male guardian, not unlike Antigone's fate, might denote archaic cult practices involving human sacrifice in tree-related worship.

== See also ==
- Smilax
- Crocus
- Hyacinthus
- Picolous
- Libanus
