= Libanus (mythology) =

Greek mythological figure

In Greek mythology, Libanus (Ancient Greek: Λίβανος, romanized: Libanos) is a character in a minor myth who was transformed into a small aromatic shrub. His brief myth survives in the works of Nicolaus Sophista, a Greek sophist and rhetor of the fifth century AD, and the Geoponica, a Byzantine Greek collection of agricultural lore, compiled during the tenth century in Constantinople for the Byzantine emperor Constantine VII Porphyrogenitus.

== Etymology ==
The ancient Greek noun Λίβανος translates to 'frankincense', and by extension the tree; it is derived from a Semitic root related to the word for white (lbn).

== Mythology ==
The Syrian or Assyrian Libanus, who shared a name with a mountain range and the land both, was a young man who had been offered to the gods in a temple before he had even been born. Some impious people, in jealousy, killed him. Gaia, the goddess of the earth, honouring the other gods, transformed him into a plant that bore his name and was similarly dedicated to the gods, and people who offered incense to the gods were seen as more pious than those who offered gold.

== Interpretation ==
Two distinct plants are connected to Libanus's name; the first is the λίβανος (libanos), meaning incense and by extension the frankincense tree (boswellia sacra), and the second the δενδρολίβανον (dendrolibanon, literally "tree Libanus") meaning rosemary. The unidentified author of the Geoponica clarifies that the myth is indeed about the rosemary. If the incense interpretation is taken into account, then Libanus's story can be compared with that of Leucothoe, a Persian princess who was transformed into a frankincense tree as well.

== See also ==
- Leucothoe, another woman who transformed into frankincense tree
- Amaracus
- Myrsine

== Bibliography ==
- Anonymous (1805). Geoponika: Agricultural Pursuits. Vol. II. Translated by Thomas Owen. London.
- Beekes, Robert S. P. (2009). Lucien van Beek (ed.). Etymological Dictionary of Greek. Leiden Indo-European Etymological Dictionary Series. Vol. 1. Leiden, the Netherlands: Brill Publications. ISBN 978-90-04-17420-7.
- Ascherson, Ferdinand (1884). Berliner Studien für classische Philologie und Archaeologie. Calvary.
- Forbes Irving, Paul M. C. (1990). Metamorphosis in Greek Myths. Clarendon Press. ISBN 0-19-814730-9.
- Liddell, Henry George; Scott, Robert (1940). A Greek-English Lexicon, revised and augmented throughout by Sir Henry Stuart Jones with the assistance of Roderick McKenzie. Oxford: Clarendon Press. Online version at Perseus.tufts project.
- Westermann, Anton (1843). Μυθογραφοι. Scriptores poeticæ historiæ Græci. Edidit A. W. Gr.
