= The Empire of Flora =

Painting by Nicolas Poussin

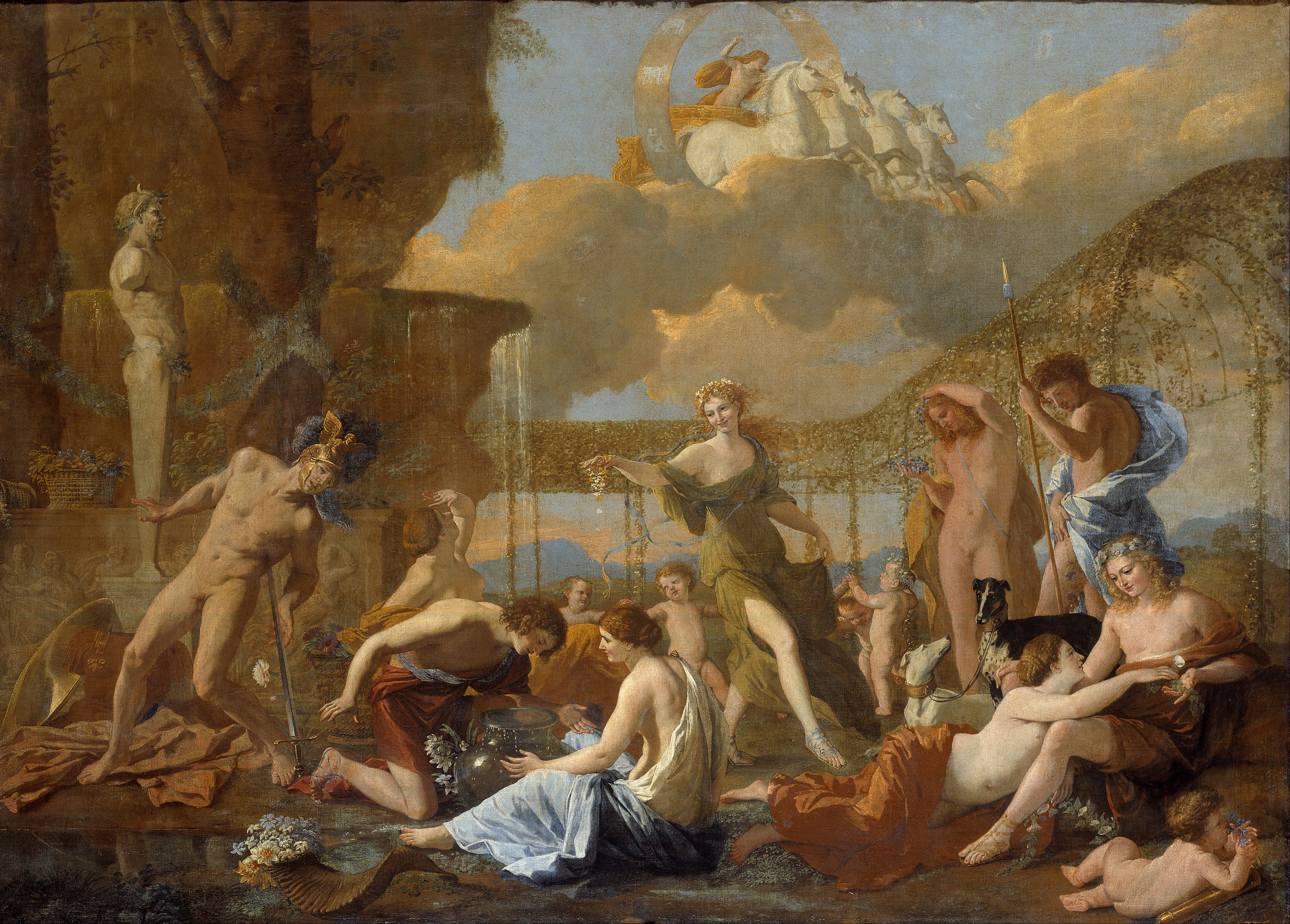
The Empire of Flora, 131 x 181 cm

The Empire of Flora (German: Das Reich der Flora) is an oil painting by Nicolas Poussin, dated to about 1630 or 1631, which is now in the Gemäldegalerie Alte Meister in Dresden. It is also referred to as The Realm of Flora.

== Description ==
This subject is taken from the fabulous stories of the individuals metamorphosed into flowers who are here represented as engaged in those acts which preceded their change. In the centre of the group are Narcissus and Echo; the former is bending over a vase of water, sighing with love of his own image; the latter sits by, gazing on him with enamoured eyes. Beyond these is Clytie viewing with rapture the God of Day pass in his refulgent chariot through the heavens. On the left is Ajax, disappointed in his ambition, perishing on his own sword. In the opposite side is Smilax lying on the lap of Crocus; and a little retired from these is the young huntsman, Adonis, with a spear in his hand, and two dogs near him; and still more remote stands the beautiful Hyacinthus. In the midst of these, Flora is seen dancing in exulting triumph, scattering flowers over the pining lovers around her. Several cupids, linked hand in hand, are behind the goddess, and a solitary one lies close to the front with a bunch of flowers in his hand. The scene exhibits the parterre of a garden surrounded with bowers.

Some have argued that picture was painted for the Cardinal Omodei. Engraved by Audran. However, as Emily A. Beeny asserts, it is believed that its patron was Fabrizio Valguarnera, an art merchant and jewel thief.

== Bibliography ==
- Smith, John (1837). A Catalogue Raisonné of the Works of the Most Eminent Dutch, Flemish and French Painters: Nicholas Poussin, Claude Lorraine, and Jean Baptist Greuze. Vol. 8. London: Smith and Son. pp. 126 (no. 243), 135 (no. 269).
- Beeny, Emily A. and Francesca Whitlum-Cooper. (2022) Poussin and the Dance. The Getty Museum.
