= Mecon =

Mecon may refer to:

- Truncated octahedron or mecon, an Archimedean solid
- Master of Economics (M.Econ.), a postgraduate master's degree
- MECON (company), an Indian steel company
- Mecon, a figure in Greek mythology

== See also ==
- Mekon (disambiguation)
