= Mekon =

Mekon may refer to:

== Arts and entertainment ==
- Mekon (musician), John Gosling (born c.1963), British electronic musician
- The Mekon, ruler of the Treens in the Dan Dare stories in the Eagle comic
- The Mekons, a British punk rock band

== Other uses ==
- Mekon (mythology), or Mecon, a figure in Greek mythology
- Mekon (crustacean), a genus in family Tanaididae

== See also ==
- Mekong (disambiguation)
- Mecon (disambiguation)
