= Mekong (disambiguation) =

The Mekong is a river in East and Southeast Asia.

Mekong may also refer to:

- Mekong (TV series), a 2023–2024 Thai action series
- Mekong Airlines, a Cambodian airline
- Mekong Auto, a Vietnamese auto manufacturer
- Mekong Delta, region in southwestern Vietnam
- Mekong Institute, an intergovernmental organization in Southeast Asia

== See also ==
- Mekon (disambiguation)
