= Myrsine (mythology) =

Greek mythological character

In Greek mythology, Myrsine (Ancient Greek: Μυρσίνη, romanized: Mursínē, lit. 'myrtle') is an Attic girl who won the favour of Athena thanks to her impressive athletic achievements and her beauty, and the envy of the other Atticans for the same reason. Her brief tale survives in the Geoponica, a Byzantine Greek collection of agricultural lore, compiled during the tenth century in Constantinople for the Byzantine emperor Constantine VII Porphyrogenitus.

== Etymology ==
The Ancient Greek word μυρσίνη (myrsínē) means 'myrtle'. Other spellings and forms include μυρρίνη (myrrhínē), masc. μύρρινος (mýrrhinos) for the plant overall and myrtle wreaths, while the berry is μύρτον (mýrton) or μυρτίς (myrtís). Myrsine and its variants is probably of Semitic origin, but unrelated to the word for myrrh, μύρρα (mýrrha) or σμύρνα (smýrna), despite the strong resemblance between the two words. Robert Beekes suggested a pre-Greek origin due to the myrt-/myrs- variation.

== Mythology ==
The Attican maiden Myrsine surpassed all girls in beauty and all boys in strength, winning herself the favour of Athena, the virgin goddess of wisdom and patron-goddess of Attica. She excelled in both the ring and the race, beating all of her opponents. Many of her fellow athletes were envious and grew resentful, so they murdered her. But Athena took pity in her favourite, and turned the dead girl into a myrtle, which was 'not less acceptable to Athena than the olive tree'.

== Connections ==
A similar, almost word-for-word, story was also told about another maiden, Elaea, who was changed into an olive tree. The myrtle was also seen as Aphrodite's sacred plant, and she too had a story connecting her to it.

== See also ==
- Arachne
- Myrina
- Myrmex

== Bibliography ==
- Anonymous (1805). Geoponika: Agricultural Pursuits. Vol. II. Translated by Thomas Owen. London.
- Beekes, Robert S. P. (2010). Lucien van Beek (ed.). Etymological Dictionary of Greek. Leiden Indo-European Etymological Dictionary Series. Vol. ΙΙ. Leiden, the Netherlands: Brill Publications. ISBN 978-90-04-17419-1.
- Cancik, Hubert; Schneider, Helmuth; Salazar, Christine F.; Orton, David E. (2002). Brill's New Pauly: Encyclopaedia of the Ancient World. Vol. IX. Brill Publications. ISBN 978-90-04-12272-7.
- Forbes Irving, Paul M. C. (1990). Metamorphosis in Greek Myths. Clarendon Press. ISBN 0-19-814730-9.
- Liddell, Henry George; Scott, Robert (1940). A Greek-English Lexicon, revised and augmented throughout by Sir Henry Stuart Jones with the assistance of Roderick McKenzie. Oxford: Clarendon Press. Online version at Perseus.tufts project.
- New York (State) Legislature Assembly (March 28, 1865). Documents of the Assembly of the State of New York. Vol. 9. C. Wendell.
- Versnel, Henk (1993). Inconsistencies in Greek and Roman Religion. Vol. II: Transition and Reversal in Myth and Ritual. Leiden, the Netherlands: Brill Publications. ISBN 90-04-09266-8.
