= Crocus (mythology) =

Greek mythological figure

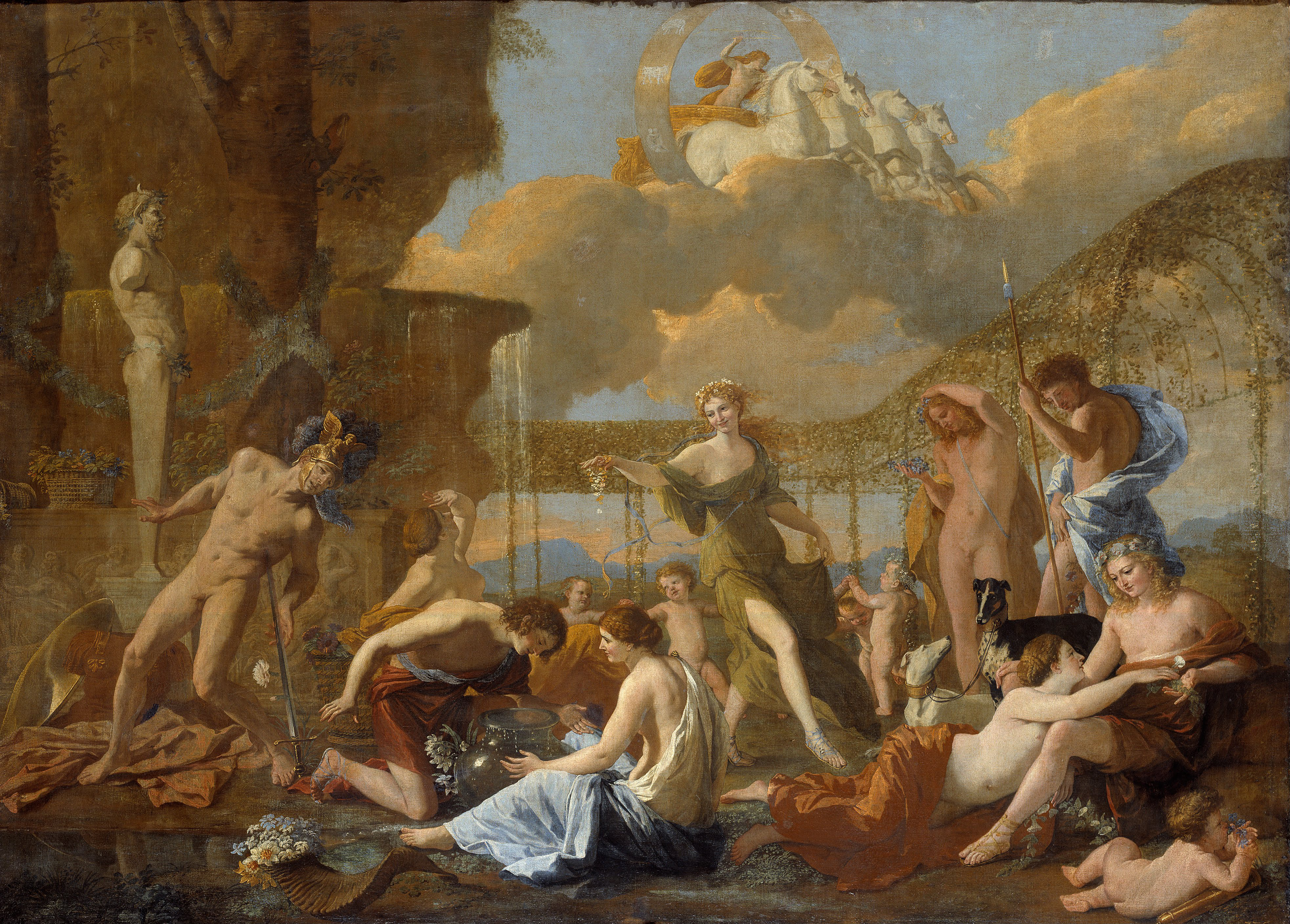
Crocus and Smilax, detail from The Empire of Flora by Nicolas Poussin. Oil-on-canvas painting, 1631.

In Greek and Roman mythology, Crocus (Ancient Greek: Κρόκος, romanized: Krókos, lit. 'saffron') is a mortal young man who was changed by the gods into a saffron flower. Depending on the version, Crocus was the lover of either the nymph Smilax or the god Hermes.

== Mythology ==
Crocus was unhappy with his love affair with the nymph Smilax, and he was turned by the gods into a plant bearing his name, the crocus (saffron). Smilax is believed to have been given a similar fate and transformed into bindweed.

In another variation of the myth, Crocus was said to be a companion of Hermes and was accidentally killed by the god in a game of discus when he unexpectedly stood up. As the unfortunate youth's blood dripped on the soil, the saffron flower came to be. The myth is similar to that of Apollo and Hyacinthus, and may indeed be a variation or modelled after it thereof.

In his translation and commentary of Nonnos' Dionysiaca, W.H.D. Rouse describes the tale of Crocus as being from the late Classical period and little-known.

== See also ==
Other instances of plant transformation in Greek myth:

- Clytie
- Hyacinthus, another youth killed in a discus accident and turned into a flower
- Psalacantha, transformed into a shrub as punishment
- Myrina
