= Alexander Tschirch =

German-Swiss pharmacist

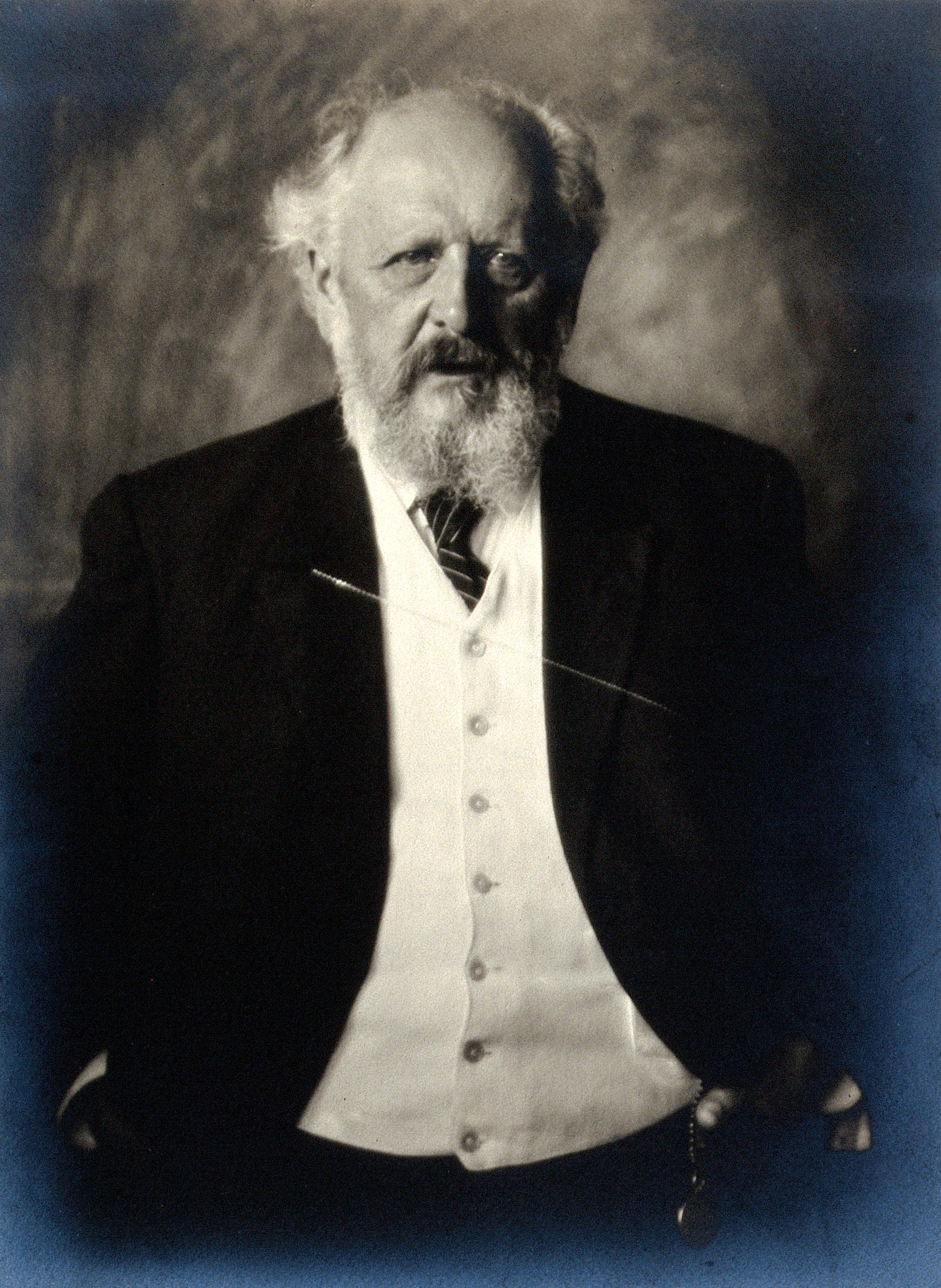
Alexander Tschirch (1926)

Alexander Tschirch (17 October 1856 – 2 December 1939) was a German-Swiss pharmacist born in Guben.

He received pharmacy training in Dresden and at the Berner Staatsapotheke (Bern state apothecary). From 1878 to 1880 he studied at the University of Berlin, earning his PhD at Freiburg in 1881, followed by a degree in botany from Berlin in 1884. In 1889–90 he took a study tour of India, Ceylon and Java. From 1890 to 1932 he was a professor of pharmacy and pharmacognosy at the University of Bern, serving as rector in 1908–09.

Tschirch is known for his studies in plant anatomy and for his research of resins and anthraquinone glycosides. He made significant contributions towards the fourth and fifth editions of the Pharmacopoeia Helvetica. He was the author of twenty books and numerous journal articles; among his written works is "Die Harze und die Harzbehälter mit Einschluss der Milchsäfte", a highly regarded reference book on resins and other plant extracts.

He became corresponding member of the Société de Pharmacie of Paris in 1893, honorary member of the Swiss Parmaceutical Society in 1906, and was given an honorary doctorate from the Faculty of Medicine of Berne and of the Federal Polytechnic Institute of Zurich. He received the Flückiger medal, the Hanbury medal (1907) and the Werner medal. A member of many scientific societies, he was also vice-president of the Commission de la Pharmacopée helvétique.

== Written works ==
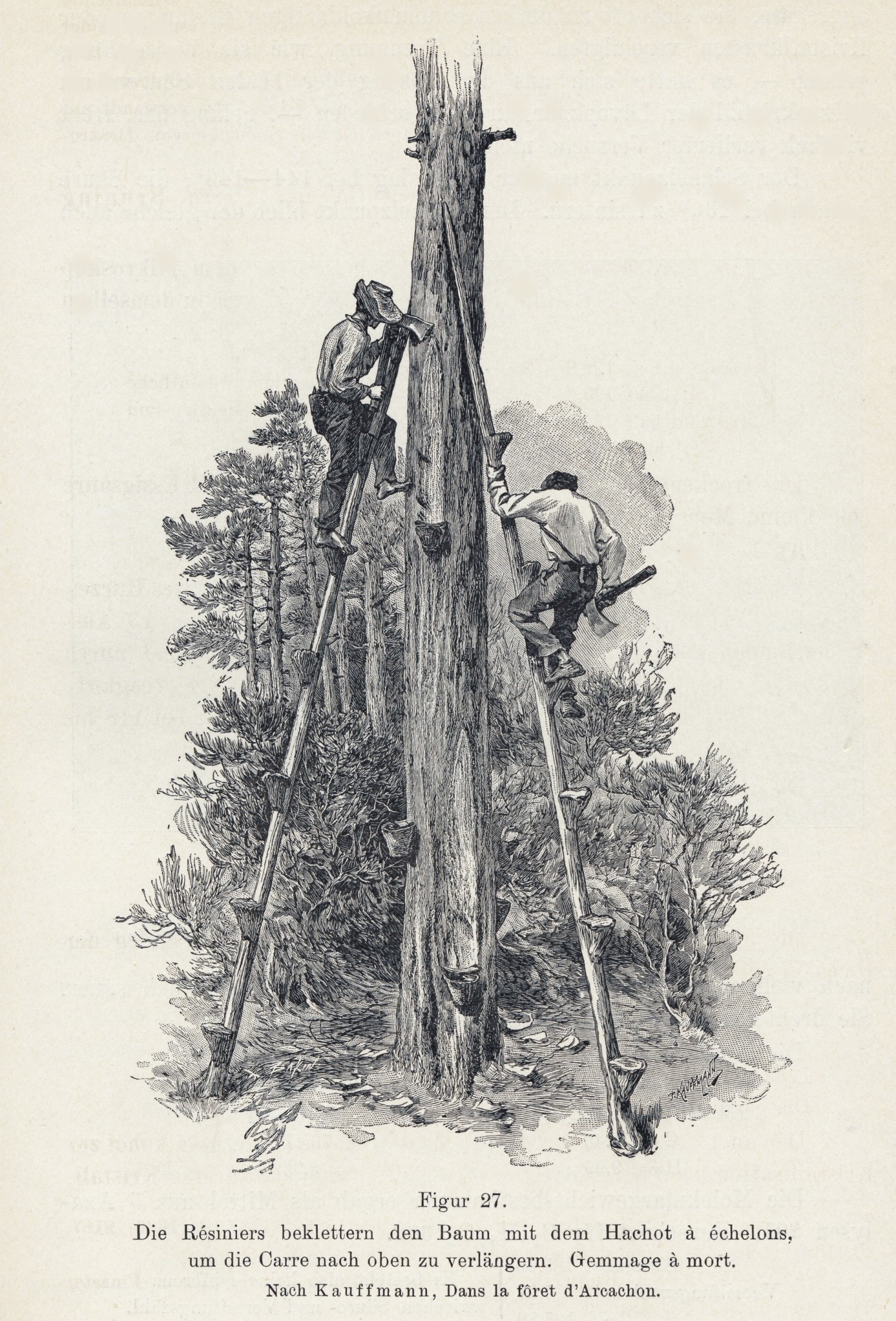
Resin extraction in France, from Tschirch's "Die Harze und die Harzbehälter mit Einschluss der Milchsäfte" (2nd edition 1906, page 557)

In 1922 he published in the Journal suisse de Pharmacie a notice titled « Cinquante ans au service de la Pharmacie et des Sciences naturelles » and a list of his 450 publications, including over 100 of those regarding the chemistry of resins.

- Untersuchungen über das Chlorophyll (1884) – Investigations of chlorophyll.
- Grundlagen der Pharmakognosie (with Friedrich August Flückiger, Berlin 1885) – Fundamentals of pharmacognosy.
- Angewandte Pflanzenanatomie (Vienna and Leipzig 1889) – Applied plant anatomy.
- Untersuchungen über die Sekrete (1890 to 1899) – Investigations of secretions.
- Indische Heil- und Nutzpflanzen (1892) – Indian medicinal and useful plants.
- Das Kupfer, vom Standpunkte der gerichtl. Chemie, Toxikologie und Hygiene (Stuttgart 1893) -- Copper, from the standpoint of chemistry, toxicology and hygiene. Digital edition by the University and State Library Düsseldorf
- Anatomischer Atlas der Pharmakognosie (with Otto Österle, 1893) – Anatomical atlas of pharmacognosy.
- Beziehungen des Chlorophylls zum Blutfarbstoff (1896) – Relationships of chlorophyll to hemoglobin.
- Versuch einer Theorie der organischen Abführmittel, welche Oxymethylanthrachinone enthalten (1898) – Theory of organic laxatives which contain oxymethylanthrachinone.
- Die Harze (1899) –- Resins.
- Anatomischer Atlas der Pharmakognosie und Nahrungsmittelkunde: (with 81 tables- Leipzig: Tauchnitz, 1900). – Anatomical atlas of pharmacognosy and "food science". Digital edition by the University and State Library Düsseldorf
- Die Harze und die Harzbehälter mit Einschluss der Milchsäfte (second edition, 1906)
- Handbuch der Pharmakognosie. (volume 1–[4]. Leipzig, Tauchnitz 1909–1927) – Textbook of Pharmacognosy.
- Terminologie und Systematik im pharmakochemischen Systeme der Drogen, speziell in der Kohlehydrat-o gruppe ([S.l.] 1911) Digital edition by the University and State Library Düsseldorf
- Les Problèmes modernes de la Pharmacognosie ([S.l.] 1911) Digital edition by the University and State Library Düsseldorf
- Erlebtes und Erstrebtes: Lebenserinnerungen. (Bonn, 1921) – memoirs.
