= Mecon (mythology) =

Lover of Demeter in Greek mythology

In Greek mythology, Mecon (in Ancient Greek Μήκων, Mḗkо̄n, meaning "poppy"), also spelled Mekon, was a beautiful young Athenian man, loved by the goddess Demeter who was transformed into a poppy.

== Mythology ==
The handsome Mecon became the lover of the agricultural goddess Demeter. He was transformed into a poppy flower at some point for his own preservation. Demeter was greatly associated with poppies, the flower seen as one of her symbols.

== See also ==
- Smilax
- Hyacinthus
- Crocus
- Clytie
