= Friedrich August Flückiger =

Swiss pharmacist, chemist and botanist (1828–1894)

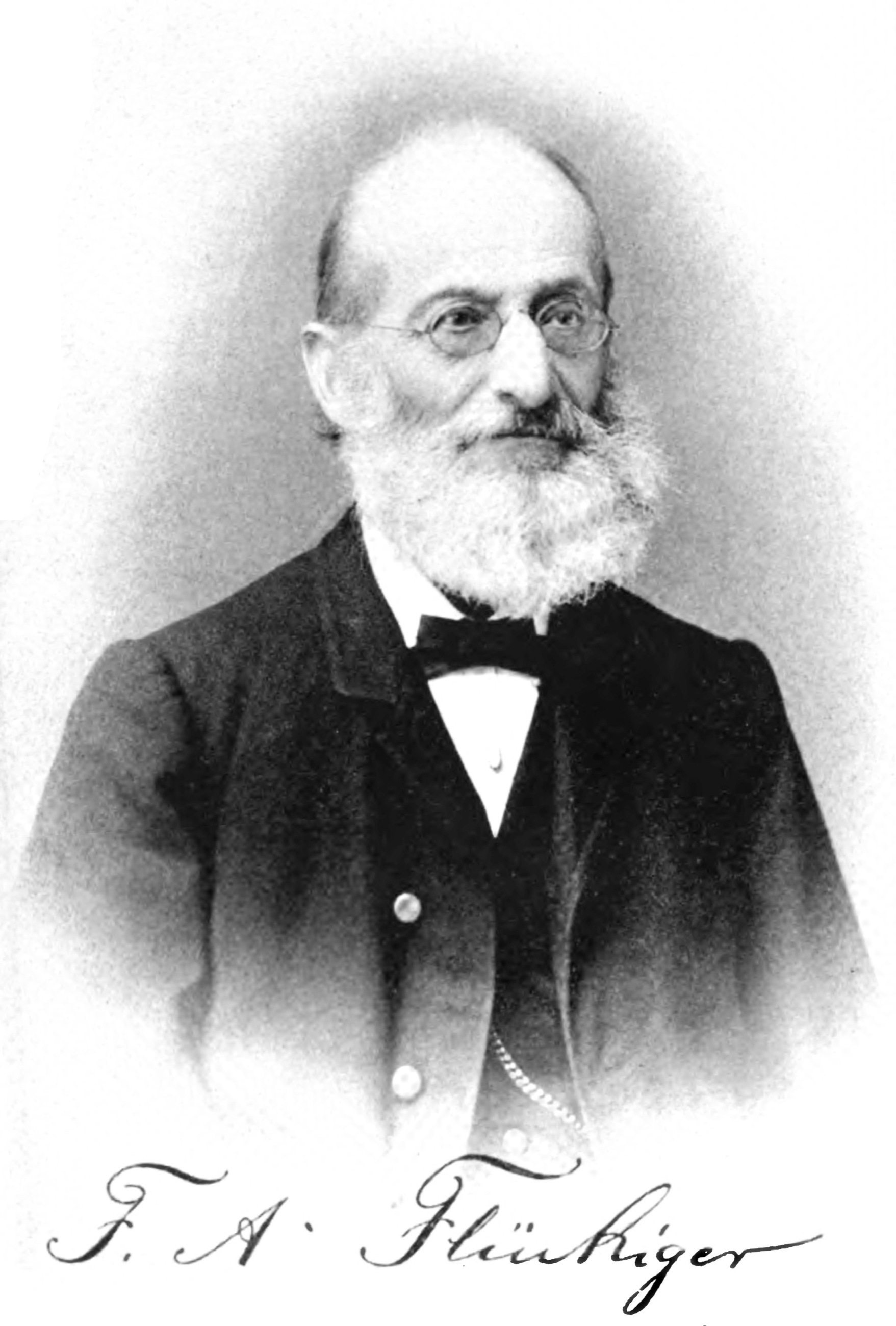
Friedrich August Flückiger (1828-1894)

Friedrich August Flückiger (also spelled Flueckiger; 15 May 1828 - 11 December 1894) was a Swiss pharmacist, chemist and botanist. He was born on 15 May 1828, in Langenthal, canton of Bern.

Flückiger studied chemistry at the University of Berlin (1845–47), afterwards teaching pharmacy classes in Solothurn. In 1850 he studied botany at the University of Geneva, followed by studies at the University of Heidelberg. He was the author of the botanical name Boswellia sacra, a tree native to Somalia, Oman, and Yemen that is a major source of frankincense.

From 1853 to 1859, Flückiger was director of Grosse Apotheke, a pharmacy he owned in Burgdorf. In 1870 he became an associate professor of pharmacy and pharmacognosy at the University of Bern, and from 1873 to 1892 was a professor of pharmacy in Strassburg.

From 1857 to 1866 Flückiger was president of the Schweizerischen Apothekervereins (Swiss Pharmacists Association). During his career he obtained honorary doctorates from the Universities of Bologna and Erlangen.

Flückiger was the author of about 300 scientific works, and along with contributions made in chemistry and pharmacognosy, is remembered for his pioneer investigations in the field of pharmaceutical history. He is credited for providing important input to the second edition of the "Pharmacopoeia Helvetica" (1872).

The Flückiger medal was established at his retirement in 1892 by friends and admirers, who invested a fund intended to be used "for the advancement of pharmacy in its broadest sense". This fund is awarded every 5 years, alternatively by the German Association of pharmacists and its Swiss counterpart. The first three recipients were Edward Morell Holmes (1897), Schmidt (professor at the University of Marburg, 1902) and Édouard Heckel (1907). Flückiger died on 11 December 1894 in Bern, Switzerland.

== Written works ==
- Beiträge zur altern Geschichte der Pharmacie in Bern, 1862
- "Pharmacographia; a history of the principal drugs of vegetable origin, met with in Great Britain and British India" (19 editions published between 1874 and 1986 in English).
- Documente zur Geschichte der Pharmacie, 1876
- Pharmaceutische Chemie, 1879 (Vol.1&2) Digital edition by the University and State Library Düsseldorf
- Pharmakognosie des Pflanzenreiches, 1883
- Grundlagen der Pharmakognosie, 1884, with Alexander Tschirch (1856-1939).
- The Chinona Barks : Pharmacognostically Considered. With 8 lithographic plates and one wood-cut . Blakiston, Philadelphia 1884 Digital edition by the University and State Library Düsseldorf
- "The principles of pharmacognosy; an introduction to the study of the crude substances of the vegetable kingdom" (5 editions published between 1885 and 1887 in English and German).
- "Reactions. A selection of organic chemical preparations important to pharmacy in regards to their behavior to commonly used reagents" (1893 in English).
- Grundriss der Pharmakognosie . Gaertner, Berlin 2. Aufl. 1894 Digital edition by the University and State Library Düsseldorf.
