= Smilax (mythology) =

Greek mythology figure transformed into a bindweed shrub

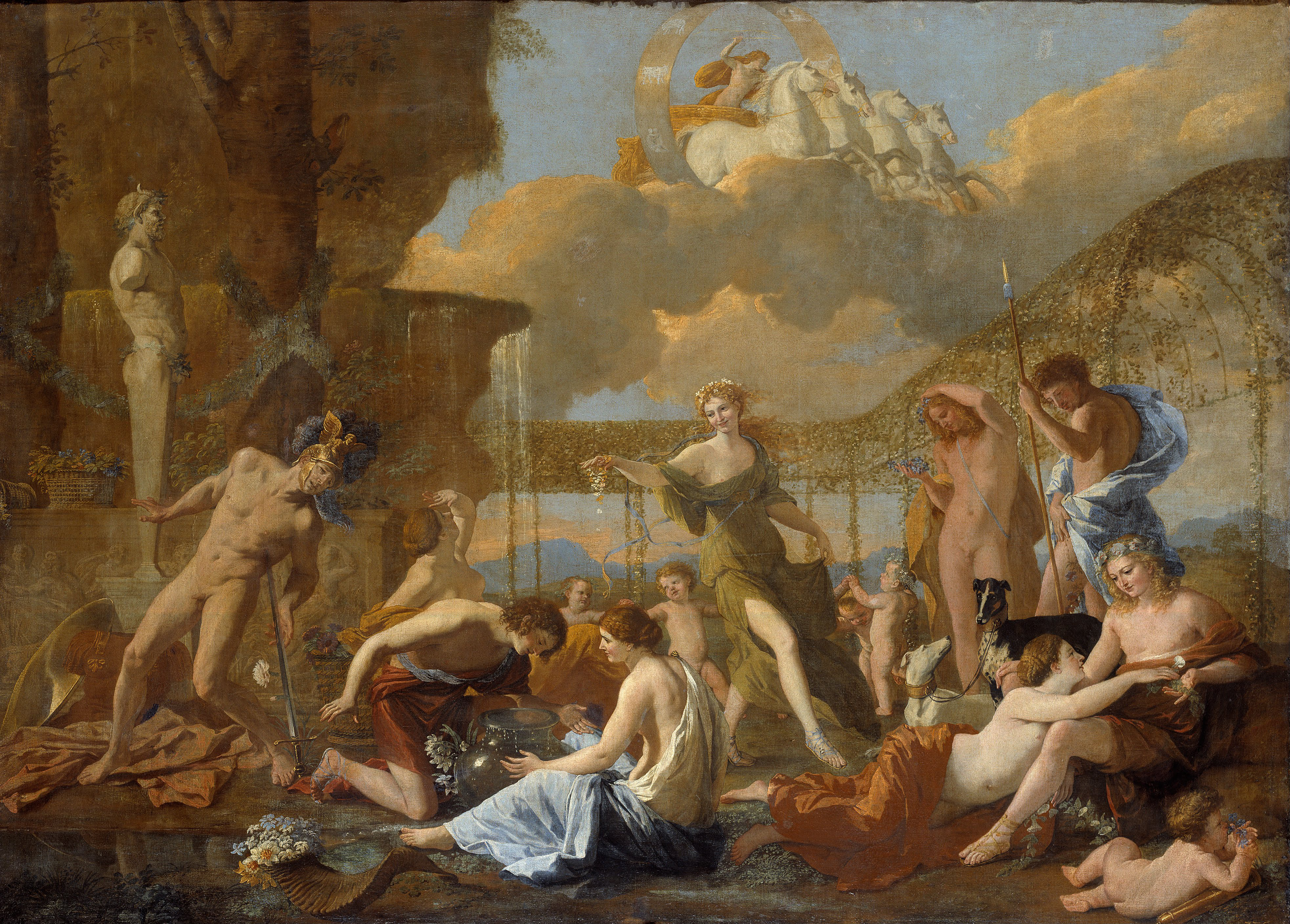
Crocus and Smilax, detail from The Empire of Flora by Nicolas Poussin. Oil-on-canvas painting, 1631.

In Greek mythology Smilax (/smɪ.lɑːks/; Greek pronunciation: [zmîːlaks]; Ancient Greek: Σμῖλαξ, romanized: Smílax, lit. 'bindweed') was the lover of Crocus and was turned into the plant bearing her name (the bindweed). Ancient sources with information about her and her tale are few and far between.

== Etymology ==
Variants of the word σμίλαξ include μῖλαξ, milax, and (σ)μῖλος, (s)milos, which point to a pre-Greek origin for the noun according to Robert Beekes.

== Mythology ==
Details of her story are vague and sparse. Pliny writes that Smilax was turned into bindweed shrub for loving the young Crocus. Ovid writes that the smilax and crocus both tell a love story, and Nonnus also mentions Crocus' love for Smilax, the "airgarlanded girl".

== See also ==
- Amaracus
- Clytia, another nymph turned into plant out of unfulfilled love.
- Myrsine
