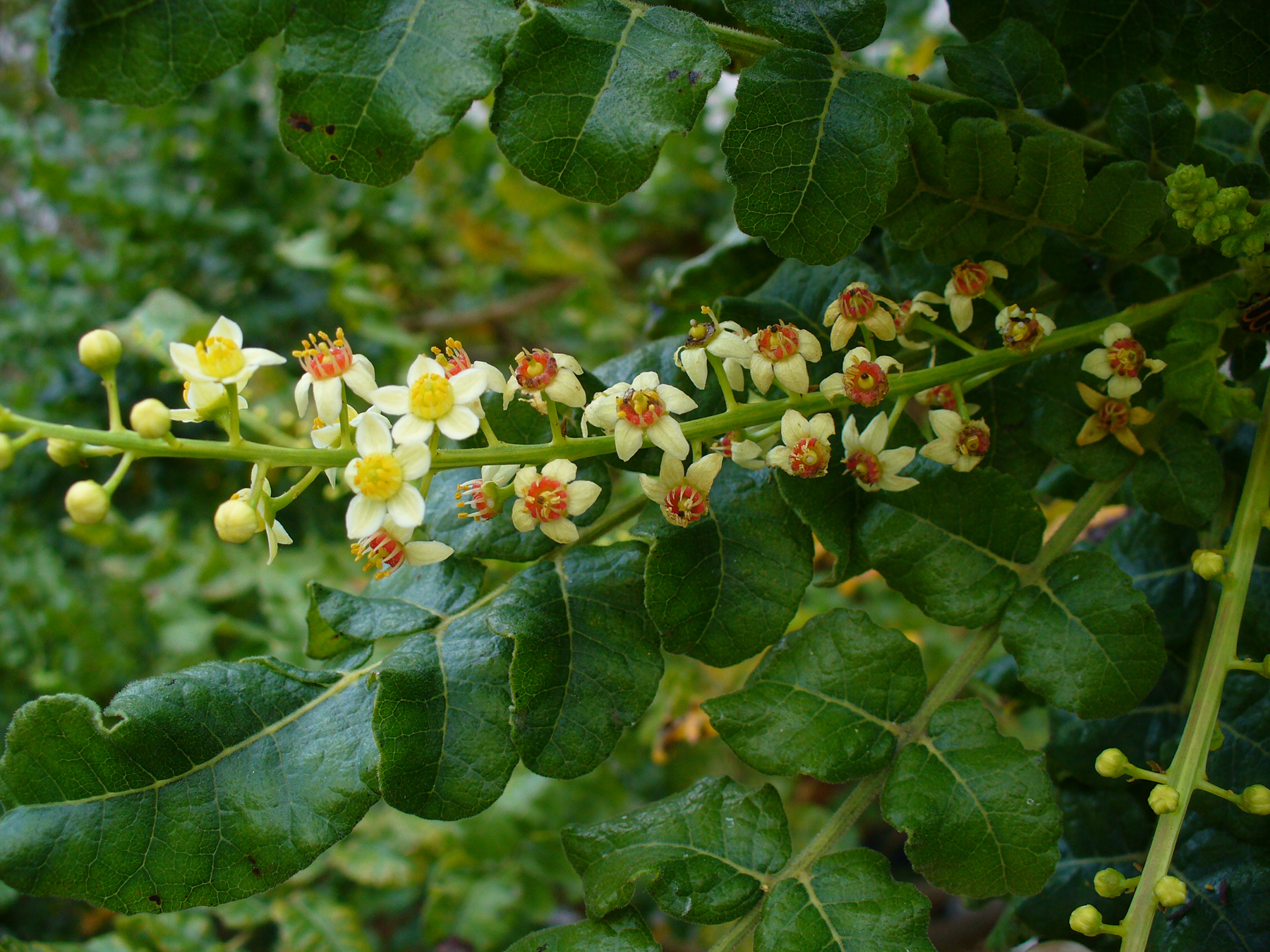

Conservation status
- Near Threatened (IUCN 2.3)

Scientific classification
- Kingdom: Plantae
- Clade: Embryophytes
- Clade: Tracheophytes
- Clade: Spermatophytes
- Clade: Angiosperms
- Clade: Eudicots
- Clade: Rosids
- Order: Sapindales
- Family: Burseraceae
- Genus: Boswellia
- Species: B. sacra

Binomial name
- Boswellia sacra Flueck.

Synonyms
- Boswellia bhaw-dajiana Birdw.; Junipera lycia L.; B. bhaw-dajiana var. serrulata Engl.; B. carteri Birdw.; B. carteri var. subintegra Engl.; B. carteri var. undulatocrenata Engl.; B. undulatocrenata (Engl.) Engl.

= Boswellia sacra =

Species of tree

Boswellia sacra, also known as Boswellia carteri and others, and commonly called the frankincense tree or the olibanum tree, is a tree in the genus Boswellia, in the Burseraceae family, from which frankincense, a resinous dried sap, is harvested. The olibanum tree is a plant native to the countries of Oman and Yemen, in the south of the Arabian Peninsula, and to Somalia and Ethiopia, in the Horn of Africa. In 2012, it was replanted in Israel in the Middle East, 1,500 years after dying out there.

== Description ==
The Boswellia sacra species is a small deciduous tree that grows to a height of 2 to 8 m (6 ft 7 in to 26 ft 3 in), with one or more trunks. The bark has the texture of paper and can be easily removed. The tree has compound leaves and an odd number of leaflets that grow opposite to one another; the small, yellow-white flowers are gathered in axillary clusters composed of five petals, ten stamens, and a cup with five teeth; new leaves feature a downy covering.

The fruit of the Boswellia sacra tree is a capsule approximately 1 cm (0.39 in) long. On a steep slope, individual Boswellia sacra trees usually develop buttress roots that extend from the roots up into the base of the stem, which forms a cushion that adheres to the rock and ensures the stability of the tree.

== Occurrence and habitat ==
B. sacra tolerates the most critical situations and often grows on rocky slopes and ravines, up to an elevation of 1,200 m (3,900 ft), mostly in calcareous soil. Boswellia sacra is abundant in Oman in arid woodland, on the steep, escarpment slopes in the mountains of Dhofar, but it is most prevalent in Eastern and northern Somalia.

In Somalia, frankincense is harvested in mainly Bari and in east of Sanaag regions: mountains lying at the east of Bosaso; and west to laasqorey; and calmadow mountain range, a westerly escarpment that runs parallel to the coast; also middle segment of the frankincense-growing escarpment; Karkaar mountains or eastern escarpment, which lies at the eastern fringe of the frankinscence escarpment.

In Dhofar, Oman, frankincense species grow North of Salalah and were traded in the ancient coastal city of Sumhuram, now Khor Rori.

The frankincense also historically occurred in the Judean desert but was extirpated from the region 1500 years ago. However, the tree was reintroduced to Ketura, Israel in December 2012.

== Resin ==
The trees start producing resin when they are about 8 to 10 years old.

The resin is extracted by making a small, shallow incision on the trunk or branches of the tree or by removing a portion of the crust of it. The resin is drained as a milky substance that coagulates in contact with air and is collected by hand.

Growing conditions vary significantly, affecting both tree development and resin produced. Trees in the narrow fog-laden zone where the desert meets Dhofar mountain range, in the desert region of the Najd, grow extremely slowly and produce very high quality resin in large, white clumps. Omanis and other Gulf State Arabs consider this to be superior to all other resins produced in North and Northeast Africa, India, and Asia, and it is priced accordingly. The most widely accepted opinion is that the vast boswellia forests which have existed for millennia in modern day Somalia produce a superior quality resin. Many reports have suggested that there is an existing phenomenon of middle eastern traders reselling the superior Somali product and marketing it as a product grown indigenously in their own respective lands.

== Threats ==
There are many initiatives taken by owners of the lands where Boswellia sacra grows, and organizations like the international banks have invested in harvesting new trees and making protection tools for the regions where the trees are mostly growing. It has helped in the increase of production of the resin.

== In culture ==
According to Greek mythology, the frankincense plant had once been a mortal woman named Leucothoe. The Sun god Helios fell in love with her, and left his previous lover Clytie. In bitterness, Clytie gossiped to Leucothoe's father Orchamus, who buried his daughter alive. Helios arrived too late to save her, but not wanting to leave her rot underneath the soil, turned her into a new tree so that she could still breathe air.

In Christian culture, it is recorded in the Gospel of Matthew that Magi that came to worship Jesus of Nazareth as a child brought gifts: gold, myrrh and frankincense. It is said that the inclusion of frankincense, also called olibanum, was to symbolise the divinity of Jesus.

== Gallery ==
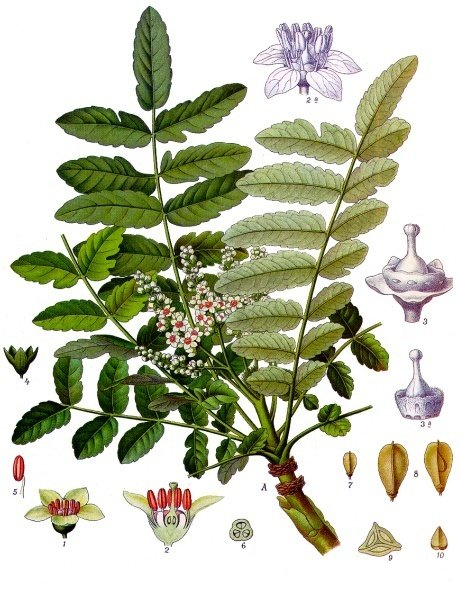
Boswellia sacra illustration

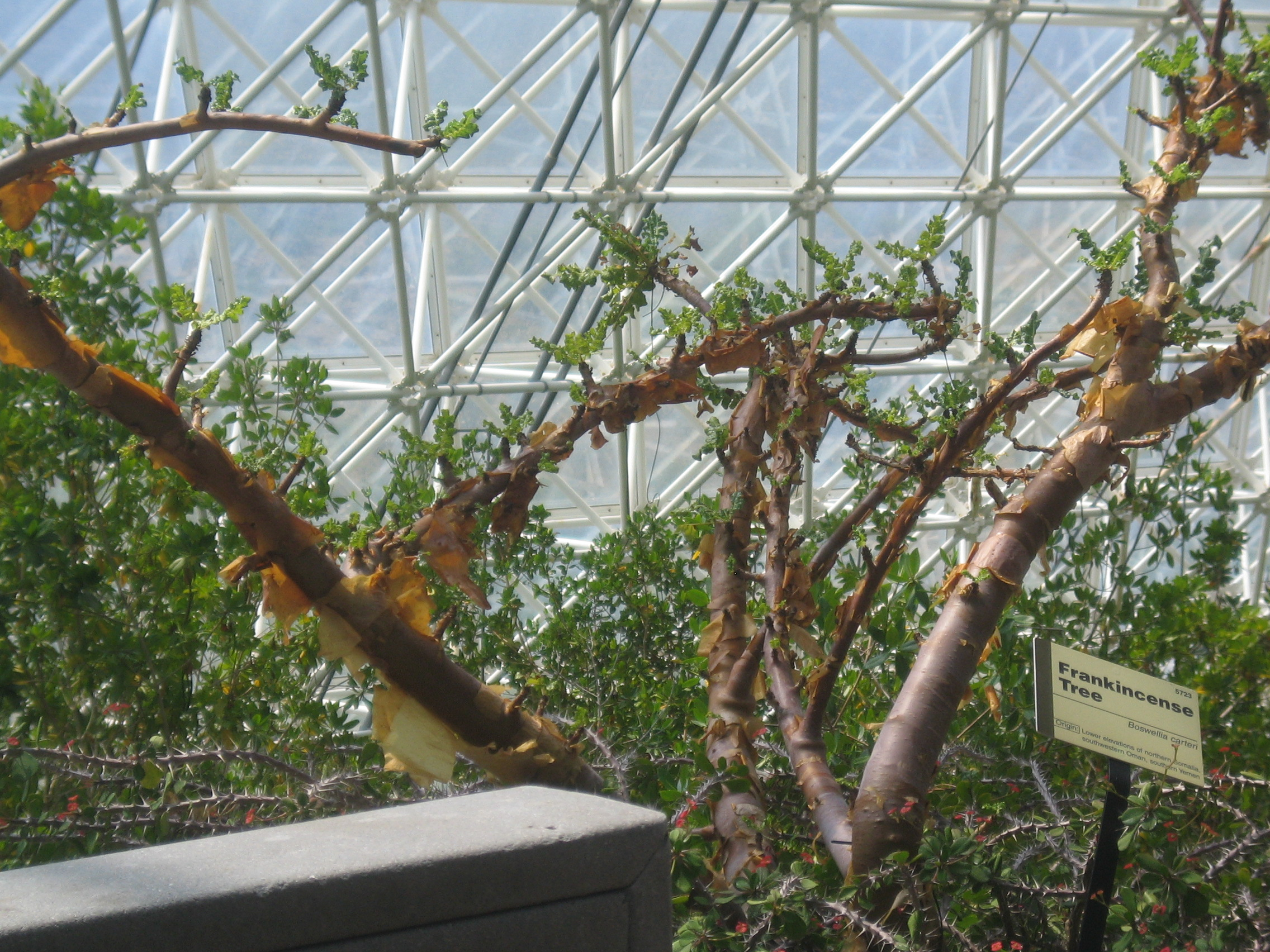
Boswellia sacra inside Biosphere 2
