= Myrmex (Attic woman) =

Greek mythological ant

In Greek and Roman mythology, Myrmex (Note: Servius spells her name 'Myrmix', but the actual ancient Greek word for ant is μύρμηξ, with an eta.) (Ancient Greek: Μύρμηξ, romanized: Múrmēx, lit. 'ant') is a young maiden who became a favourite of the goddess Athena. Her story survives in the works of fifth-century AD Latin grammarian Maurus Servius Honoratus.

== Etymology ==
The ancient Greek noun μύρμηξ means 'ant' and is derived from the Proto-Indo-European root *morwi- which means the same thing.

== Mythology ==
Myrmex was an Attican girl famed for her cleverness and her chastity, and for this reason she was loved by Athena, the virgin goddess of wisdom and patron-goddess of Attica.

When Demeter created crops, Athena wished to show the Atticans an effective way of sowing the fields, so she created the plough, with Myrmex by her side. But Myrmex stole some sheaves of wheat, and boastfully claimed that she herself had invented the plough, and that only through 'her' invention could the crops be put to use. Athena, heartbroken by the girl's betrayal, hated Myrmex as she had once loved her, and turned her into an ant, doomed to only be able to steal crops.

Zeus eventually felt pity for her, so he honoured the ant, and thus when the island of Aegina fell in need to be repopulated, he created a new race of men called the Myrmidons out of ants that he transformed into humans.

== Interpretation ==
The story of the transformation of the Myrmidons is older than that of the girl, and it was probably what prompted the invention of Myrmex's myth in the first place. Meanwhile Athena's worship in Boeotia and Thessaly connected her to the plough and corn.

Due to the language used about Athena loving Myrmex, some have taken it to mean that the myth has homosexual undertones.

== See also ==
- Arachne
- Medusa
- Metamorphoses in Greek mythology
- Myrmidons, ants who became people

== Bibliography ==
- Beekes, Robert S. P. (2010). Lucien van Beek (ed.). Etymological Dictionary of Greek. Leiden Indo-European Etymological Dictionary Series. Vol. ΙΙ. Leiden, the Netherlands: Brill Publications. ISBN 978-90-04-17419-1.
- Bell, Robert E. (1991). Women of Classical Mythology: A Biographical Dictionary. ABC-Clio. ISBN 9780874365818.
- Forbes Irving, Paul M. C. (1990). Metamorphosis in Greek Myths. Clarendon Press. ISBN 0-19-814730-9.
- Maurus Servius Honoratus. In Vergilii carmina comentarii. Servii Grammatici qui feruntur in Vergilii carmina commentarii; recensuerunt Georgius Thilo et Hermannus Hagen. Georgius Thilo. Leipzig. B. G. Teubner. 1881. Online version at the Topos Text Project.
- Liddell, Henry George; Scott, Robert (1940). A Greek-English Lexicon, revised and augmented throughout by Sir Henry Stuart Jones with the assistance of Roderick McKenzie. Oxford: Clarendon Press. Online version at Perseus.tufts project.
- Monaghan, Patricia (December 18, 2009). Encyclopedia of Goddesses and Heroines: Volume 1. ABC-Clio. ISBN 978-0-313-34989-8.
- Smith, William (1873). A Dictionary of Greek and Roman Biography and Mythology. London: John Murray: Spottiswoode and Co. Online version at the Perseus.tufts Project.
- Stanley, Autumn (1995). Mothers and Daughters of Invention: Notes for a Revised History of Technology. New Brunswick, New Jersey: Rutgers University Press. ISBN 0-8135-2197-1.
- Stassinopoulos, Agapi (October 13, 1999). Conversations With the Goddesses. New York, USA: Harry N. Abrams. ISBN 9781556709425.
