= Clytie (Oceanid) =

Nymph in Greek mythology

- Member of the Oceanids
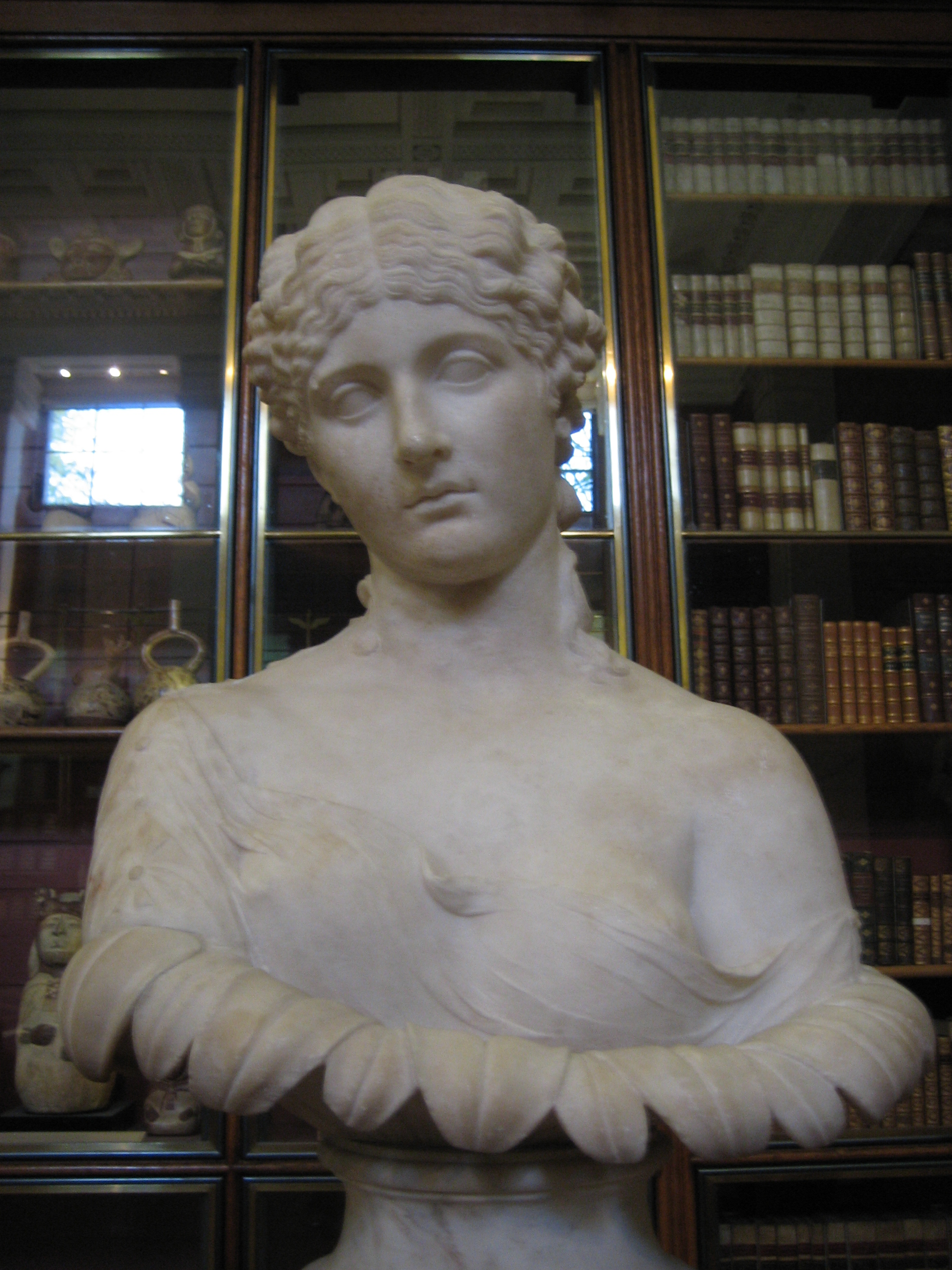
- Townley's Clytie
- Other names: Clytia
- Greek: Κλυτίη
- Abode: Boeotia, others
- Symbols: Heliotropium

Genealogy
- Parents: Oceanus and Tethys or Orchomenus/Orchamus
- Siblings: The Oceanids, the river gods or Leucothoe
- Consort: Helios

Clytie (/ˈklaɪtiiː/; Ancient Greek: Κλυτίη, romanized: Klutíē) or Clytia (/ˈklaɪtiə/; Ancient Greek: Κλυτία, romanized: Klutía, lit. 'renowned') is a water nymph, daughter of the Titans Oceanus and Tethys in Greek mythology. She is thus one of the 3,000 Oceanid nymphs, and sister to the 3,000 river-gods.

According to the myth, Clytie loved the sun-god Helios in vain, but he left her for another woman, the princess Leucothoe, under the influence of Aphrodite, the goddess of love. In anger and bitterness, she revealed their affair to the girl's father, indirectly causing her doom as the king buried her alive. This failed to win Helios back to her, and she was left lovingly staring at him from the ground; eventually she turned into a heliotrope, a violet flower that gazes at the Sun each day in its diurnal journey.

Clytie's story is mostly known from and fully preserved in Ovid's narrative poem Metamorphoses, though other brief accounts and references to her from other authors survive as well.

== Etymology ==
Her name, spelled both Klytie and Klytia (Κλυτίη, Κλυτία), is derived from the ancient Greek adjective κλυτός (klutós), meaning "glorious" or "renowned". That word itself derives from the verb κλύω, meaning 'to hear, to understand', ultimately from the Proto-Indo-European root *ḱlew-, which means 'to hear'.

== Family ==
Although Ovid does not mention Clytie's parentage or homeland (if not Babylon), Hesiod includes her name in his list of the 3,000 Oceanids, daughters of the water deities Oceanus and Tethys, two of the original Titans. Hyginus also gives her the same parentage. Clytie is thus also sister to the 3,000 river-gods. Neither Hesiod nor Hyginus mention the myth concerning Helios, but their figure seems to be identical to Ovid's.

In another narrative that takes place in Boeotia, Clytie is identified as Leucothoe's own sister, and daughter of King Orchomenus, although not by name.

== Mythology ==
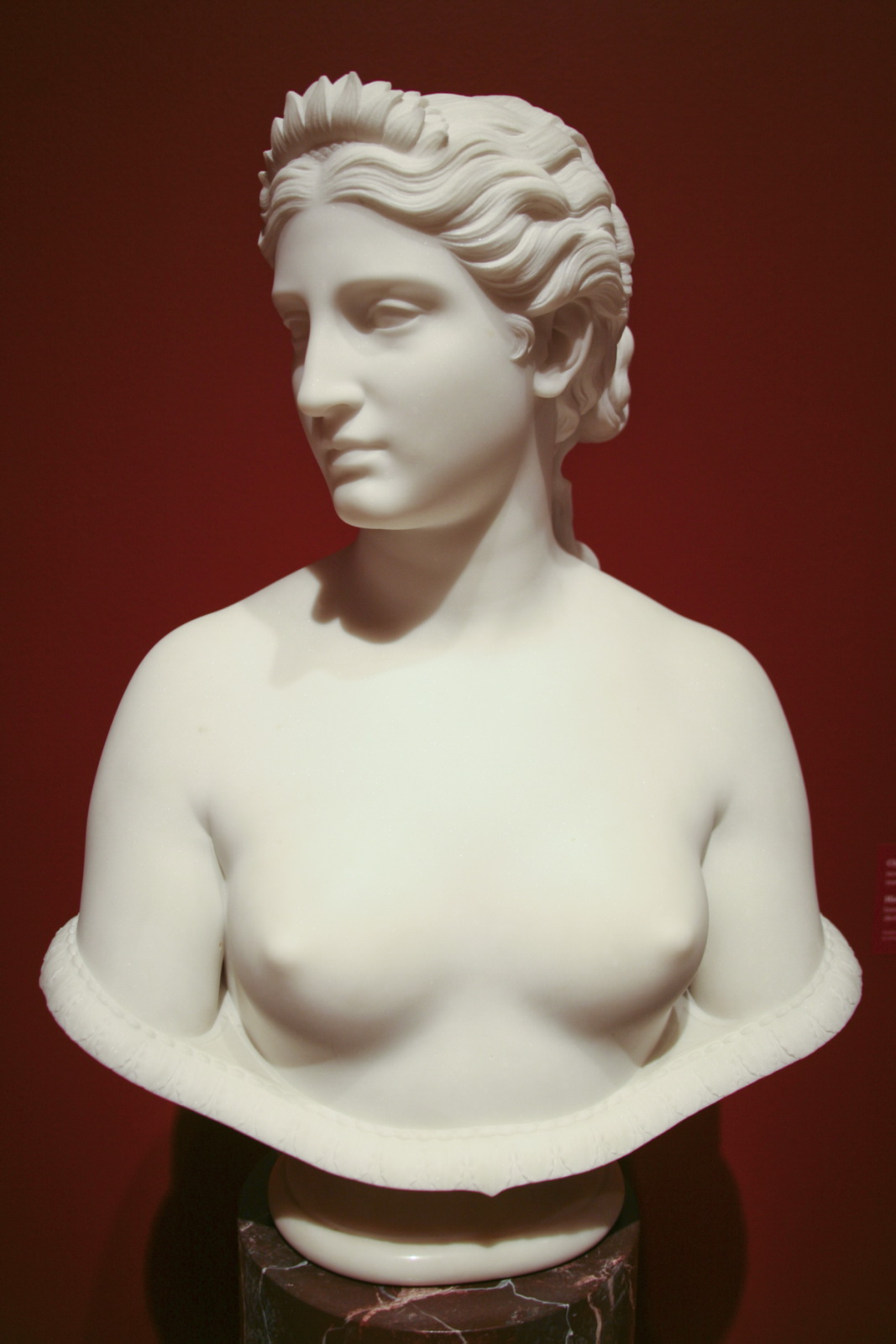
Bust of Clytie, by Hiram Powers, modeled 1865–1867, carved 1873.

=== Ovid ===
Ovid's account of the story is the fullest and most detailed of the surviving ones. According to him, Clytie was a lover of the god of the sun Helios, until Aphrodite made him fall in love with a Persian mortal princess called Leucothoe, in revenge for him informing her husband Hephaestus of her illicit affair with his brother Ares, the god of war. Helios then ceased to care for her, as well as all the other goddesses and nymphs he had loved before, like Rhodos, Perse and Clymene. He abandoned her and preferred to spend his days admiring the princess Leucothoe. Though scorned and deserted, she still sought out his love and warmth. Angered by his treatment of her, and still missing him, she informed Leucothoe's strict father, King Orchamus, about the affair. Since Helios had defiled Leucothoe, Orchamus had her put to death by burial alive in the sands despite the girl's protest and proclaiming of her innocence. Helios arrived too late to save the girl, but he did make sure to turn her into a frankincense tree by pouring nectar over her dead body, so that she would still breathe air (in a certain fashion). Ovid seems to think that Helios bears some responsibility over Clytie's excessive jealousy because he writes that Helios's passion was never "moderate" when he loved her.

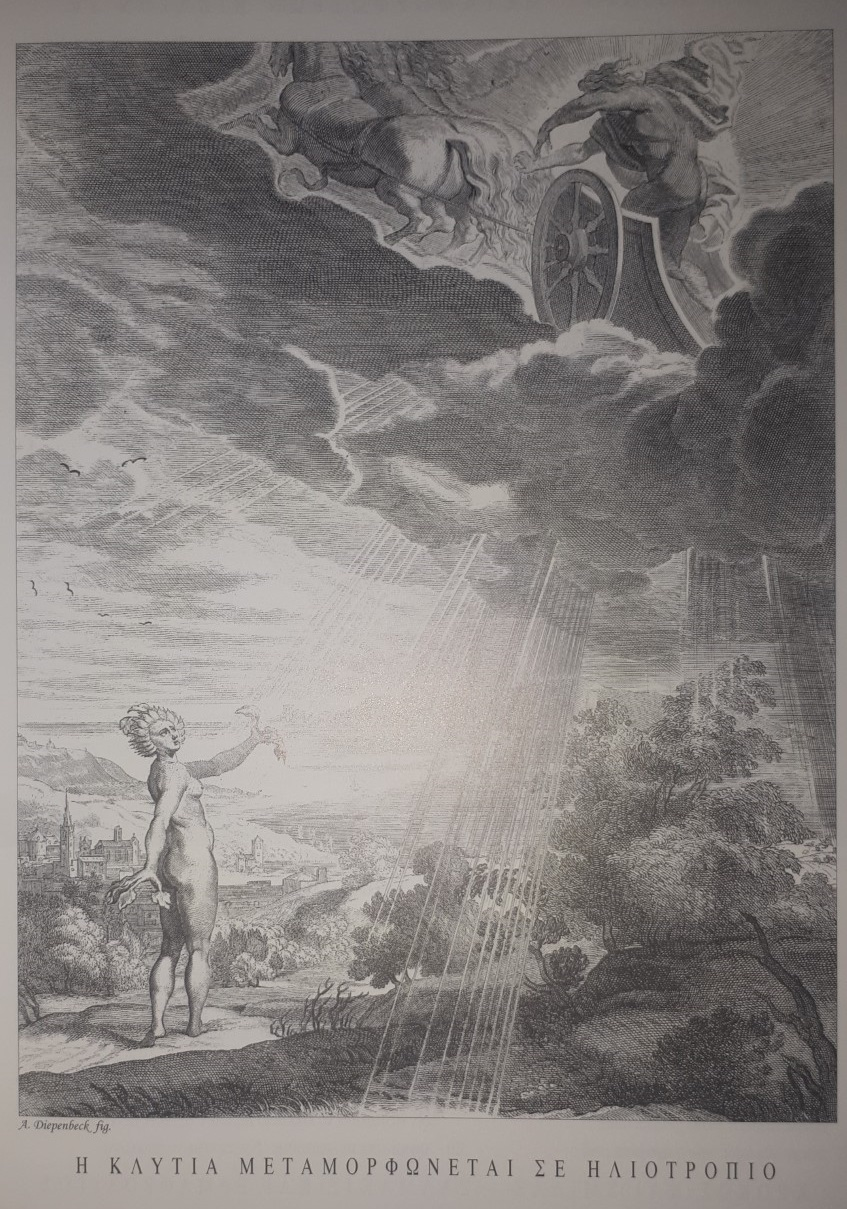
Clytie turns into a sunflower as the Sun refuses to look at her, engraving by Abraham van Diepenbeeck.

Clytie intended to win Helios back by taking away his new love, but her plan backfired on her, and her actions only hardened his heart against her. Thereafter Helios avoided her altogether, never going back to her. In despair, she stripped herself and sat naked, accepting neither food nor drink, for nine days on the rocks, staring at the Sun and mourning his departure, but he never looked back at her. After nine days she was eventually transformed into a purple flower, the heliotrope (meaning "sun-turning"). Also known as the turnsole, it is known for growing on sunny, rocky hillsides. The flower turns its head always to look longingly at Helios the Sun as he passes through the sky in his solar chariot, even though he no longer cares for her, her form much changed, her love for him unchanged.

=== Variations ===
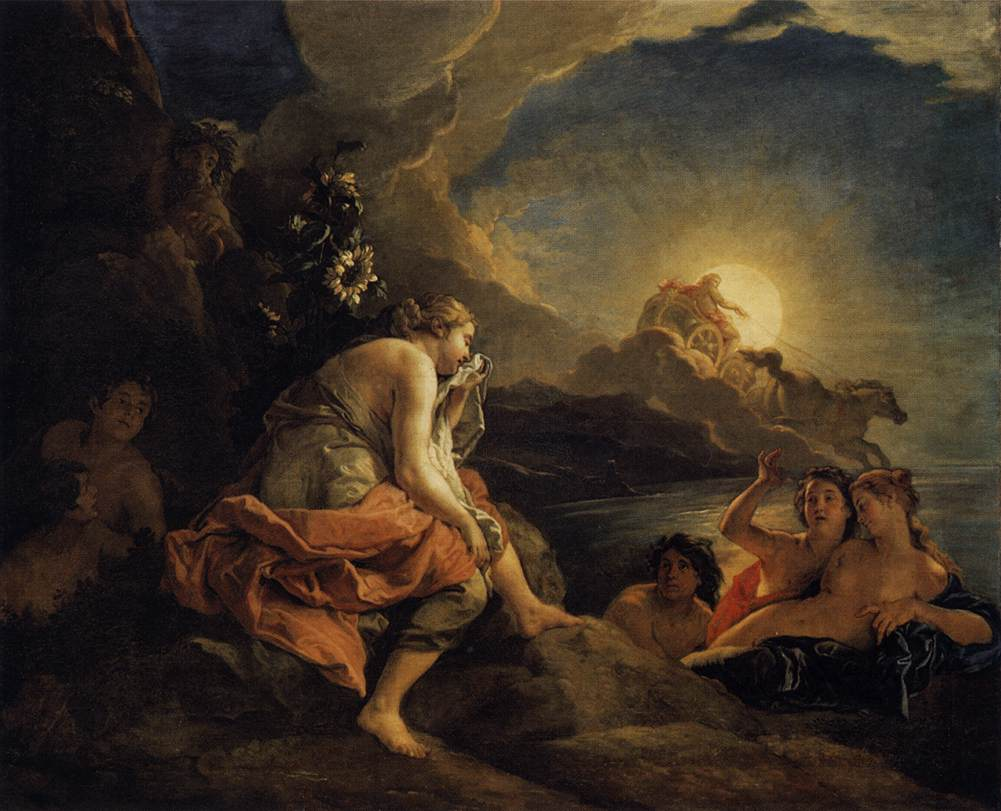
Clytie Transformed into a Sunflower, Charles de la Fosse, oil on canvas, 1688

The episode is most fully told by Roman poet Ovid in his first-century AD poem the Metamorphoses; Ovid's version is the only full surviving narrative of this story, but he must had had a Greek original source, for the myth's origins and plot lie in the etymology of the flower's Greek name. According to Lactantius Placidus, he got this myth from seventh or sixth century BC Greek author Hesiod. Some scholars however doubt this particular attribution to Hesiod. Like Ovid, Lactantius does not explain how Clytie knew about Helios and Leucothoe, or how Helios knew it was Clytie who had informed Orchamus. It is possible that originally the stories of Leucothoe and Clytie were two distinct ones before they were combined along with a third story, that of Ares and Aphrodite's affair being discovered by Helios who then informed Hephaestus, into a single one either by Ovid or Ovid's source.

One of the ancient paradoxographers identifies the girl who betrayed the secret as Leucothoe's sister instead, and their father's name as Orchomenus, but gives her neither a name nor a motivation behind her actions; the mother of the two girls similarly goes unnamed (Eurynome in Ovid), perhaps as a consequence of anonymous' abridged narrative. Orchomenus is also the name of a town in Boeotia, implying that this version of the story took place there rather than Persia. Pliny the Elder wrote that:

I have spoken more than once of the marvel of heliotropium, which turns round with the sun even on a cloudy day, so great a love it has for that, luminary. At night it closes its blue flower as though it mourned.

Edith Hamilton notes that Clytie's case is unique in Greek mythology, as instead of the typical lovesick god being in love with an unwilling maiden, it is a maiden who is in love with an unwilling god.

== Culture ==
Similar to the story of the naiad Daphne used as an explanation for the plant's prominence in worship, Clytie's story might have been used for similar purposes in connecting the flower she turned into, the heliotrope, to Helios.

An ancient scholiast wrote that the heliotropium that Clytie was turned into was the first preservation of the love for the god.

== Modern interpretations ==
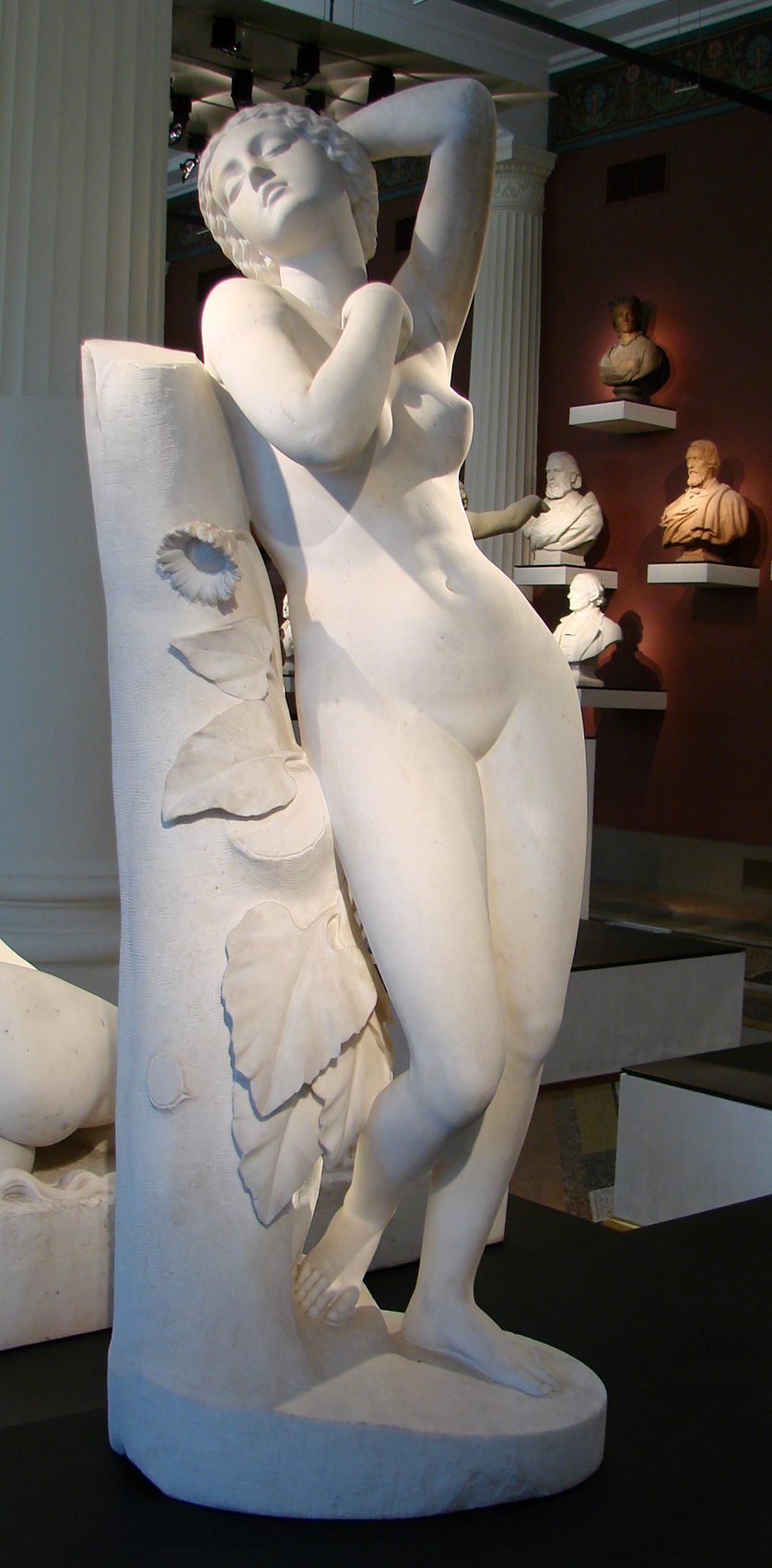
Statue of Clytie (1848), by Joseph-Stanislas Lescorné (1799-1872), Musée de Picardie in Amiens.

=== Identity of the flower ===
Heliotropium flowers

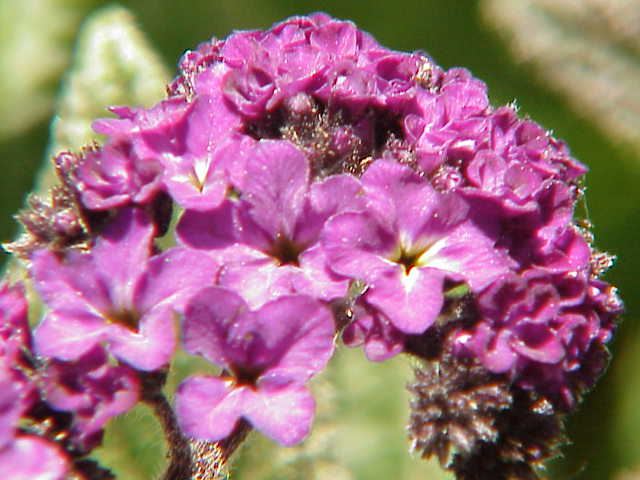
Heliotropium arborescens

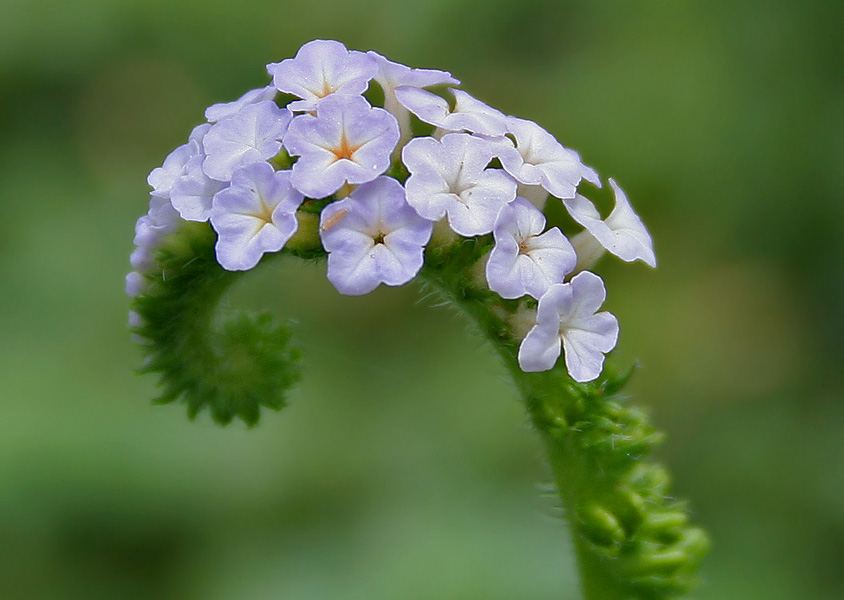
Heliotropium indicum

Modern traditions substitute the purple (Note: In fact, Ovid does not name the flower Clytie turned into, but explicitly describes it as violet in colour.) turnsole with a yellow sunflower, which according to (incorrect) folk wisdom turns in the direction of the sun. The original French form tournesol primarily refers to sunflower, while the English turnsole is primarily used for heliotrope. Sunflowers however are native to North America, and were not found in antiquity in either Greece or Italy, making it impossible for ancient Greek and Roman authors to have included them in their etiological myths, as sunflowers were not part of their native flora and they would have not known about them and their sun-turning properties.

It has also been noted that the heliotropium itself poses some difficulties for identification with Clytie's flower; heliotropium arborescens, which is the vivid purple variant, is not native to Europe either, instead coming from the Americas just like the aforementioned sunflower. Native variants of heliotropium or other flowers called "heliotrope" are also the wrong colour, either white (heliotropium supinum) or yellow (vilossum), when Ovid described it as "like a violet" and Pliny "blue". Both however lived in the post-Hellenistic period after the conquests of Alexander the Great, and could have been aware of the heliotropium indicum, a variant that can have a purplish or bluish corolla. Moreover, even heliotropium europaeum, a variant native in Europe which is normally white in colour, can have pale lilac flowers.

=== Identity of the god ===
Much like with Phaethon, another ancient myth featuring Helios, some modern retellings connect Clytie and her story to Apollo, the god of light, but the myth as attested in classical sources does not actually concern him; Ovid identifies twice the god Clytie fell in love with as Hyperione natus/e (the son of Hyperion), and like other Roman authors does not conflate in his poem the two gods, who remain distinct in myth. Clytie's lover whom she was jilted by is also connected to the story of Phaethon, as the boy's father, a distinctly solar but non-Apolline figure, who in turn is not a sun god or given any solar characteristics as far as Ovid is concerned. Even more so, a passage of the story lists the previous lovers of the sun god, and this passage only includes nymphs linked to Helios such as Rhodos, Circe's mother Perse and Clymene, yet does not include any of Apollo's lovers. Joseph Fontenrose argued that despite Ovid's works being largely responsible for the prevalence of the two gods being the same one in post-classical times, he himself did not actually identify them in either the story of Phaethon or the story of Leucothoe and Clytie.

== Art ==
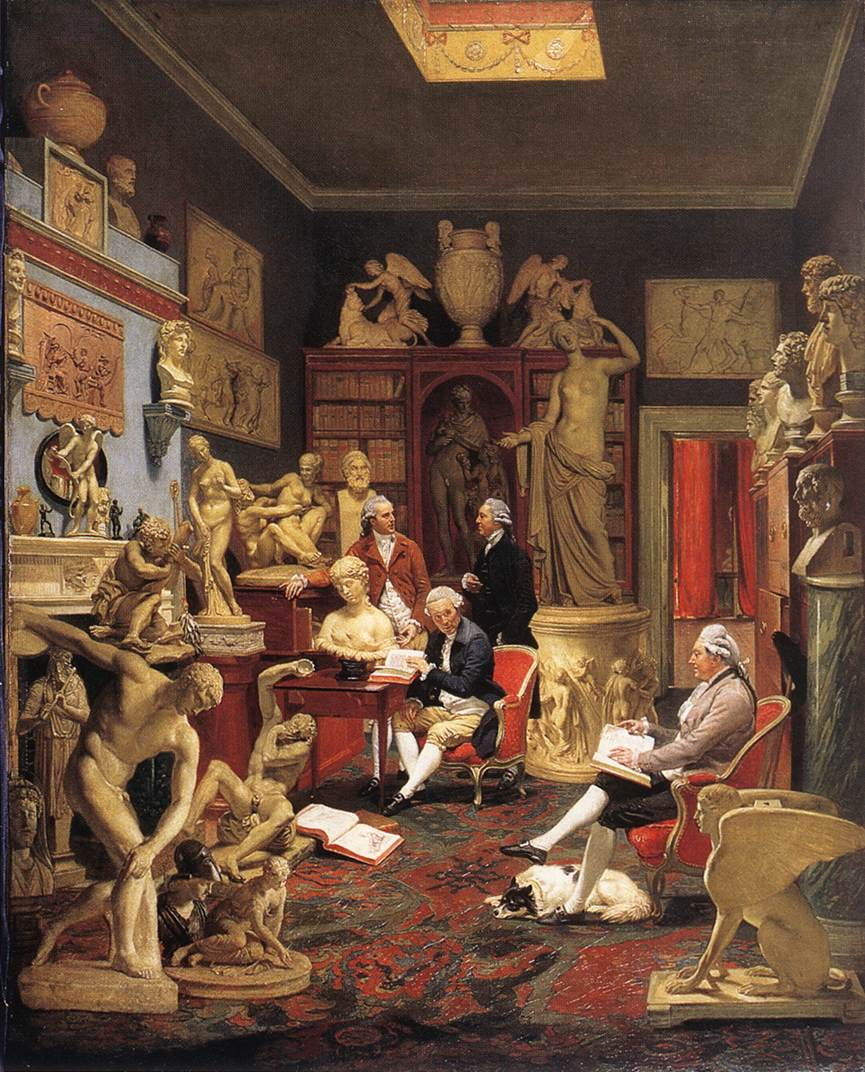
Townley's Bust of Clytie (left, on the table).

=== Bust (Townley collection) ===
One sculpture of Clytie, found in the collection of Charles Townley, might be either a Roman work, or an eighteenth century "fake".

The bust was created between 40 and 50 AD. Townley acquired it from the family of the principe Laurenzano in Naples during his extended second Grand Tour of Italy (1771–1774); the Laurenzano insisted it had been found locally. It remained a favorite both with him (it figures prominently in Johann Zoffany's iconic painting of Townley's library (illustration, right), was one of three ancient marbles Townley had reproduced on his visiting card, and was apocryphally the one which he wished he could carry with him when his house was torched in the Gordon Riots – apocryphal since the bust is in fact far too heavy for that) and with the public (Joseph Nollekens is said to have always had a marble copy of it in stock for his customers to purchase, and in the late 19th century Parian ware copies were all the rage.

The identity of the subject, a woman emerging from a calyx of leaves, was much discussed among the antiquaries in Townley's circle. At first referred to as Agrippina, and later called by Townley Isis in a lotus flower, it is now accepted as Clytie. Some modern scholars even claim the bust is of eighteenth century date, though most now think it is an ancient work showing Antonia Minor or a contemporaneous Roman lady in the guise of Ariadne.

=== Bust (George Frederick Watts) ===
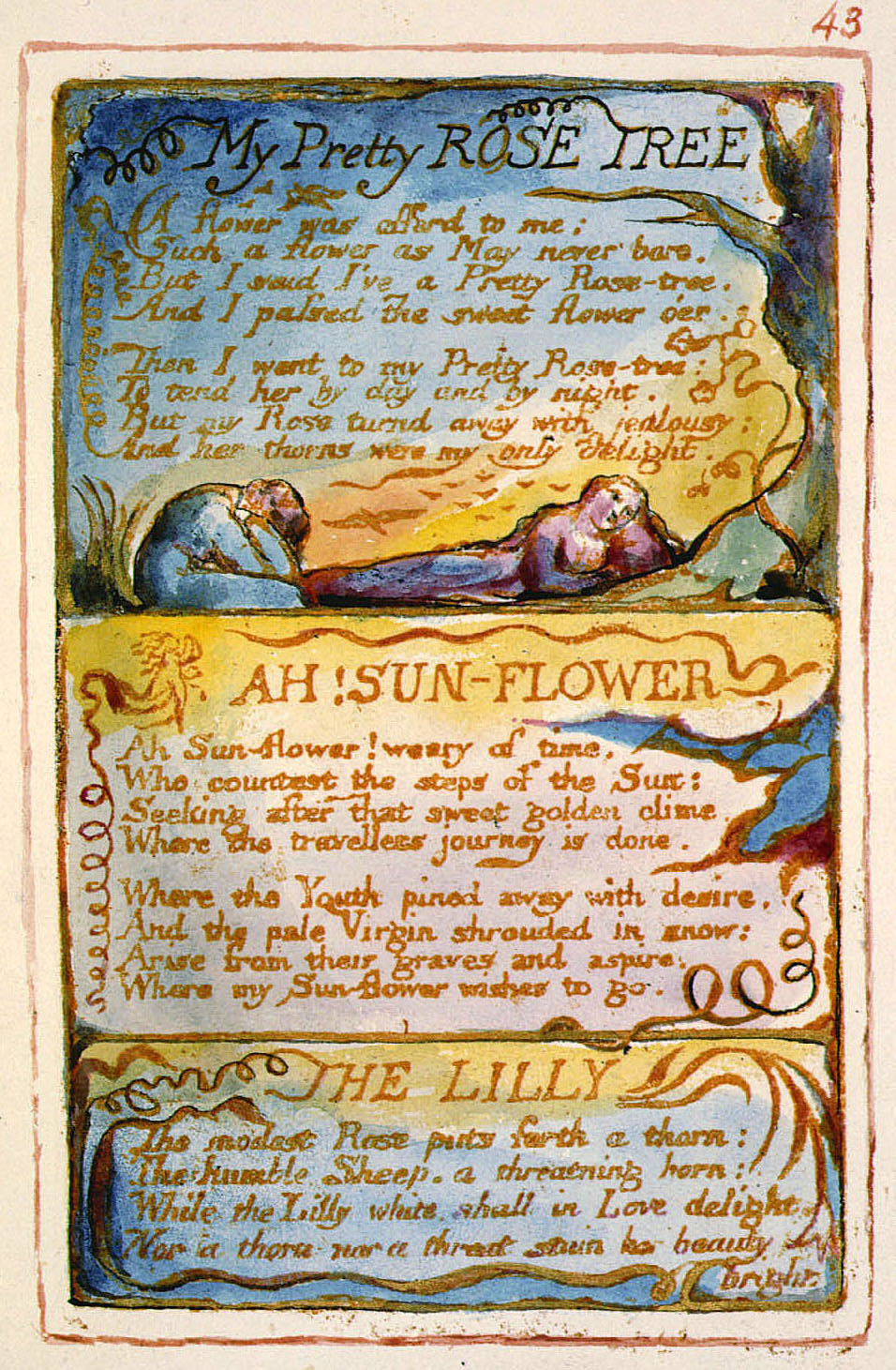
Copy AA of Blake's engraving of the poem in Songs of Experience, now in the Fitzwilliam Museum

Another famous bust of Clytie was by George Frederick Watts. Instead of Townley's serene Clytie, Watts's is straining, looking round at the sun.

=== Literature ===
Clytie is briefly alluded to in Thomas Hood's poem Flowers, in the lines "I will not have the mad Clytie,/Whose head is turned by the sun;". William Blake's poem Ah! Sun-flower has been suggested to allude to the myth of Clytie.

Ah Sun-flower! weary of time,
Who countest the steps of the Sun:
Seeking after that sweet golden clime
Where the travellers journey is done.

Where the Youth pined away with desire,
And the pale Virgin shrouded in snow:
Arise from their graves and aspire,
Where my Sun-flower wishes to go.

The sunflower (which was not Clytie's original flower) ever since her myth, has "been an emblem of the faithful subject", in three or four ways: the "image of a soul devoted to the god or God, originally a Platonic concept", as "an image of the Virgin devoted to Christ"; or "an image - in the strictly Ovidian sense - of the lover devoted to the beloved". Northrop Frye claimed that Clytie's metamorphosis tale is at the 'core' of the poem.

== Gallery ==
Clytie in art

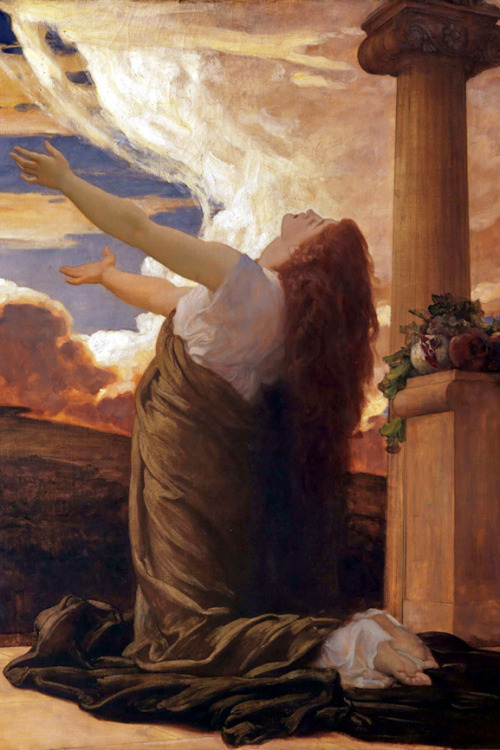
Clytie, by Frederic Leighton

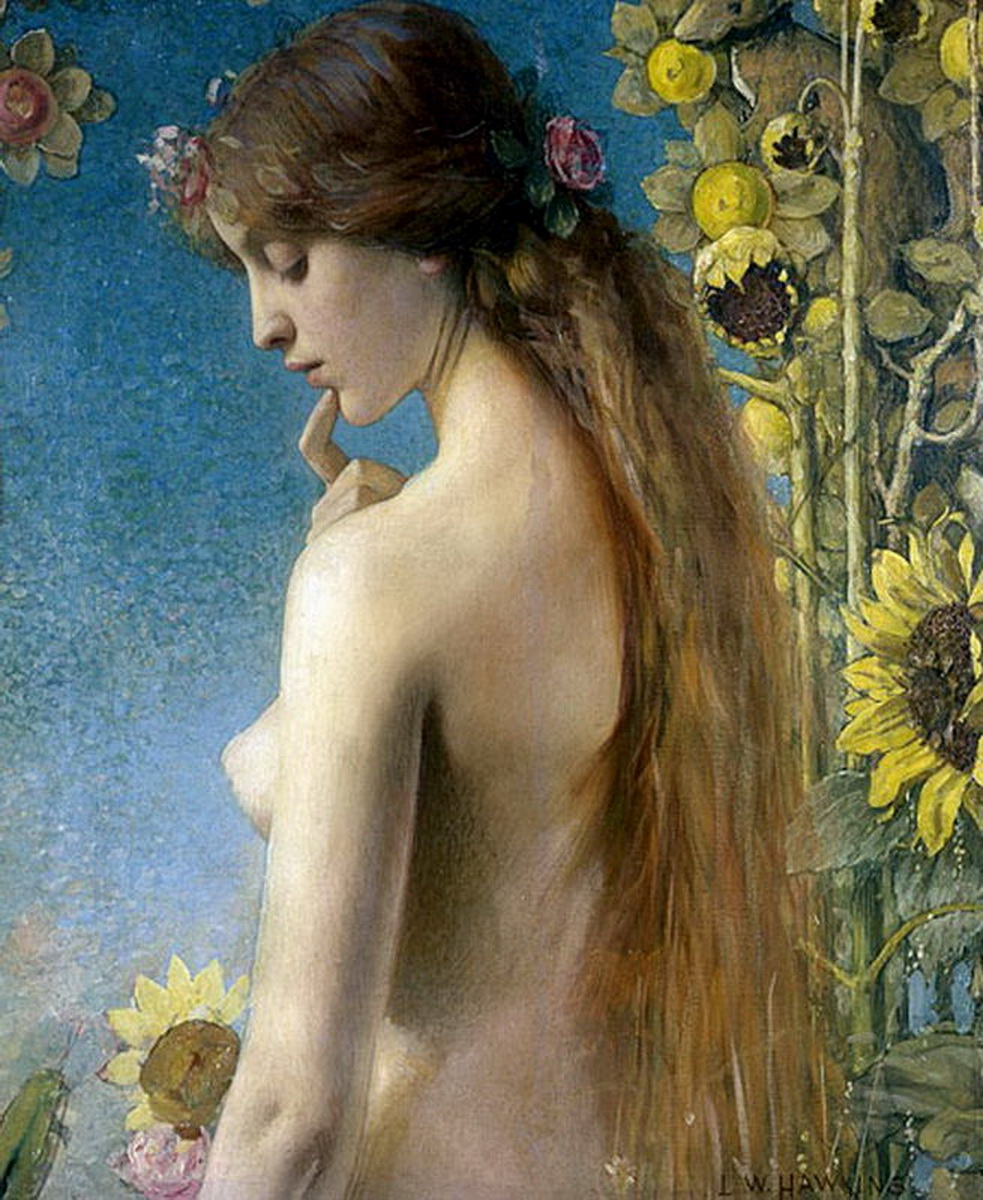
Clytie, by Louis Welden Hawkins.

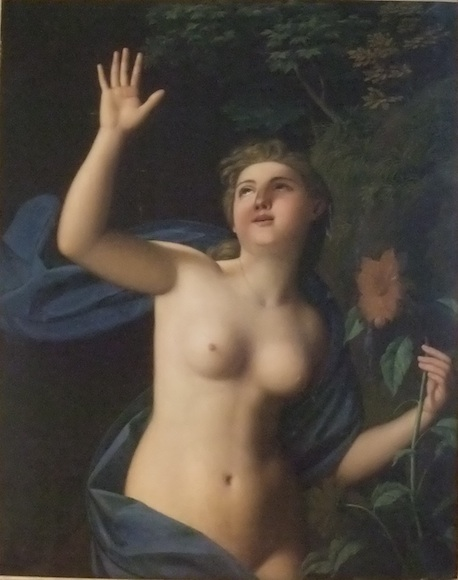
Clytie looking up by Nicolas Colombel

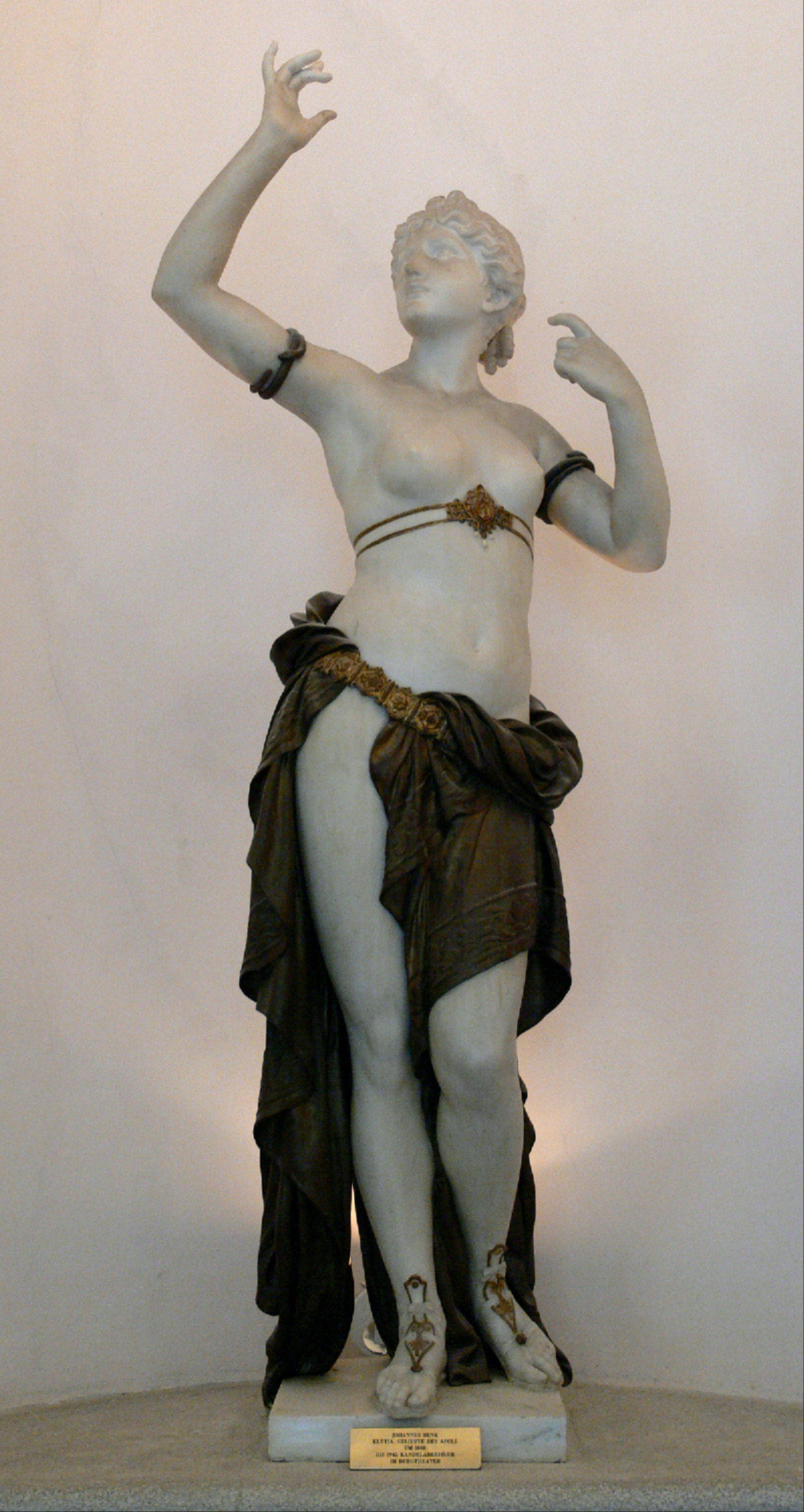
Statue of Clytie by Johannes Benk, Austrian Theatre Museum.

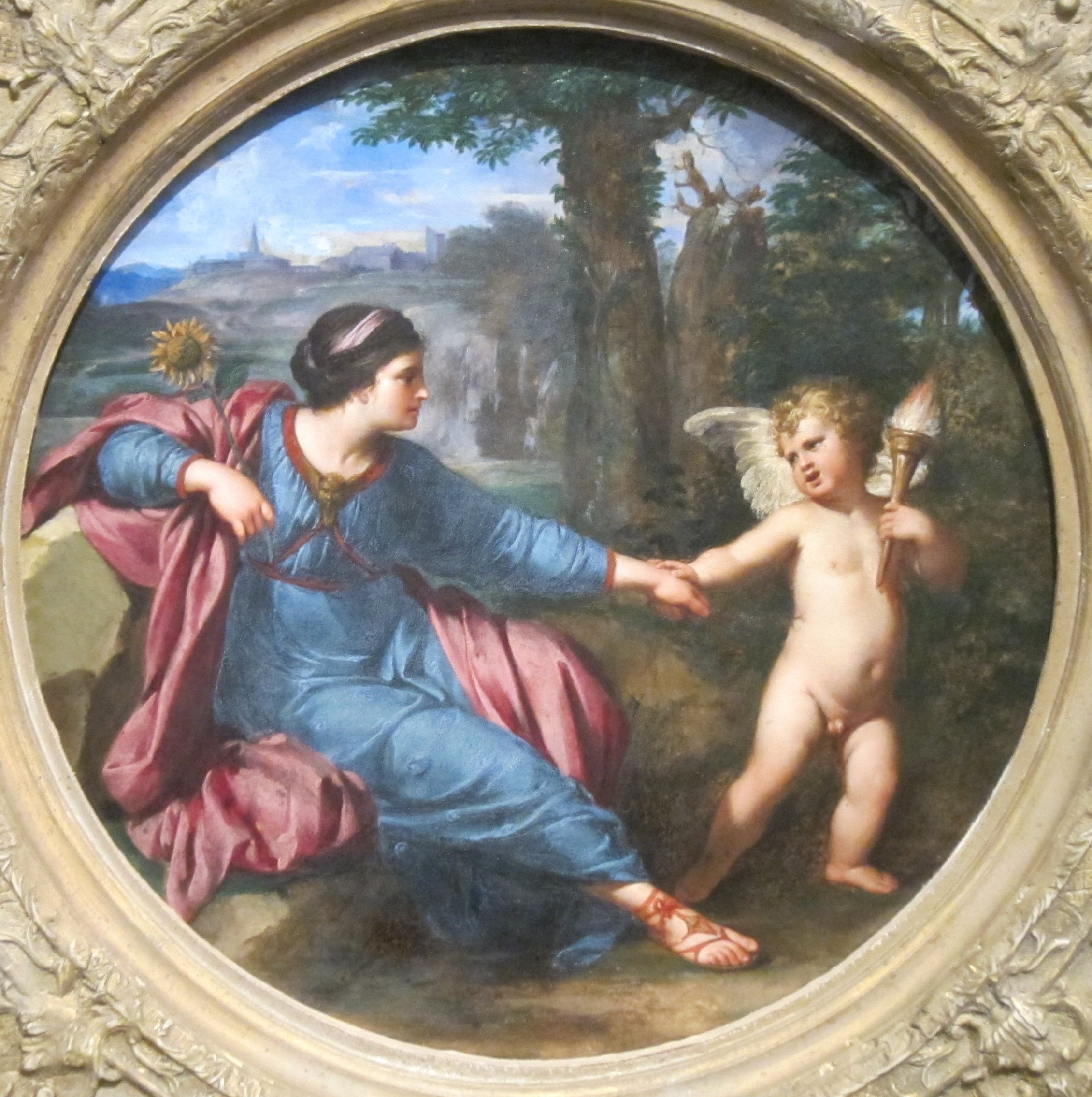
Clytie and Cupid, by a follower of Annibale Carracci.

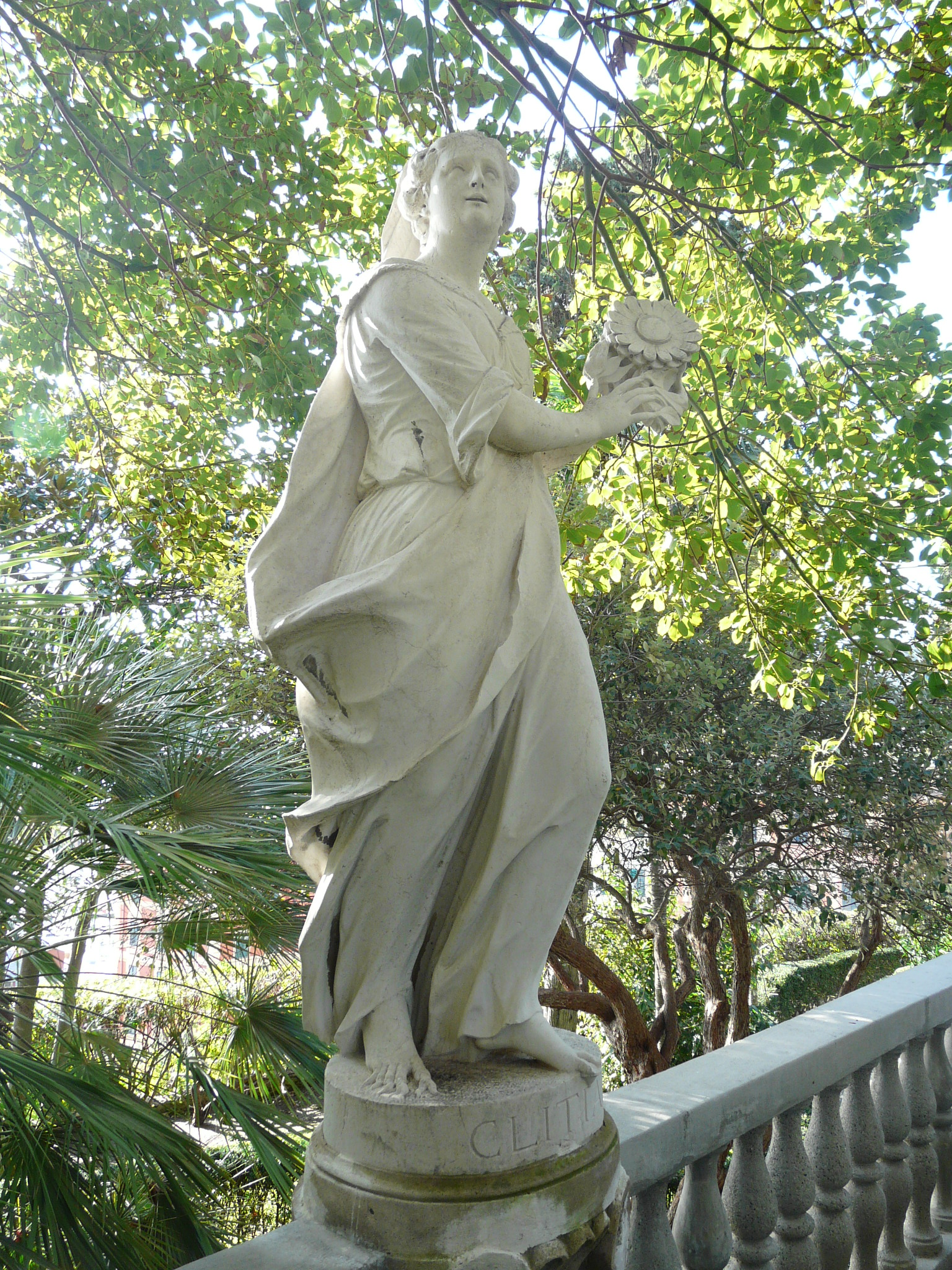
Statue of Clytie in Villa Durazzo Centurione, Italy.

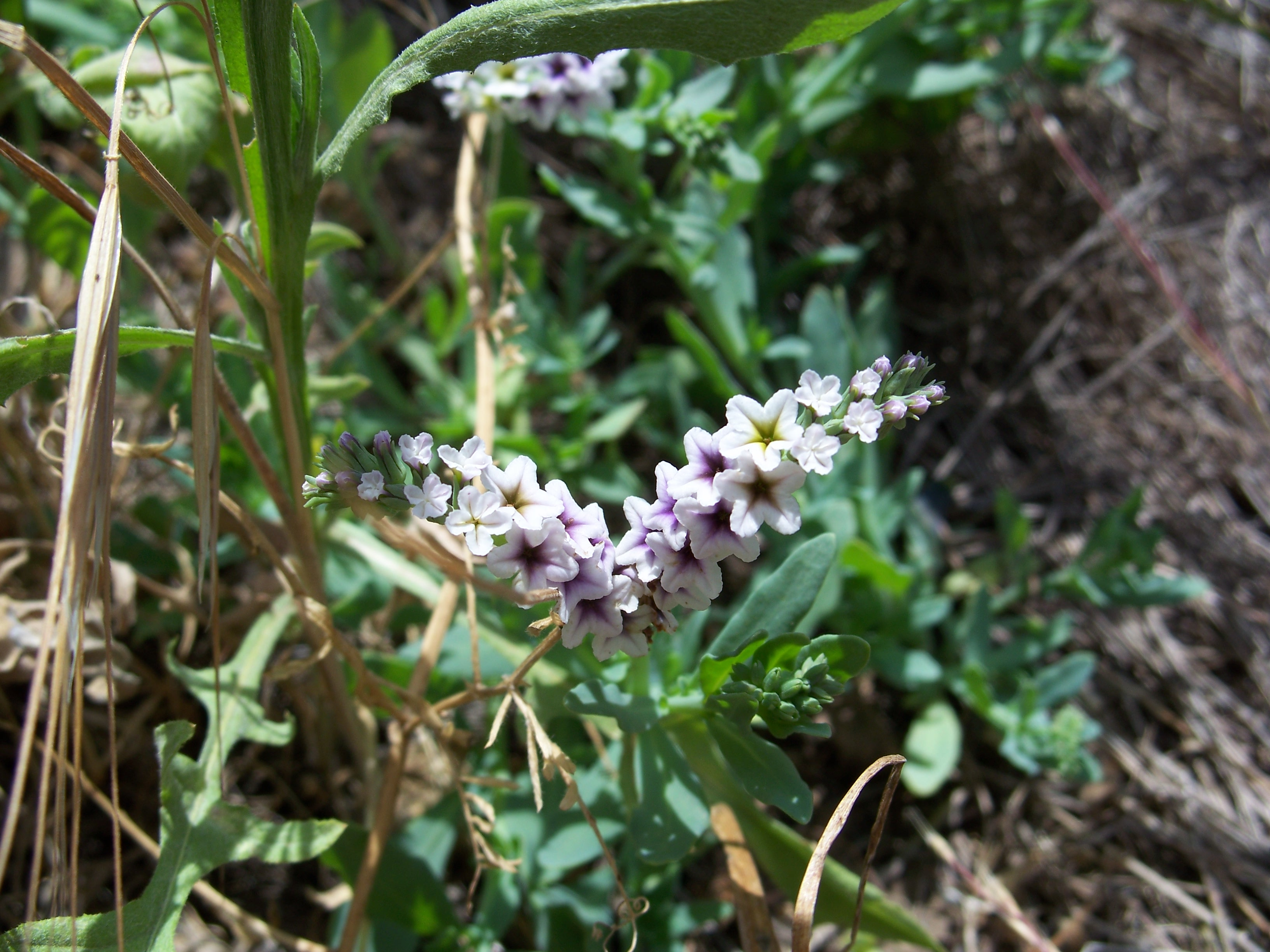
Heliotropium europaeum with lilac blossoms.

== Genealogy ==
Clytie's family tree according to Hesiod

Uranus	Gaia	Pontus
Oceanus	Tethys	Hyperion	Theia	Crius	Eurybia
The Rivers	CLYTIE	Helios	Selene	Eos	Astraeus	Pallas	Perses
The Oceanids
Cronus	Rhea	Coeus	Phoebe
Hestia	Hera	Hades	Zeus	Leto	Asteria
Demeter	Poseidon
Iapetus	Clymene (or Asia)	Mnemosyne	(Zeus)	Themis
Atlas	Menoetius	Prometheus	Epimetheus	The Muses	The Horae

== See also ==
- 73 Klytia, a main-belt asteroid named after this nymph.
- Smilax, another nymph transformed into a plant over love.
- Mecon, a goddess' lover who was transformed into a flower.
- Psalacantha, another nymph transformed into a flower for trying to separate a god from his mortal lover.
- Heliotrope (color), a shade of purple
- Acantha
