= Myrina (priestess) =

Greek mythological figure

In Greek mythology, Myrina or perhaps more correctly Myrtea (Note: As Richard E. Pepin notes, the actual Greek word for the myrtle plant is 'Myrtea', but the ancient text definitely writes 'Myrina'.) (Ancient Greek: Μυρτέα, romanized: Murtéa, lit. 'myrtle') is a minor mythological figure, a young priestess connected to myrtle and Aphrodite, the goddess of beauty and love. Her story is attested in the works of two authors; Maurus Servius Honoratus, a Latin grammarian who lived during the early fifth century AD, and the anonymous second Vatican Mythographer, whose work survives in a single manuscript that was found in 1401.

== Etymology ==
Valid spellings of the ancient Greek word for 'myrtle' include μυρσίνη (myrsínē), or μυρρίνη (myrrhínē), masc. μύρρινος (mýrrhinos) for the plant overall and myrtle wreaths, while the berry is μύρτον (mýrton) or μυρτίς (myrtís). It is probably of Semitic origin, but unrelated to the word for myrrh, μύρρα (mýrrha) or σμύρνα (smýrna), despite the resemblance. Robert Beekes suggested a pre-Greek origin due to the myrt-/myrs- variation.

Servius spelled her name as Myrene. As the priestess' story is preserved only in Latin scripts, the original Greek spelling of her name cannot be determined. Greek spellings of 'Myrina' include Μύρινα (Múrina) and Μυρίννα (Murínna).

== Mythology ==
Myrina was an exceedingly beautiful maiden who was kidnapped by robbers and held in a cave while they committed their robberies, but she managed to escape and return to her home. Since she credited the gods for her safety and freedom, she decided to devote herself to Aphrodite, the goddess of love, and became her priestess. But her previous betrothed came to the temple and took her anyway, so she killed him. She was then changed into a myrtle shrub. Because she had been such a loyal priestess, Aphrodite granted pleasant aroma to the myrtle and made it her sacred plant, explaining the myrtle's connection to Aphrodite.

Servius, spelling her name as Myrene, adds that as a priestess, one day she recognised one of her captors among the crowd, and dragged him to the middle of the crowd. The man confessed and gave out the names of his associates. A young man, who had previously loved her, took up the task of hunting down the robbers. When he returned successful, he asked for a reward, and the people of the town allowed him to take Myrene to wife, in spite of her being a priestess. But Aphrodite was displeased to see her priestess break her vows, so she killed him and turned Myrene into myrtle.

== Symbolism ==
The myrtle, which grows by the sea and was seen as appropriate for feminine necessities, was one of the most commons symbols and sacred plants connected to Aphrodite due to its link with her myths and stories, while 'Myrtia' (meaning "she of the myrtle") was one of Aphrodite's many cult titles, as was 'Murcia', meaning the same thing, for her Roman counterpart, the goddess Venus. In ancient Greece dreams about myrtle garlands were seen as auspicious for women due to the myrtle's connection to Aphrodite. The plant was also associated with Hymen, another love god sometimes said to be Aphrodite's son, and the Muse Erato. In the myth of Cupid and Psyche, Venus hits Psyche with a myrtle branch. Myrtle was also worn by her attendants, the Graces.

== See also ==
Other transformations in Greek and Roman mythology:

- Adonis
- Callisto
- Daphne
- Peristera
- Rhodopis and Euthynicus

== Bibliography ==
- Beekes, Robert S. P. (2010). Lucien van Beek (ed.). Etymological Dictionary of Greek. Leiden Indo-European Etymological Dictionary Series. Vol. ΙΙ. Leiden, the Netherlands: Brill Publications. ISBN 978-90-04-17419-1.
- Artemidorus Daldianus (1805). Reiske, Johann Jakob; Reiff, Johann Gottfried; Rigault, Nicolas (eds.). Oneirocritica. Leipzig: Crusius.
- Bell, Robert E. (1991). Women of Classical Mythology: A Biographical Dictionary. ABC-Clio. ISBN 9780874365818.
- Clark, Nora (April 1, 2015). Aphrodite and Venus in Myth and Mimesis. Newcastle upon Tyne, United Kingdom: Cambridge Scholars Publishing. ISBN 978-1-4438-7127-3.
- Cyrino, Monica S (2010). Aphrodite. Gods and Heroes of the Ancient World. New York and London: Routledge. ISBN 978-0-415-77523-6.
- Folkard, Richard (1884). Plant Lore, Legends, and Lyrics: Embracing the Myths, Traditions, Superstitions, and Folk-lore of the Plant Kingdom. Michigan: S. Low, Marston, Searle, and Rivington.
- Forbes Irving, Paul M. C. (1990). Metamorphosis in Greek Myths. Clarendon Press. ISBN 0-19-814730-9.
- Liddell, Henry George; Scott, Robert (1940). A Greek-English Lexicon, revised and augmented throughout by Sir Henry Stuart Jones with the assistance of Roderick McKenzie. Oxford: Clarendon Press. Online version at Perseus.tufts project.
- Maurus Servius Honoratus, In Vergilii carmina comentarii. Servii Grammatici qui feruntur in Vergilii carmina commentarii; recensuerunt Georgius Thilo et Hermannus Hagen. Georgius Thilo. Leipzig. B. G. Teubner. 1881. Online version at the Perseus Digital Library.
- Pepin, Ronald E. (2008). The Vatican Mythographers. New York City: Fordham University Press. ISBN 978-0-8232-2892-8.
- Skinner, Charles M. (1911). Myths and Legends of Flowers, Trees, Fruits and Plants. Read Books Ltd. ISBN 9781447497790.
- Tinkle, Theresa (June 1, 1996). Medieval Venuses and Cupids: Sexuality, Hermeneutics, and English Poetry. California, USA: Stanford University Press. ISBN 0804725152.
