= Orchamus =

In Ovid's, Metamorphoses, Orchamus (Ancient Greek: Ορχάμος) was a king of Persia ("in the land of spices").

== Family ==
Orchamus was the seventh in line from Belus and the father of Leucothoe who was a lover of Helios the Sun.

== Mythology ==
Helios disguised himself as Leucothoe's mother, Eurynome, to gain entrance to her chambers. Clytia, a previous lover of Helios, consumed with jealousy, told Orchamus of his daughter's affair. So Orchamus, "fierce and merciless" buried Leucothoe alive. She died before Helios could save her, and he turned her into a frankincense tree. Clytia, scorned by Helios, sat on the ground pining away, neither eating nor drinking, constantly turning her face toward the Sun, until finally she became the heliotrope, whose flowers follow the Sun across the sky every day.
