= Mad honey =

Psychoactive type of honey containing grayanotoxins

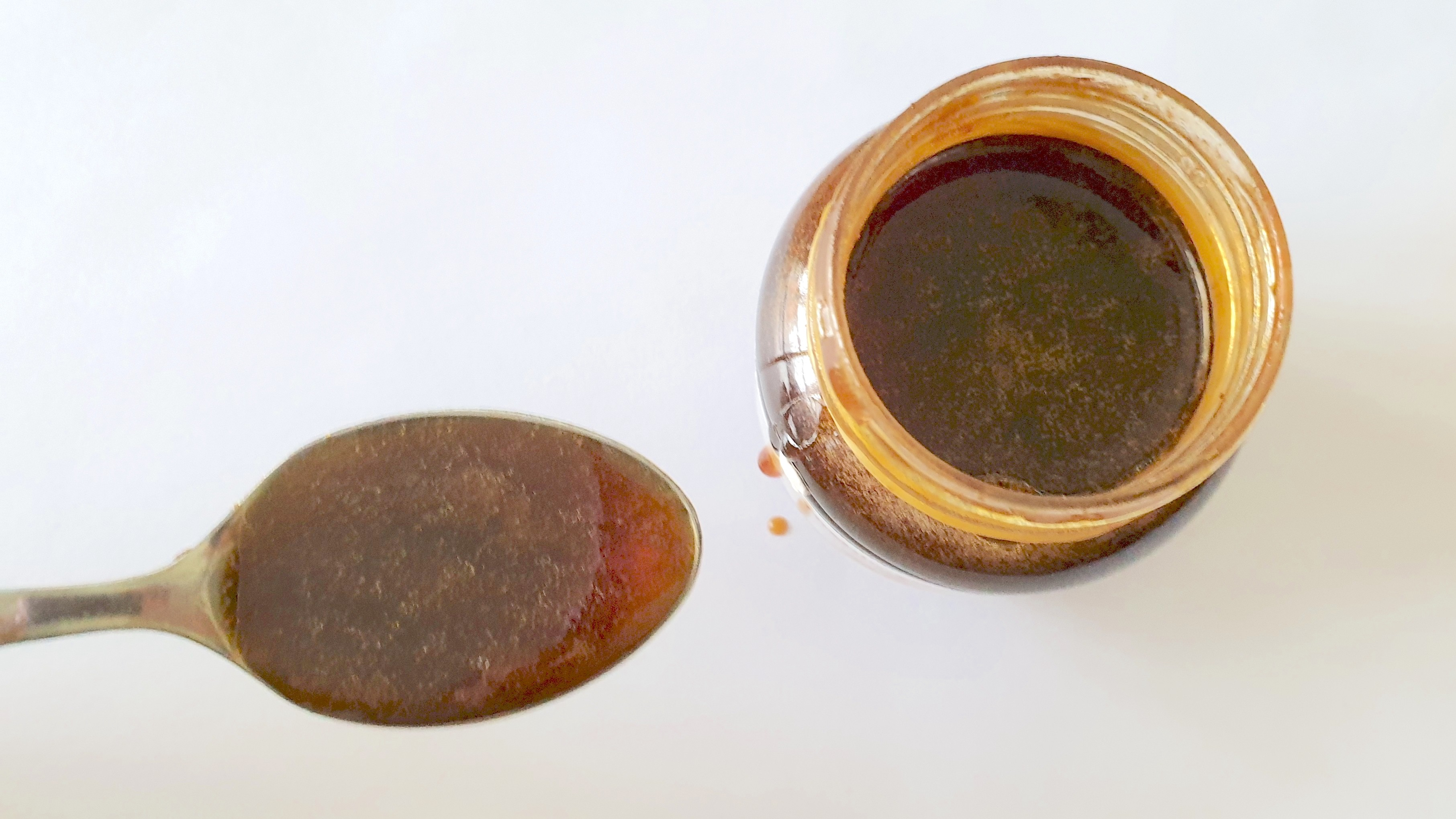
A sample of mad honey on a spoon

Mad honey is honey that contains grayanotoxins. The dark, reddish honey is produced from the nectar and pollen of genus Rhododendron and has both toxic and narcotic effects.

Mad honey is produced principally in Nepal and Turkey, where it is used both as a traditional medicine and a recreational drug. In the Himalayan range, it is produced by Himalayan giant honey bees (Apis laboriosa). The Gurung people of Nepal have practiced wild honey hunting as a sacred ancient tradition for generations. The honey can also be found rarely in the eastern United States.

Historical accounts of mad honey are found in Ancient Greek texts. The Greek military leader Xenophon wrote in his Anabasis about the effects of mad honey on soldiers in 401 BCE. In 65 BCE, during the Third Mithridatic War, King Mithridates used mad honey in a mass poisoning campaign against Pompey's soldiers. During the 18th century, mad honey was imported to Europe where it was added to alcoholic beverages.

== Historical accounts ==
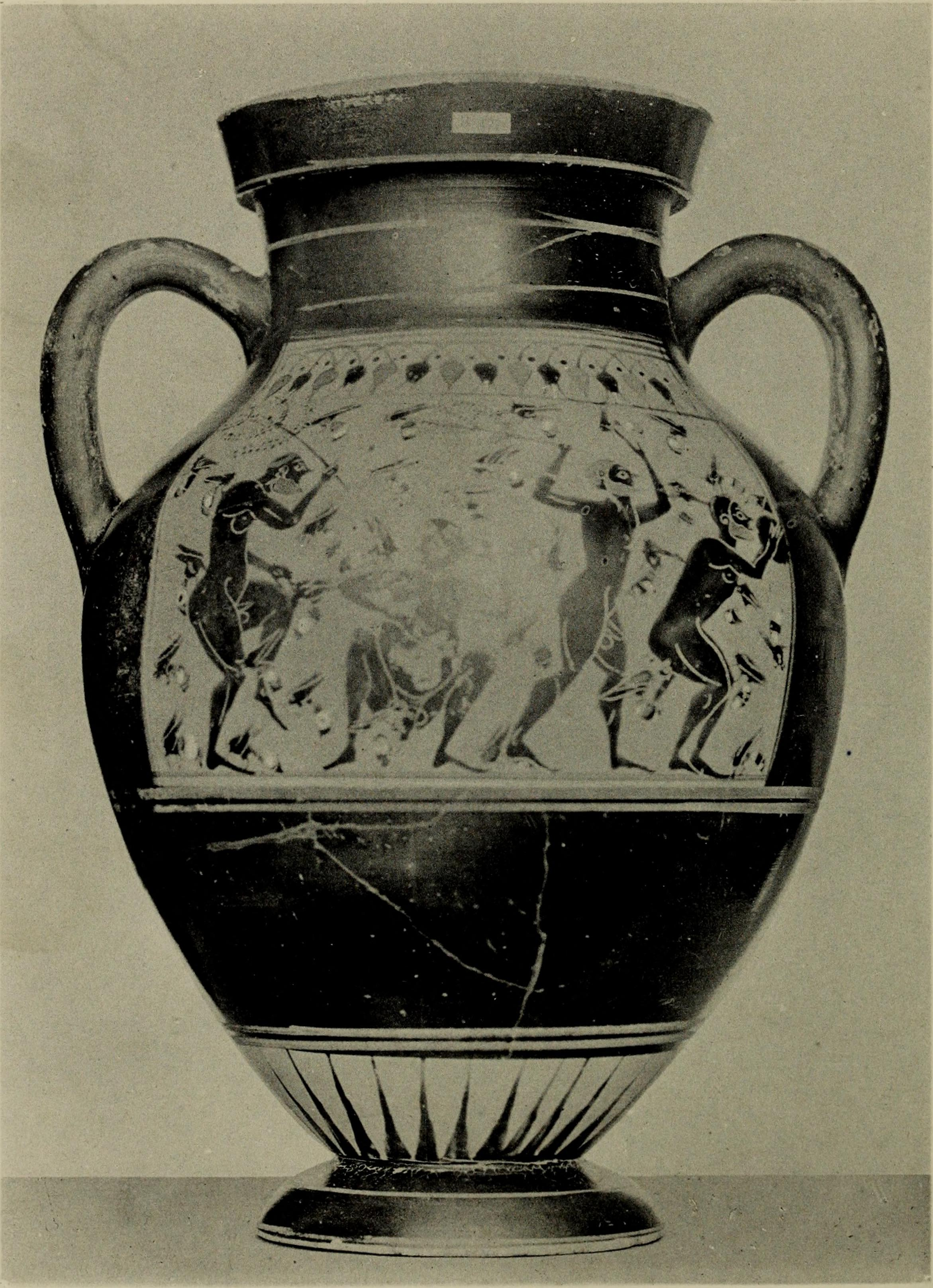
An amphora from Vulci depicting Laius, Celeus, Cerberus, and Aegolius being stung by bees in the Dictaean Cave.

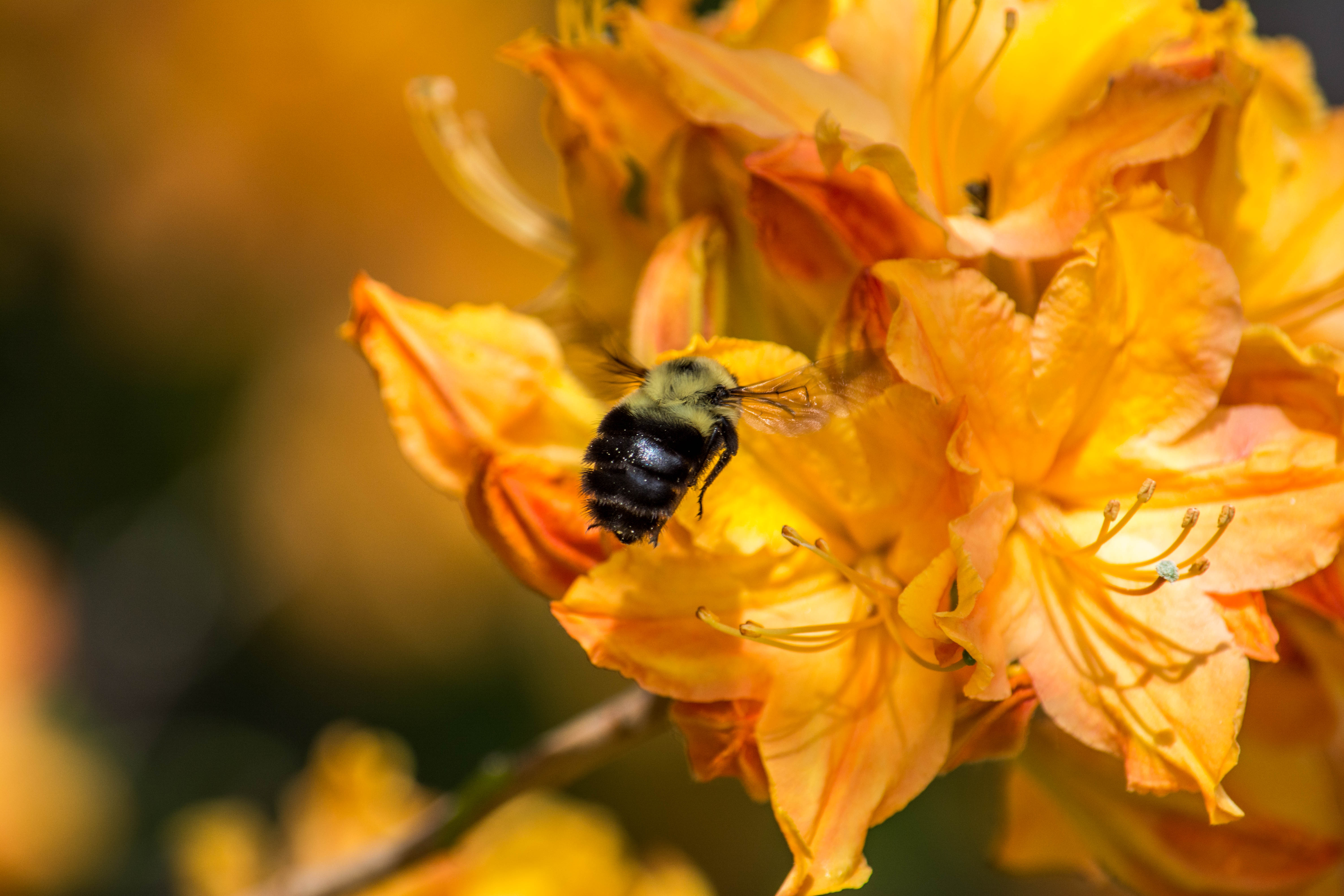
Rhododendron species are a source of the grayanotoxins that give mad honey its properties.

Historical accounts of mad honey stretch back over two millennia. Early accounts by Ancient Greek historians noted the properties of the honey and its floral origins. There are a few accounts of its use as a biological weapon, usually as experienced by foraging soldiers.

The 6th-century BCE Homeric Hymn to Hermes, part of the Homeric Hymns, may indirectly allude to the use of mad honey. The text refers to the melissai (bee-oracles) of Delphi's Mount Parnassus who could prophesy only after ingesting meli chloron (green honey), and may have been referring to Pythia, the Oracle of Delphi.

The Greek military leader and historian Xenophon wrote an account of a 401 BCE incident involving mad honey in his work Anabasis about the expedition of the Ten Thousand. In his account, he describes how Greek soldiers traveling near Trabzon (now part of Turkey) near the Black Sea, ate mad honey and then became disoriented, suffering vomiting and diarrhea, and no longer able to stand. The soldiers recovered the following day.

The number of bee-hives was extraordinary, and all the soldiers that ate of the combs, lost their senses, vomited, and were affected with purging, and none of them were able to stand upright; such as had eaten only a little were like men greatly intoxicated, and such as had eaten much were like mad-men, and some like persons at the point of death.

They lay upon the ground, in consequence, in great numbers, as if there had been a defeat; and there was general dejection. The next day no one of them was found dead; and they recovered their senses about the same hour that they had lost them on the preceding day; and on the third and fourth days they got up as if after having taken physic.

Roman and Greek authorities believed mad honey could cure insanity. Aristotle noted that "at Trapezus honey from boxwood has a heavy scent, and they say that healthy men go mad, but that epileptics are cured by it immediately". Roman naturalist Pliny the Elder referred to mad honey as meli mænomenon and was among the first to recognize that the toxicity was linked to oleander, azalea, and Rhododendron species.

Historians also noted that mad honey's potency or intoxicating effects varied seasonally or cyclically. Pliny noted that the honey was most hazardous after wet springs, while Greek physician Pedanius Dioscorides noted that the honey was only dangerous in certain seasons.

Mad honey was used as an early biological weapon in the Black Sea region. In 65 BCE, during the Third Mithridatic War, King Mithridates staged a strategic withdrawal from Roman soldiers under General Pompey. Possibly under the counsel of Greek botanist Kateuas, Mithridates had the withdrawing soldiers place combs of mad honey on their path. The Roman soldiers who ate the honey succumbed to mad honey intoxication and were slain. The Greek geographer Strabo described the incident as having wiped out three maniples of Romans, which could mean anywhere from 480 to 1,800 soldiers.

Other incidents of honey poisonings may have been caused by mad honey. In 946, allies of Queen Olga of Kiev sent several tons of fermented honey to her Russian foes. Five thousand Russians were massacred as they lay in a stupor. Later in 1489, in the same region, Tatars consumed casks of mead made using mad honey that had been left in an abandoned camp. Ten thousand of the Tatars were slaughtered by Russians.

During the 18th century, around 25 tons of mad honey were exported from the Black Sea Region to Europe every year. It was known then in France as miel fou (crazy honey) and was added to beer and other alcoholic drinks to give them extra potency. American botanist Benjamin Smith Barton observed that beekeepers in Pennsylvania became intoxicated by mad honey. They added the honey to liquor and sold the concoction in New Jersey as an elixir they named 'metheglin' (mead). Barton noted that the inebriation began pleasantly, but could suddenly turn "ferocious". Former Confederate surgeon J. Grammer described in 1875 in Gleanings in Bee Culture that there were several incidents with soldiers from the South involving mad honey intoxication.

The chemical compound andromedotoxin (grayanotoxin I) was isolated from Trabzon honey by German scientist P. C. Plugge in 1891. The 1929 edition of the Encyclopædia Britannica dismissed the notion of poison honey as described in Greek and Roman texts, concluding that "in all likelihood the symptoms described by these old writers were due to overeating" or that the honey had been eaten on empty stomachs.

== Prevalence and harvesting ==
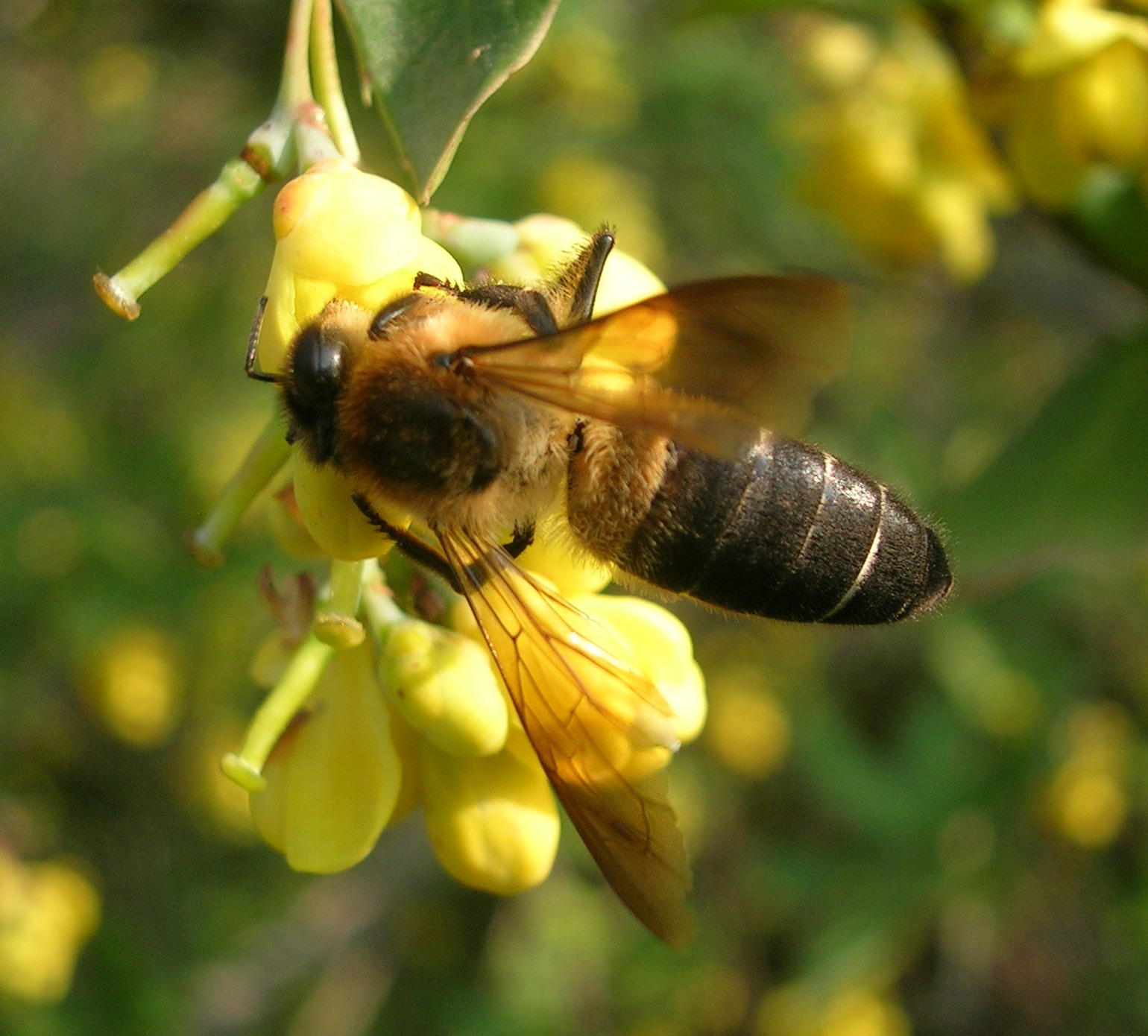
Mad honey in Nepal is typically produced by Apis laboriosa bees

Rhododendron species and other plants in the family Ericaceae produce grayanotoxins. Honey made from the nectar contains pollen from these plants as well as the grayanotoxins. Mad honey is darker and redder than other honeys, and has a slightly bitter taste. Due to its reddish color, it is sometimes called rose of the forest honey. Mad honey is produced in specific world regions, notably the Black Sea Region of Turkey and Nepal.

Small-scale producers of mad honey typically harvest honey from a small area or single hive, producing a honey containing a significant concentration of grayanotoxins. In contrast, large-scale honey production often mixes honey gathered from different locations, diluting the concentration of any contaminated honey. A Caucasus beekeeper noted in a 1929 article in Bee World that the potency of the honey could vary across a single honeycomb and that the most dangerous mad honey was produced at high elevations during dry spells.

=== In Turkey ===
In Turkey, mad honey is known as deli bal and is used as a recreational drug and traditional medicine. It is most commonly made from the nectar of Rhododendron luteum and Rhododendron ponticum in the Caucasus region. Beekeepers in the Kaçkar Mountains have produced mad honey for centuries.

=== In the Hindu Kush Himalayan region ===
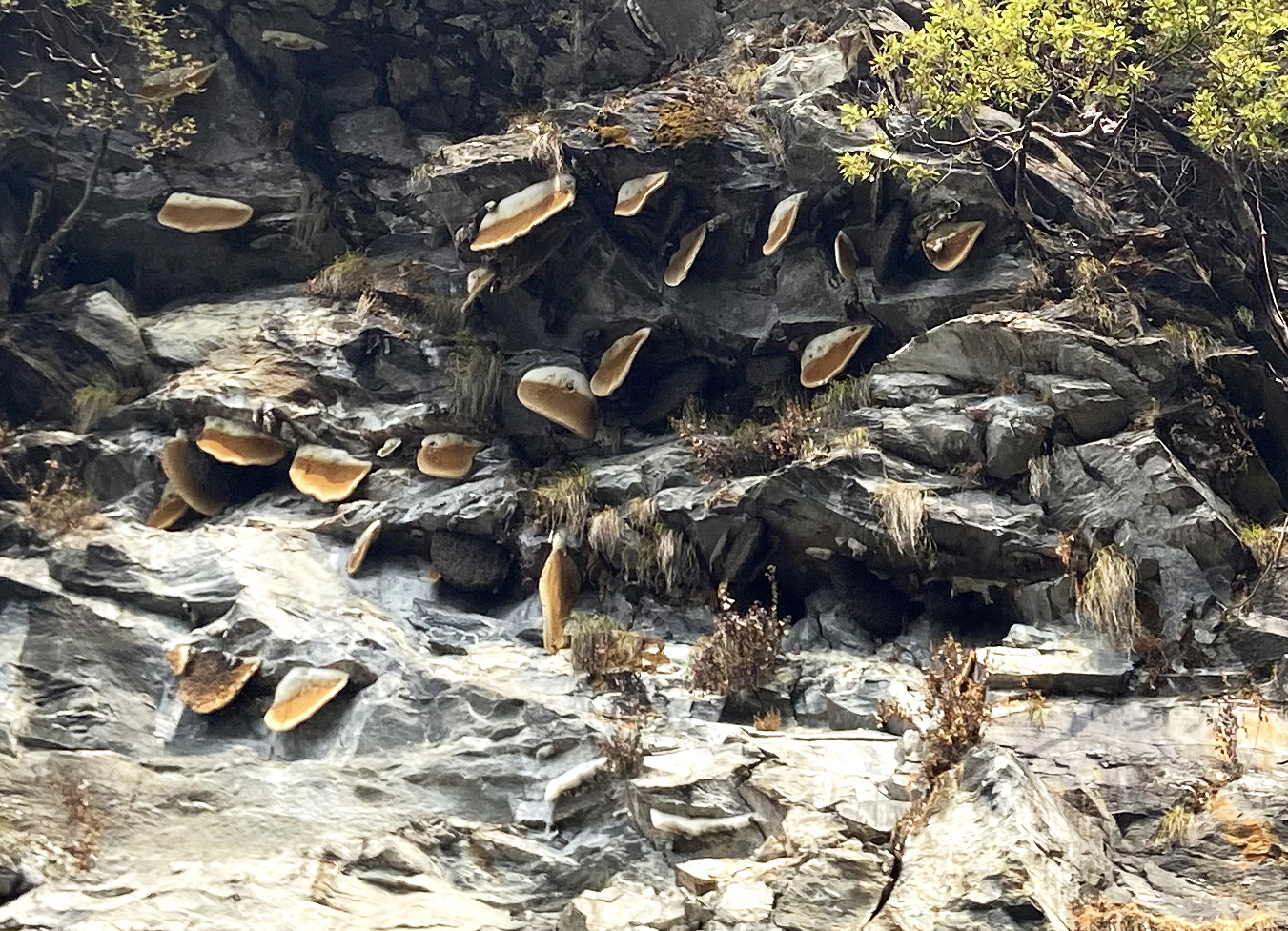
A honeycomb colony of Apis laboriosa on a vertical rockface in the Himalayas

Mad honey, known as bhir mauri ko maha in Nepal, is produced in the foothills of the Himalayas by Himalayan giant honey bees (Apis laboriosa). In southern Asia, Apis laboriosa nests are found mostly in the Hindu Kush Himalayan region. The bees produce mad honey in the spring when plants from the family Ericaceae, such as rhododendrons, are in bloom.

Apis laboriosa nests consist of single, open combs with large bases reaching 1.5 m (4 ft 11 in). The hives are built on tree limbs or steep, southeast or southwest-facing rocky cliffsides, at elevations of 1,200–4,000 m (3,900–13,100 ft), often situated underneath overhanging ledges where they are protected from the elements.

==== Honey gathering ====
In central Nepal and northern India, the Gurung people have traditionally gathered the honey for centuries, scaling cliffsides to reach the hives. Residents collect the honey twice a year, once in late spring and once in the late fall. The honey hunters use rope ladders with wooden rungs to access the nests and set fires underneath to smoke out the bees.

Apis laboriosa populations in Nepal have experienced dramatic declines due to overharvesting, hydroelectric dam and road construction, and the loss of water sources. Population decline is also attributed to deforestation and landslides. In Nepal, there has been an annual 70% decline in honeybee populations in Himalayan cliffs. A specialist with the International Centre for Integrated Mountain Development reported in 2022 that there had been a decrease both in the number of cliffs that host bees and in the number of colonies each cliff supports. Recommendations for sustainable honey harvesting include leaving half of the newly formed combs undisturbed and only harvesting portions of the combs.

=== In other regions ===
==== United States ====
Mad honey is rarely produced in the United States. According to Texas A&M professor Vaughn Bryant, an expert on honey, mad honey is produced in the Appalachian Mountains in the Eastern U.S. when a late cold snap kills most flowers but not rhododendrons. Honeys produced from mountain laurel (Kalmia latifolia) and sheep laurel (Kalmia angustifolia) also contain grayanotoxins and are potentially deadly if large quantities are eaten.

==== Europe ====
In Europe, honey containing grayanotoxins is produced from Rhododendron ferrugineum, which occurs in the Alps and Pyrenees. However, no grayanane intoxication cases have been reported for honeys from the European Union.

== Potential toxicity ==
The chemical structure of grayanotoxin I - the suspected active component of mad honey

Consumption of mad honey can cause a poisonous reaction called grayanotoxin poisoning, mad honey disease, honey intoxication, or rhododendron poisoning. The honey is the most common cause of grayanotoxin poisoning. Bees are not affected by grayanotoxins.

In humans and some other animals, grayanotoxins act on the central nervous system, binding to sodium ion channels and preventing them from closing. This results in low blood pressure (hypotension) and reduced heart rates (bradycardia). Corresponding effects include lightheadedness, blurred vision, dizziness, and respiratory difficulty. In some cases, blood pressure may be reduced to potentially dangerous levels, causing nausea, fainting, seizures, arrhythmia, atrioventricular blocks, muscle paralysis, and loss of consciousness.

The degree of mad honey intoxication depends on the quantity consumed, and on the concentration of grayanotoxins. The effects may include delirium, vertigo, nausea, psychedelic optical effects, such as tunnel vision, and whirling lights, hallucinations, and impaired speech where syllables and words are spoken out of sequence, typically occurring within minutes to a few hours after ingestion. The recovery time ranges from hours to about two days, although most symptoms typically subside after 12 hours.

A 2023 assessment by the European Food Safety Authority (EFSA) concluded that grayanotoxins should be considered genotoxic in vivo, and that honey containing grayanotoxins I and III at a combined concentration of 0.05 mg/kg would not be expected to cause acute effects in any age group. EFSA was unable to assess the risks of chronic or repeated exposure, citing a lack of data on chronic toxicity and carcinogenicity.

A 2015 systematic review of 1199 cases of mad honey intoxication found no reported deaths. Treatments for mad honey poisoning include atropine, adrenaline, and saline infusions.

== Usage ==
Mad honey is most frequently produced and consumed in regions of Turkey and Nepal as a traditional medicine or recreational drug. It is used as a traditional medicine to treat sore throat, arthritis, diabetes, and hypertension. In the Turkish Black Sea Region it is used to treat indigestion, abdominal pain, gastritis, peptic ulcers, and the flu.

For centuries, in the Caucasus, small amounts of Pontic azalea honey have been added to alcoholic drinks to amplify the intoxicating effect. In Turkey, a spoonful of mad honey is traditionally added to milk as a tonic. Mad honey was banned in South Korea in 2005.

Mad honey is also thought to help with erectile dysfunction and increase sexual performance. Most cases of mad honey poisoning are experienced by middle-aged men.

== See also ==
- Bees and toxic chemicals
- A Haunting in Venice
