= Antoninus Liberalis =

Greek grammarian who lived between the 1st and 3rd centuries

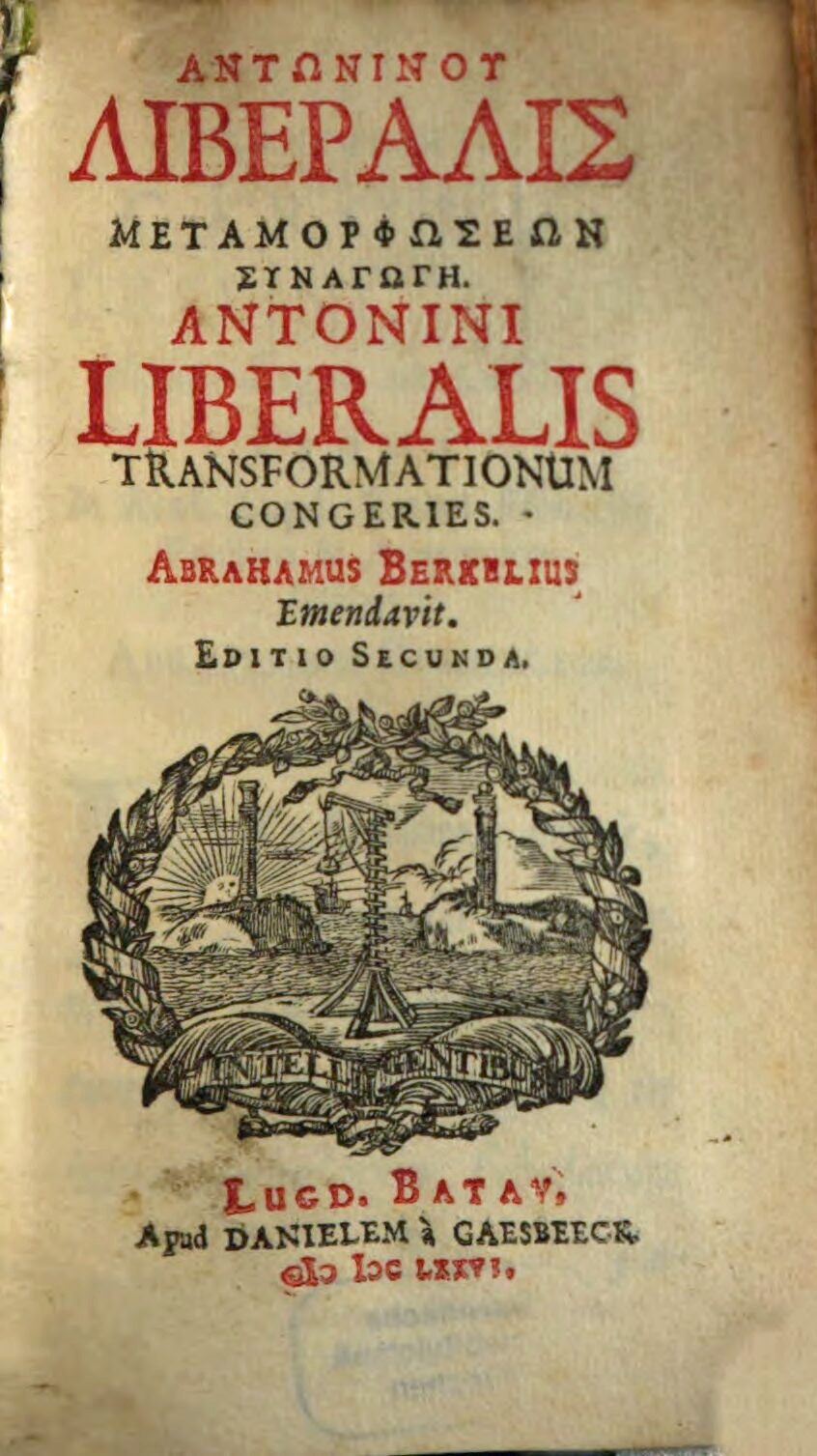
Title page of an edition of Antoninus Liberalis printed in 1676 by Daniel van Gaesbeeck

Antoninus Liberalis (Greek: Ἀντωνῖνος Λιβεράλις) was an Ancient Greek mythographer who probably flourished in the late 2nd or early 3rd century CE. He is known as the author of The Metamorphoses, a collection of tales that offers new variants of already familiar myths as well as stories that are not attested in other ancient sources.

== Work ==
Antoninus' only surviving work is the Metamorphoses (Greek: Μεταμορφώσεων Συναγωγή, Metamorphṓseōn Synagogḗ, lit. 'collection of transformations'), a collection of forty-one very briefly summarised tales about mythical metamorphoses, written in prose, not verse. The literary genre of myths of transformations of men, women, heroes, and nymphs into plants and animals, springs, rocks and mountains, and stars were widespread and popular in the classical world. This work has more polished parallels in the better-known Metamorphoses of Ovid and in the Metamorphoses of Lucius Apuleius. Like them, its sources, where they can be traced, are Hellenistic works, such as Nicander's Heteroeumena and the Ornithogonia ascribed to Boios.

The work survives in a single manuscript of the late 9th century, now in the Palatine Library in Heidelberg. The manuscript, a collection of several works on geography, mythography, and other topics, was brought from Constantinople to Basel by John of Ragusa about 1437; it was bequeathed to the Dominican monastery at Basel after John's death in 1443, and to the University of Basel after the dissolution of the monastery in 1529. In 1553 the printer Hieronymus Froeben sold it to Otto Henry, Elector Palatine. In 1623, with the rest of the Palatine Library, it was sent to Rome as a gift to Pope Gregory IX, and in 1797, along with 500 other Vatican manuscripts, it was taken to Paris under the terms of the Treaty of Tolentino. In 1816, it was restored to Heidelberg under the terms of the Congress of Vienna.

The text of the Metamorphoses was first printed in Basel in 1568 by Guilielmus Xylander. Because three leaves have since disappeared from the manuscript, Xylander's edition is the only authority for the text of these passages.

Many of the transformations in this compilation are found nowhere else, and some may simply be inventions of Antoninus. The manner of the narrative is a laconic and conversational prose: "this completely inartistic text," as Sarah Myers called it, offers the briefest summaries of lost metamorphoses by more ambitious writers, such as Nicander and Boios. Francis Celoria, who translated the work into English, regards the text as perfectly acceptable koine Greek, though with numerous hapax legomena; it is "grimly simple" and mostly devoid of grammatical particles which would convey humor or a narratorial persona.

=== Tales ===
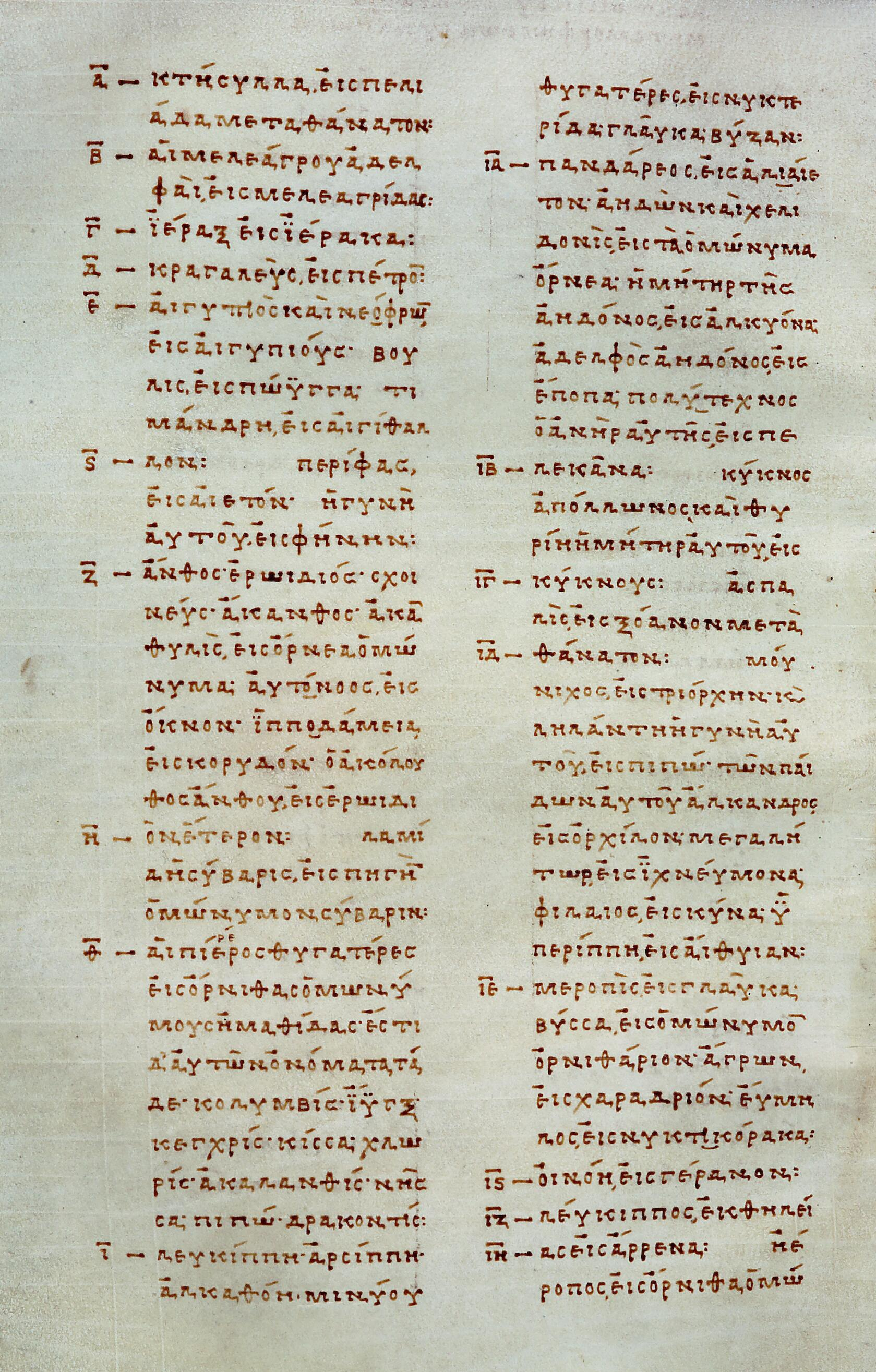
The table of contents of the Metamorphoses in the Palatine manuscript (Pal. graec. 398, fol. 189v), late 9th century

1. Ctesylla (turns into a dove)
2. The Meleagrids (turned into guineafowls)
3. Hierax (turns into a hawk)
4. Cragaleus (turned into stone)
5. Aegypius (turned into a vulture)
6. Periphas (turned into an eagle)
7. Anthus (turned into a bird)
8. Lamia or Sybaris
9. Emathides (turned into birds)
10. Minyades
11. Aëdon or Nightingale
12. Cycnus or Swan
13. Aspalis
14. Munichus
15. Meropis
16. Oenoe (changed into a crane)
17. Leucippus
18. Eeropus or Bee-eater
19. The Thieves (Note: Aegolius, Celeus, Cerberus and Laius in Idaean cave.)
20. Clinis
21. Polyphonte
22. Cerambus
23. Battus
24. Ascalabus
25. Metioche and Menippe
26. Hylas
27. Iphigeneia
28. Typhon
29. Galinthias (turned into weasel or cat)
30. Byblis (turns into a nymph)
31. The Messapians
32. Dryope
33. Alcmene
34. Smyrna
35. The Herdsmen
36. Pandareus
37. The Dorians (Note: The companions of Diomedes.)
38. Wolf (turned into stone by Psamathe)
39. Arceophon (his lover turns into stone)
40. Britomartis
41. The Teumessian fox (fox turns into stone)
