= Cannabis in Korea =

Cannabis in Korea may refer to:

- Cannabis in North Korea
- Cannabis in South Korea
