= Cannabis in South Korea =

- Location of South Korea (dark green)
- Medicinal: Legal
- Recreational: Illegal

Cannabis in South Korea is illegal for recreational use. In November 2018, the country's Narcotics Control Act was amended and use of medical cannabis became legal, making South Korea the first country in East Asia to legalize medical cannabis.

While cannabis use has risen in South Korea since the 1970s, it remains far less popular than synthetic drugs such as methamphetamine; of 11,916 people arrested for drug crimes in 2015, only 1% were for cannabis-based drugs.

== History ==
=== Early history ===
Cannabis was an important crop in ancient Korea, believed to be introduced to the region via the Silk Road from South Asia, with samples of hempen fabric discovered dating back as early as 3000 BCE. The traditional sambe cloth, an ivory colored fabric, is made from hemp. In addition to its use as fabric, the hemp seed was thought to have medicinal qualities such as a laxative.

=== Modern history ===
Following the Rhee Syngman administration's 1957 Narcotics Act(마약법), "Indian Marijuana", along with poppies, opium, and cocaine, was labelled a forbidden narcotic. There is speculation that this act was heavily encouraged by the U.S. Treasury Department's Federal Bureau of Narcotics commissioner Harry J. Anslinger, who had long been advocating for its prohibition. Importantly, the 1957 act only outlawed Indian-grown marijuana, allowing the Korean market of cannabis growth to flourish.

In the 1960s Korean cannabis usage rose dramatically with the influence of hippie culture diffusing outwards from U.S. Army bases in Korea. Using the "happy smoke" started to symbolize rebelliousness, and many popular singers of the time began smoking the herb.

In the 1970s, amid its associations with insurgent youth culture abroad, cannabis was banned in all forms under the Cannabis Control Act of 1976(대마관리법), which later merged with the Narcotics Control Act(향정신성의약품 관리법) in 2000. The across-the-board ban on cannabis remained unchanged.

In January 2018, Rep. Shin Chang-Hyun, a member of the National Assembly of South Korea, proposed a bill that would revise the Narcotics Control Act and allow individuals with specific medical conditions to use cannabis with the approval from the Ministry of Food and Drug Safety.

The proposed revision overcame a major obstacle later in July when it won the support of the ministry, which said at the time it would permit Epidiolex, Marinol and Sativex for conditions including epilepsy, symptoms of HIV/AIDS and cancer-related treatments.

On November 23, 2018, the National Assembly approved the amendments to the Narcotics Control Acts and medical cannabis was partially legalized.

== Legal status ==
=== Medical use ===
Use of medical cannabis is legal with the approval from the Ministry of Food and Drug Safety. Currently, the ministry only allows Epidiolex, Marinol and Sativex. The plant itself alongside its natural derivatives and extract, despite legal under the law, has yet to be approved.

Prior to obtaining the drug, patients are required to apply to the Korea Orphan Drug Center, a government body facilitating patient access to rare medicines, after receiving a doctor's prescription. Approval will be granted on a case-by-case basis.

The import of the drug began in early 2019, according to the ministry.

=== Recreational use ===
Despite the reform, recreational cannabis remains strictly forbidden by the law. A violation is punishable by up to five years in prison or a fine of up to 50 million won, about US$42,556 (as of November, 2021).

South Korean authorities have repeatedly warned their citizens that they are subject to their country's criminal code no matter where they are in the world and advised them to refrain from using cannabis abroad.

== Industrial hemp ==
Cannabis has been a source of fabric for Korea since ancient times, and as recently as the 1930s hemp was grown in every province of Korea, particularly in the south where it grew best. In the late 1950s, 9,000 hectares of hemp were cultivated in South Korea. Industrial hemp for fabric, one of the major representative crops in the Gyeongbuk (Andong) region, was designated as a free special industrial hemp regulation zone in 2020. In this region, hemp plant can be cultivated if you get a license.

== Economy ==
A Korea Times article of 2014 noted that despite risks of a prison sentence of up to five years or a fine of up to 50 million won (approximately $42,500 USD as of November 2021), cannabis could be easily bought in South Korea by contacting dealers on the Internet. Its journalist noted that according to dealers cannabis sold for US$30–50 per gram.

== In popular culture ==
=== 20th century ===
In the pursuit of scapegoats to increase the popularity of his 1976 Cannabis Control Act, South Korean President Park Chung-hee turned his gaze inwards, towards pop entertainers performing at U.S. Army bases, a hotbed of marijuana usage. In the winter of 1975, Park Chung-hee led a government crackdown on marijuana usage, resulting in the arrest of over 50 well known South Korean entertainers. Among them was the rock singer Shin Jung-hyeon, defamed in the media following his arrest as the "daemacho ringleader." He was imprisoned for four months following his arrest.

=== Modern-day ===
A number of high-profile K-pop artists have been prosecuted for the recreational use of marijuana. Notable entertainers arrested for cannabis usage include Kim Kye-hoon, better known by his rap name, Crown J, singer-songwriter Psy, and Big Bang's T.O.P. The celebrities received a variety of sentences, with prison time ranging from 25 days to 10 months.

Along with legal action, societal backlash against the disgraced stars is often swift and serious. After T.O.P. was charged for possession and usage of marijuana, his record label YG Entertainment became widely referred to as Yak Guk (약국) Entertainment, which translates to "the drugstore." With an average of 40 months following a drug related scandal for a Korean entertainer to return to the stage, K-pop artists apprehended for using cannabis often have a difficult time regaining their lost stardom.

== See also ==
- Drug policy of South Korea
