= Aegolius (mythology) =

Mythological Cretan

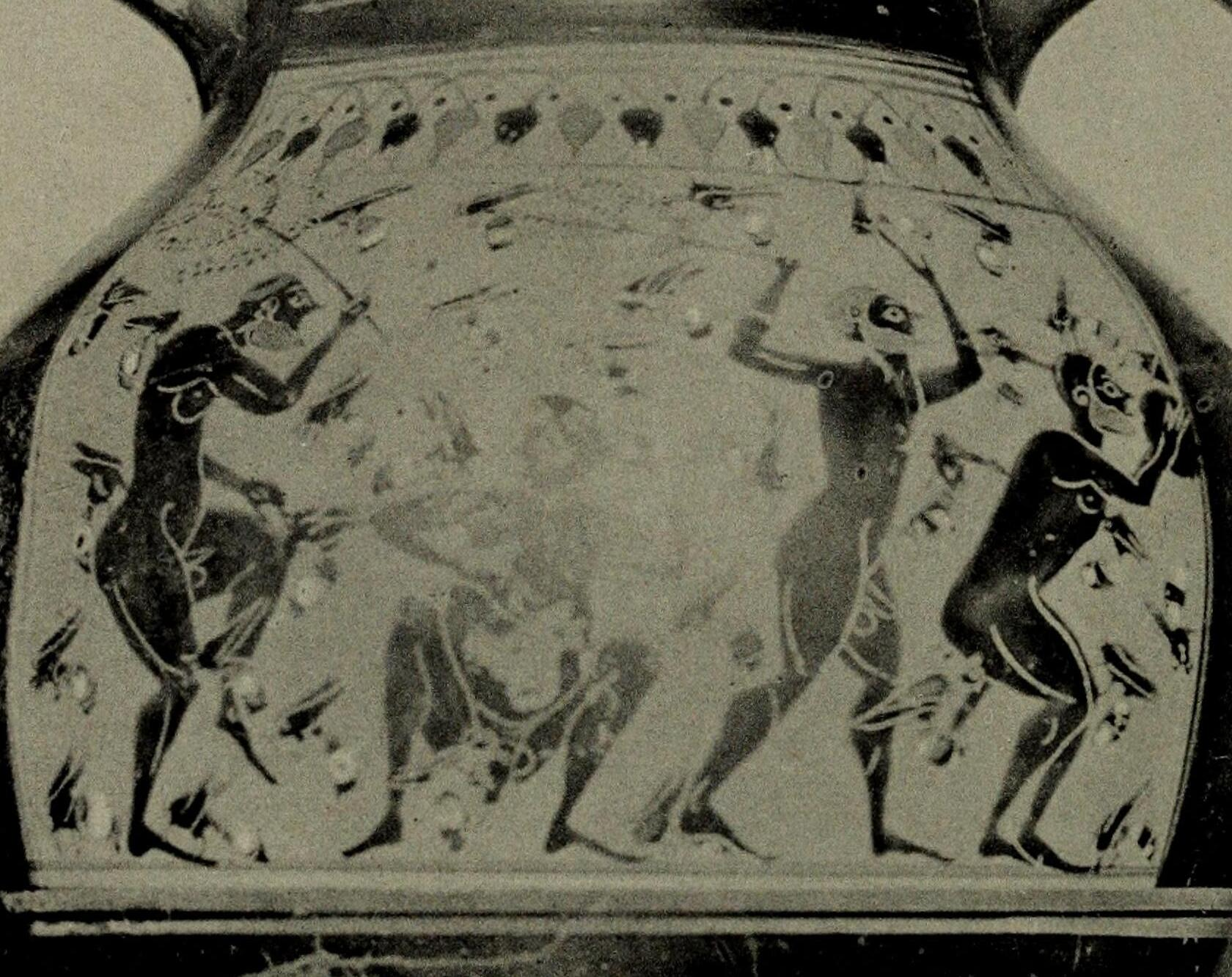
Aegolius and his 3 companions in the Dictaean Cave, black-figure Attic amphora circa 540 BC, British Museum

In Greek mythology, Aegolius (Ancient Greek: Αἰγωλιός, romanized: Aigōliós, lit. 'a bird of ill omen') is a Cretan man who attempted to steal from Zeus, the king of gods, and was punished for it. He was transformed into an owl.

== Mythology ==
The Cretan Aegolius and three other men, Cerberus, Celeus and Laius entered the sacred but forbidden cave of Zeus in Crete where the young god had been born and brought up with the aim to steal some of the sacred honey produced by Zeus's bee nurses. Zeus thundered and stripped them of their brazen armors. He meant to kill them all, but Themis and the Moirai advised him against that, as the cave was a holy place and no one should be killed in it. So Zeus turned them all into birds instead; Aegolius became an aegolius owl.

== See also ==
- Pandareus
- Tantalus
- Pyrrhus

== Bibliography ==
- Antoninus Liberalis, The Metamorphoses of Antoninus Liberalis translated by Francis Celoria (Routledge 1992). Online version at the Topos Text Project.
- Celoria, Francis (October 24, 1992). The Metamorphoses of Antoninus Liberalis: A Translation with a Commentary'. USA, Canada: Routledge. ISBN 0-415-06896-7.
- Jacobs, Joseph; Trübner Nutt, Alfred; Robinson Wright, Arthur; Crooke, William (1904). Folklore. Vol. 15. London, UK: Folklore Society.
- William Smith, A Dictionary of Greek and Roman Biography and Mythology, London. John Murray: printed by Spottiswoode and Co., New-Street Square and Parliament Street, 1873.
