= Etymology of the Korean currencies =

The won is the currency of both North and South Korea. "Won" is a cognate of the Chinese currency unit, the yuan (圓/圆/元), meaning "round object". The won is subdivided into 100 jeon (Korean: 전; Hanja: 錢; RR: jeon; MR: chŏn).

Yang is a former Korean currency. It is a cognate of the Chinese tael (兩; 两 pronounced "liǎng" in Mandarin). The yang was subdivided into 100 fun (푼) (pronounced "pun" but spelt with an "f" on the coins). Fun is a cognate of the Chinese word fen (分; fēn), referring to 1/100 of a Chinese yuan in modern context.

== History ==
Due to interchanging Chinese and Japanese influences, changing Romanization methods, and the use of both hanja (Sino-Korean characters) and hangul scripts, the etymology can be hard to understand.

From 1892 to 1902, when the yang was used, 1 hwan/won (圜 = 圓 in Chinese) = 5 yang (兩), while in the Chinese monetary system of that time, 1 yuan (圓) = 0.72 tael (兩).

In 1902, the Dai-Ichi Bank (The First National Bank of Japan), which handled the Korean government's custom duties, obtained permission from the imperial Korean government to issue banknotes in yen replacing yang.

The table below summarizes the language used on the modern circulating and historical Korean currencies.

Period	Subunit				Main unit			Super unit				Note
Period	English	Hanja	Hangul	Ratio	English	Hanja	Hangul	English	Hanja	Hangul	Ratio	Note
1892-1902	**fun**	**分**	**푼**	1/100	**yang**	**兩**	냥	**hwan**	**圜**	환	5	
1902-1910	**chon**	**錢**	**전**	1/100	**won**	**圓**	**원**	None				1 won = 10 yang of the previous period
1902-1945	**sen**	**錢**	N/A	1/100	**yen**	**圓**	N/A	None				1 yen = 1 won = 10 yang
1902-1945	Due to the Japanese rule, the English transliterations were based on Japanese pronunciation of the Chinese characters.											
North Korea; 1945–present	chon	**錢**	**전**	1/100	won	**圓**	**원**	None				1 won = 1 yen in 1945; 1 new won = 1 old won in 1959. Use of Hanja disappeared after 1959
South Korea; 1945-1953	chon	錢	전	1/100	**won**	**圓**	**원**	None				1 won = 1 yen
South Korea; 1953-1962	chon	錢	전	1/100	**hwan**	**圜**	**환**	None				1 hwan = 100 won of the previous period
South Korea; 1962–present	**jeon**	錢	**전**	1/100	**won**	N/A	**원**	None				1 won = 10 hwan of the previous period
**Bold** = what was actually printed on the notes or engraved on the coins

== Use in the Western World ==
The word jeon is also used in Korean to translate the word "cent," and in this context is associated with bul (불, 弗), meaning "dollar." (The hanja character resembles the symbol "$".) These two words are used by Koreans living in the Western hemisphere when referring to dollar currencies.

== Sign and computing ==
The won sign ("₩", a capital W with a horizontal stroke) is represented in Unicode at the code point 20A9 (8361 in decimal).

== See also ==
- Hanja
- Hangul
- Revised Romanization of Korean
- McCune–Reischauer
