= Celeus (Crete) =

Greek mythological person

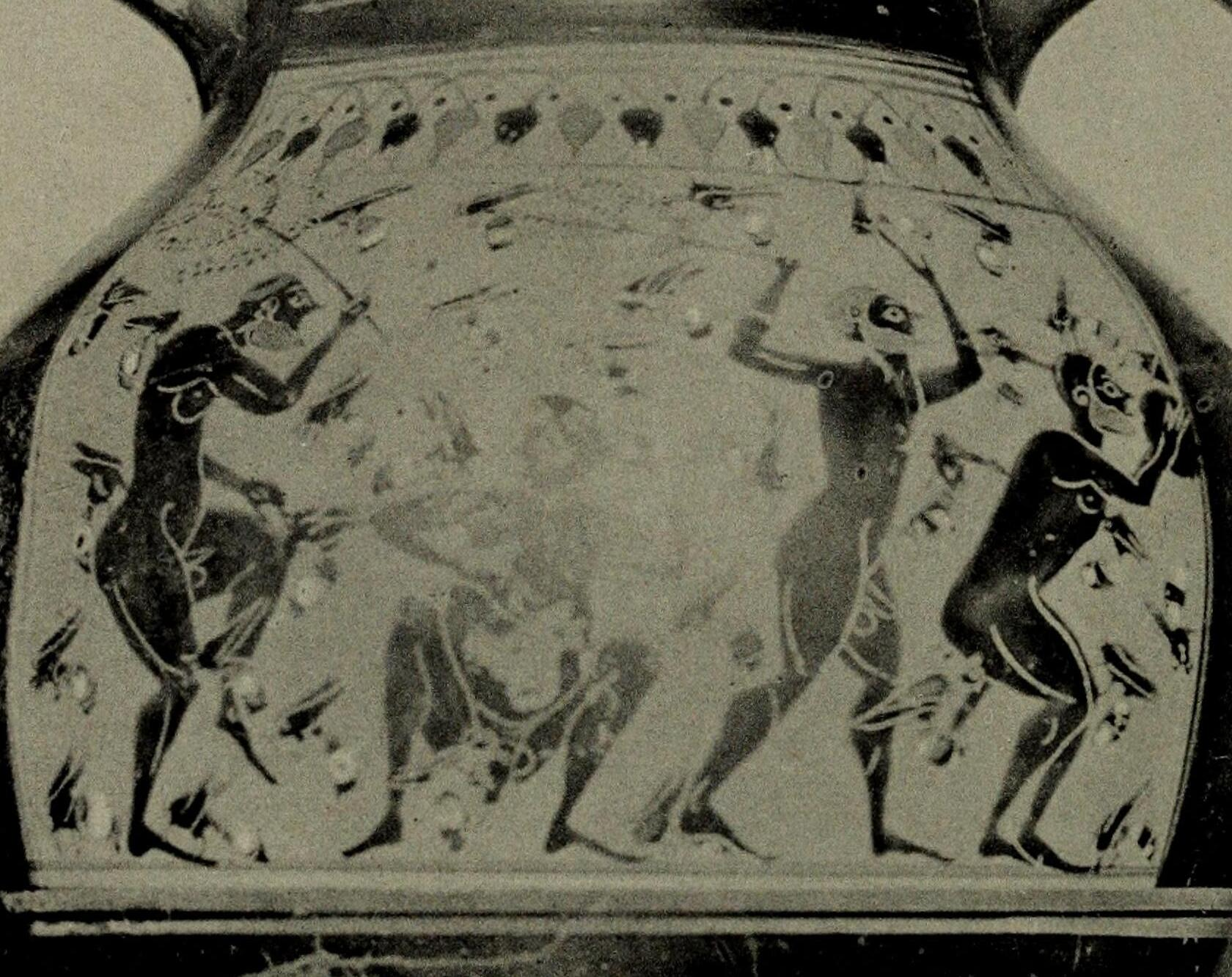
Celeus and his 3 companions in the Dictaean Cave, black-figure Attic amphora circa 540 BC, British Museum

In Greek mythology, Celeus (/ˈsiːliəs/ SEE-lee-əs; Ancient Greek: Κελεός, romanized: Keleós, lit. 'woodpecker') is a Cretan man who attempted to steal from Zeus, the king of gods, and was punished for it. He was transformed into a woodpecker for attempting to steal from him.

== Mythology ==
The Cretan Celeus and three other men, Cerberus, Aegolius and Laius entered the sacred cave of Zeus in Crete where the young god had been born and raised with the aim to steal some of the sacred honey produced by the bee caretakers of Zeus. Zeus thundered and stripped them of their brazen armors. He meant to kill them all, but Themis and the Fates advised Zeus against doing that, saying the cave as a holy place should not have anyone be killed inside it. So Zeus turned them all into birds instead; Celeus became a woodpecker. Celeus shares a name with the king of Eleusis.

== Origins ==
The myth of Celeus, Cerberus, Aegolius and Laius originates from the only surviving work of Antoninus Liberalis, the Metamorphoses. Though the Metamorphoses includes myths with earlier origins the myth of Celeus, Cerberus, Aegolius and Laius was first told in writing by Antoninus Liberalis.

== See also ==
- Pandareus
- Tantalus
- Pyrrhus

== Bibliography ==
- Antoninus Liberalis, The Metamorphoses of Antoninus Liberalis translated by Francis Celoria (Routledge 1992). Online version at the Topos Text Project.
- Celoria, Francis (October 24, 1992). The Metamorphoses of Antoninus Liberalis: A Translation with a Commentary'. USA, Canada: Routledge. ISBN 0-415-06896-7.
- Jacobs, Joseph; Trübner Nutt, Alfred; Robinson Wright, Arthur; Crooke, William (1904). Folklore. Vol. 15. London, UK: Folklore Society.
- Pollard, J. R. T. (1948). The Birds of Aristophanes - A Source Book for Old Beliefs. The American Journal of Philology, 69(4), 353–376. https://doi.org/10.2307/290909
- William Smith, A Dictionary of Greek and Roman Biography and Mythology, London. John Murray: printed by Spottiswoode and Co., New-Street Square and Parliament Street, 1873.
