= Laius (Crete) =

Greek mythological person

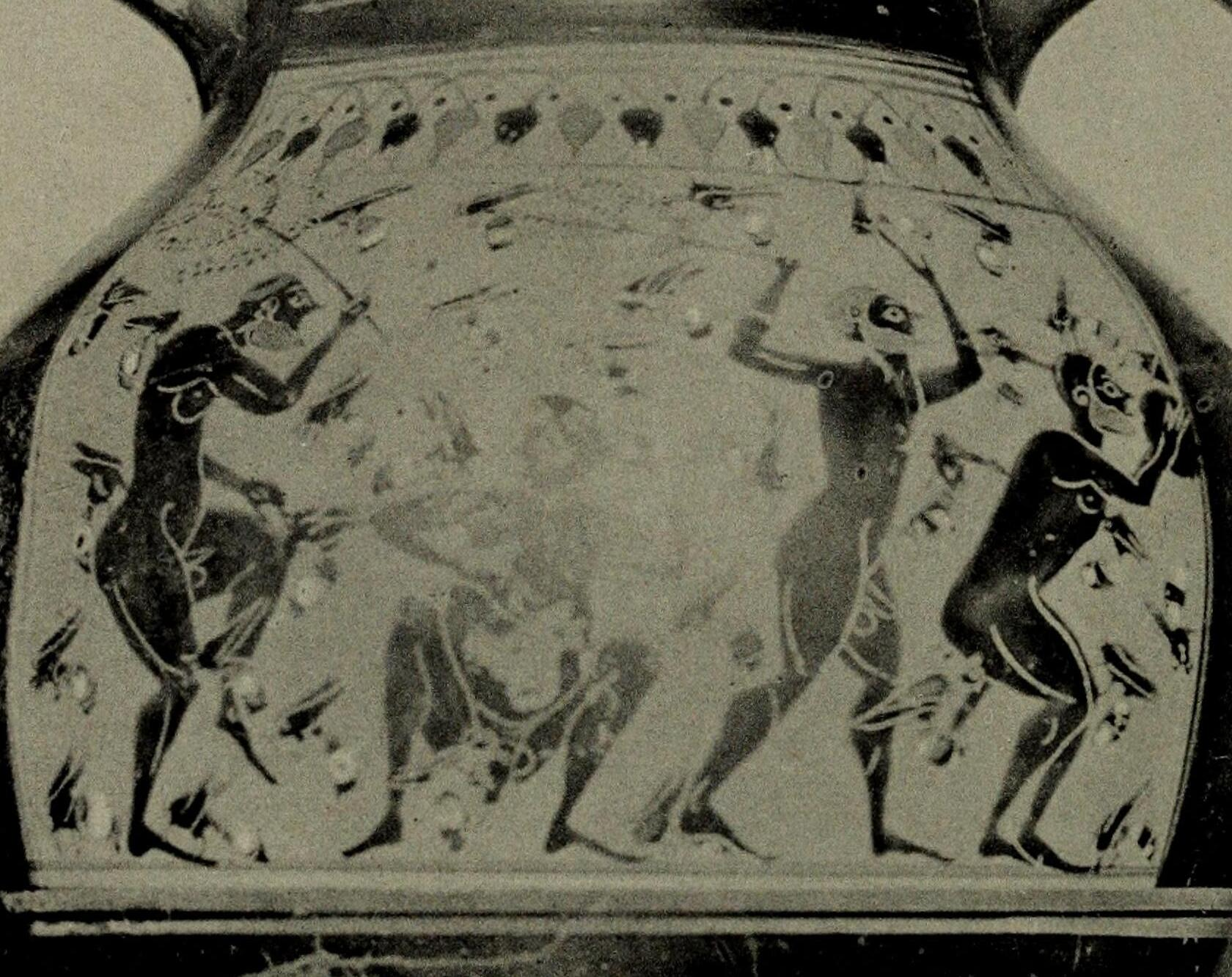
Laius and his 3 companions in the Dictaean Cave, black-figure Attic amphora circa 540 BC, British Museum.

In Greek mythology, Laius (/ˈleɪəs, ˈlaɪəs/ L(A)Y-əs; Ancient Greek: Λάιος, romanized: Láios) is a Cretan man who attempted to steal from Zeus, the king of gods, and was punished for it. He was transformed into a bird for attempting to steal from him.

== Mythology ==
The Cretan Laius and three other men, Cerberus, Aegolius and Celeus entered the sacred cave of Zeus in Crete where the young god had been born and brought up with the aim to steal some of the sacred honey produced there by Zeus's former bee nurses. Zeus thundered and stripped them of their brazen armors. He meant to kill them all, but the goddess of justice Themis and the Fates advised Zeus against doing that, saying the cave as a holy place should not have anyone be killed inside it. So Zeus turned them all into birds instead; Laius became a blue thrush (laios). Laius shares a name with a mythical king of Thebes, the father of Oedipus.

== See also ==
- Pandareus
- Tantalus
- Pyrrhus

== Bibliography ==
- Antoninus Liberalis, The Metamorphoses of Antoninus Liberalis translated by Francis Celoria (Routledge 1992). Online version at the Topos Text Project.
- Celoria, Francis (October 24, 1992). The Metamorphoses of Antoninus Liberalis: A Translation with a Commentary'. USA, Canada: Routledge. ISBN 0-415-06896-7.
- Jacobs, Joseph; Trübner Nutt, Alfred; Robinson Wright, Arthur; Crooke, William (1904). Folklore. Vol. 15. London, UK: Folklore Society.
- William Smith, A Dictionary of Greek and Roman Biography and Mythology, London. John Murray: printed by Spottiswoode and Co., New-Street Square and Parliament Street, 1873.
