= Hierax (mythology) =

People in Greek mythology

In Greek mythology, Hierax (Ancient Greek: Ἰέραξ, romanized: Hiérax, lit. 'hawk') is the name of the following figures:

- Hierax, a just and honest man from the land of Mariandyni who honoured Demeter greatly and received plentiful harvest from her. When a neighbouring tribe neglected Poseidon, he destroyed Demeter's crops, so Hierax sent them barley, wheat and other food. For this Poseidon changed him into a hawk, a bird as hated by mankind as Hierax had been once loved.
- Hierax, a mortal man who told on Hermes as he tried to sneak in and steal the metamorphosed Argive princess Io from Argus (Io's guardman), forcing Hermes to kill him instead.
