= Korean currency =

Korean currency dates back as far as the Goryeo dynasty (918–1392) when the first coins were minted. The coins, cast in both bronze and iron, were called tongbo and jungbo. Additionally, silver vases called ŭnbyŏng were widely used and circulated as a currency among the aristocracy of Goryeo.

It was not until the beginning of the Joseon period that copper coins called mun were minted for wide circulation. Jeohwa (Korean: 저화; Hanja: 楮貨), which was made of standardized mulberry-bark paper early in the Joseon period, became the first legal paper money and was used as a medium of exchange in place of coins until it disappeared in the early 16th century. From the 17th century until the end of the 19th century, coins denominated in mun bearing the inscription Sang Pyeong Tong Bo (Korean: 상평통보; Hanja: 常平通寶; lit. 'always exact coin') were the most widely circulated currency.

== History ==
The history of Korean currency dates back to around the 3rd century BC, when first coins in the form of knife coins, also known in Korean literature as "Myeongdojun(명도전, in Chinese mingdaoqian, 明刀錢, meaning Ming Knives)" originally belonging to the Chinese state of Yan but also was used in trade with Korean state Gojoseon; which were said to have been circulated. Grain coins were put to use within the kingdoms for a long period of time.

While various items like clam shells, iron, and precious metals were also traded as a medium of exchange in Ancient Korea, the primary forms of currency during this era used in bartering were mainly grain and cloth. During the pre-monetary times, anything related to food and clothing was used as a medium of exchange as well as a method to measure the value of products. The types of grains most commonly used for bartering were rice, barley, beans, and millet. Of these commodities, millet white rice was valued a lot more than regular rice. The most common forms of cloth as currency in ancient Korea were hemp, ramie, and silk. Other goods were calculated as having a certain value that was in relation to fundamental commodities such as grain, rice, and cloth. As a result of the ancient barter-based economy some modern elderly South Koreans still use the phrase "Go to the market and sell some rice(쌀 팔러 간다)" which evokes the idea of trading rice for other products. It would not be until the 17th century that coinage fully replaced the barter system throughout the entire Korean Peninsula.

Hemp was first the most common form of cloth currency but later cotton cloth (or pohwa(포화(布貨))) would become the dominant form of cloth money. Since the Three Kingdoms period, silk was considered to be one of the most highly valued medium of exchange.

As in modern times Xin dynasty era hwacheon (貨泉, 화천) cash have been unearthed in tombs in modern Korea there is minor evidence that these coins might've been used for the international trade of the time. In 2018 Wu Zhu (五銖, 오수) cash coins, known as oshujeon in Korea, were unearthed in the North Gyeongsang province further confirming an ancient trade relation with China.

The first known metallic coinage known to have circulated in ancient Korea was Chinese knife money, this type of Chinese coin circulated in the Kingdom of Yan during the Warring States period, and was brought to the Korean peninsula by Chinese settlers and in modern times specimens of knife money have been excavated in the provinces of Pyeongan and Jeolla. During the Chinese Han dynasty Wu Zhu cash coins which were known as oshujeon (五銖錢, 오수전) in Korean were brought to the Korean peninsula following the Han conquest of Gojoseon in 108 BC. The oshujeon would continue to circulate in the later kingdoms of Goguryeo and Silla of the Korea Three Kingdoms period up to the 10th century CE. Today oshujeon are most commonly found in the tombs of the former Lelang Commandery.

The kingdom of Goryeo issued its own version of grain coins until 1097. The first iron and bronze coins minted in Korea occurred during the 15th year (996 AD) of the reign of King Seonjeong. During the reign of King Sukjong, a monetary system of casting a variety of coins was established in the years 1097–1107. These coins included the 東國 (Dongguk "Eastern Country"), 海東 (Haedong "Eastern Sea") and 三韓 (Samhan "Three States") series of coins. Coins made from metals other than iron like copper and bronze were issued in the 10th and 11th centuries, but their circulation was limited. Silver vases called ŭnbyŏng (銀瓶) were widely used and circulated among the aristocracy of Goryeo.

In 1392, the Goryeo kingdom was overthrown and the state of Joseon dynasty was founded. The founder of the dynasty, Taejong made several attempts to bring about improvements in the prevailing monetary system but they were not a success initially. The attempts include issuing Korean paper currency and issuing coins instead of importing them from China. The coins issued in Korean being unsuccessful led to the issuance of a standardized note made of black mulberry bark called Jeohwa (저화/楮貨), that was used in place of coins. Bronze coins were not cast again until the year 1423 during the reign of King Sejong. These coins had the inscription 朝鮮通寶 (Chosun Tongbo "Chosun currency"). The coins that were minted in the 17th century came out to be a success at last and as a result, 24 mints were established throughout Korea. Coinage formed a major part of the exchange system after this time. In 1633, "mun" was made the main currency of Korea and copper and bronze coins were issued denominated in this currency unit. It prevailed till 1892 when "yang" took over as the main currency. Yang was the first currency that used a decimal system as it was divided into 100 equal fun, though it did not last long.

Won was introduced in 1902 as the official currency unit replacing yang at 1 won = 5 yang. The Bank of Korea was established in 1909 but soon after in 1910 Imperial Japan annexed the Korean Empire. Under Colonial rule, the country was made to use the currency unit "yen" in place of the Korean Won, which took over the Korean won at par. After the division of Korea, the state of South Korea was established and recognized in 1948, and won was again made the official currency of the new state. "jeon" was made the subunit of the currency that divided it into 100 equal parts. Bank of Joseon issued the currency for independent South Korea for the first time, that too in banknotes only.

The country then had to switch over to a new currency unit named "hwan" replacing won at 1 hwan = 100 won. Like South Korean won, this currency unit was also issued in banknotes initially but in 1959, coins denominated in hwan were also issued and were the first circulating coins in South Korea. Hwan had a peg with the US dollar but with time it also got devaluated. This was the reason for the reintroduction of won in 1962 as the official currency unit. South Korean currency was still pegged to the US dollar until in 1997 when it was floated into the world market.

=== Ŭnbyŏng (1101~1331) ===
The ŭnbyŏng (銀瓶, 은병), or hwalgu, were silver vases that were shaped like the Korean Peninsula and were widely used during the Goryeo period, they primarily circulated among the aristocracy. These ŭnbyŏng were produced from the year 1101 and were engraved with an official state seal to mark them as a legitimate currency which was valid throughout Goryeo. The ŭnbyŏng weighed around one Kŭn (斤, 근) which is roughly equal to 600 grams, this made them very useful for paying for large transactions. Historians suggest that the ŭnbyŏng were primarily used by the aristocratic classes and were also often involved in the bribing of government officials. In the year 1282 the government enacted a law that pegged the value of one ŭnbyŏng at between 2,700 and 3,400 litres of rice. But regardless of the fact that this currency was highly impractical for paying for low value items, the ŭnbyŏng would continue to be used during the next two centuries.

During the reign of Chungnyeol of Goryeo the government had permitted the circulation of rough or broken pieces of silver. By the year 1331 the ŭnbyŏng had completely disappeared from circulation. No specimens of the ŭnbyŏng are known to have survived to the modern era.

=== Arrow coins (1464) ===
In the year 1464, King Sejo had introduced a new form of currency known as the "arrow coin" (箭幣; 전폐, chŏn p'ye). This currency was shaped like an arrowhead which allowed it to be used as a medium of exchange during times of peace and as a weapon when the country was fighting another war.

The royal instructions regarding the "arrow coin" and how it should be circulated can be translated as the following excerpt:

"Different moneys were used in different reigns but each one suits its time. The arrow coin, though never used by the ancients, will surely prove useful to a warlike country and we see no reason why it should not be used."

— Mun Heun Pi Ko (文猷備考, 문헌비고)

The blade of the "arrow coin" resembled a leaf of a willow tree and its stem was inscribed with the text P'albang T'onghwa (八方通寶; 팔방통보, which could be translated as either "currency in eight directions" or "eight directions universal money") this text indicated that the "arrow coin" was legal tender throughout Korea.

The arrowhead had a length of 55 millimeters long and its stem was an additional 52 millimeters making the "arrow coin" 107 millimeters long. 1 "arrow coin" was nominally worth 4 pieces of Joseon era paper money.

The new currency did not receive the support of the Korean people causing the failure of yet another attempt to establish a money-based economy in Korea to fail. No surviving specimens of the Korean "arrow coin" have ever been discovered.

=== Mun (1633–1892) ===
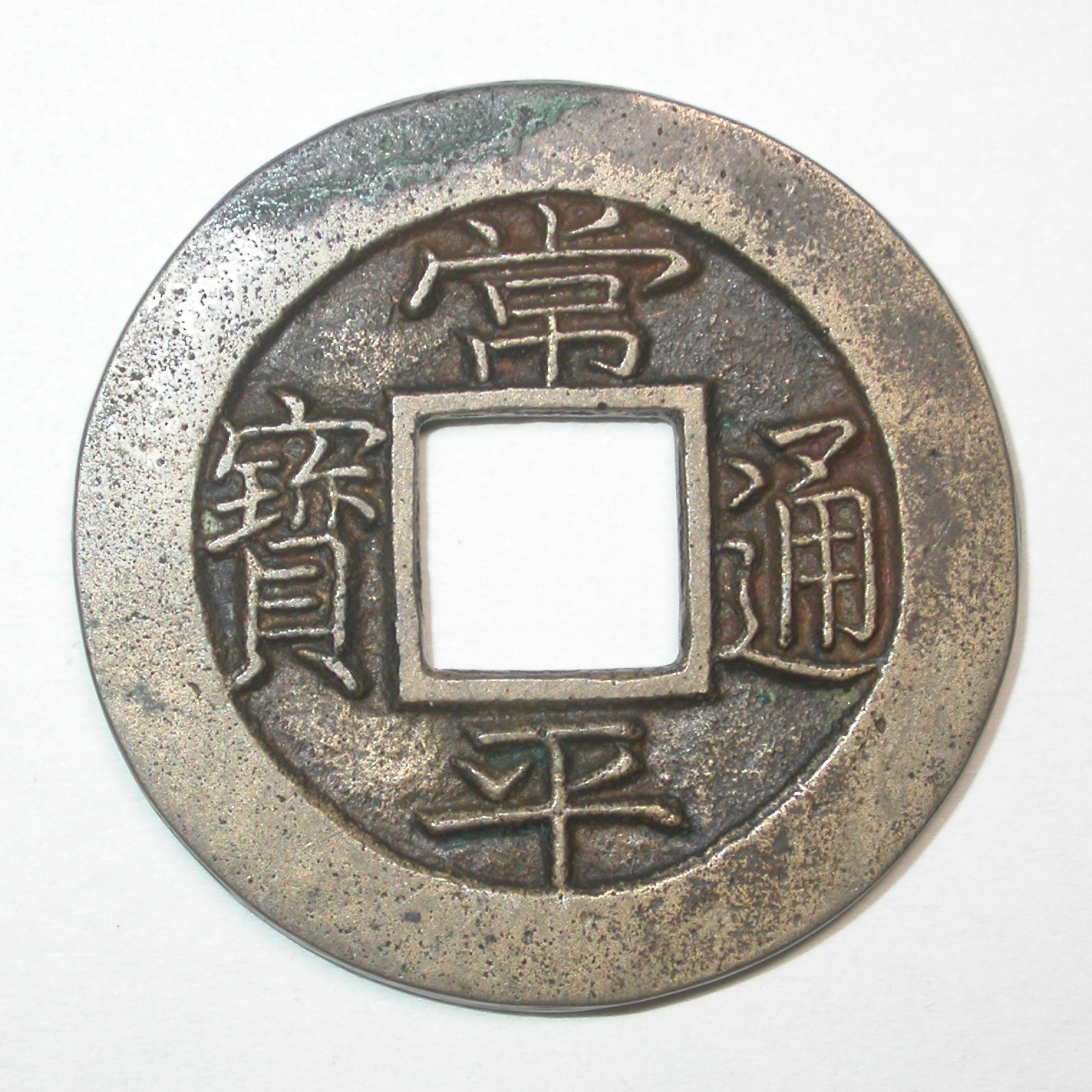
A Sangpyeong Tongbo (常平通寶) cash coin. This series was cast for over two centuries.

The Joseon Dynasty issued its first copper coins.

=== Yang (1892–1902) ===
In 1888, shortly before the yang was introduced, a small number of coins denominated in hwan (圜) and mun (文) were minted. Even though the yang had been used in the past it was reintroduced as the main currency in 1892. One yang (兩) was subdivided into 100 fun (分 poon, pn.), making it the first Korean decimal currency.

The mintage and circulation of modern currency began during the last years of the old Korean Empire as a result of contact with the West. Around the time of the trial adoption of the gold standard in 1901, gold and silver coins were in circulation along with some Japanese banknotes.

=== Won (1902–1910) ===
The won was introduced in 1902, replacing the yang at a rate of 1 won = 5 yang. In 1909, the Bank of Korea was founded in Seoul as a central bank and began issuing currency of modern type. The won was equivalent to the Japanese yen and was replaced by the Korean yen in 1910. At the same time, Korean yen notes issued by Dai-Ichi Bank (First Bank of Japan, 株式會社第一銀行) also circulated.

=== Yen (1910–1945) ===
The yen was the currency of Korea during the Colonial rule, from 1910 to 1945, and was issued by the Bank of Chōsen It was equivalent to the Japanese yen and consisted of Japanese currency and banknotes issued specifically for Korea. It was replaced by the South Korean won at par in 1945, and by the North Korean won in 1947.

== North Korean currency ==
=== Won (1947–present) ===
After the division of Korea, North Korea continued using the Korean yen for 2 years until the Central Bank of the Democratic People's Republic of Korea was established on December 6, 1947, and a new currency was issued. It was at the time pegged at par with the Soviet rouble. It was revalued at a rate of one hundred to one in February 1959 and new won were issued.

In the following years the won faced some devaluation, caused by the subsequent devaluation and redenomination of the Soviet ruble.

From 1978 to 2001, the North Korean government maintained an iconic rate of 2.16 won to the US dollar; since then banks in the country exchange at rates closer to the black market rate. However, rampant inflation has been eroding the North Korean wŏn's value to such an extent that currently it is believed to be worth about the same as the South Korean wŏn (needs sourcing). In any case, the U.S. dollar and other currencies are still worth more in North Korean wŏn on the black market than officially.

== South Korean currencies ==
=== Won (1945–1953) ===
Following the end of the division of Korea, the won was introduced to replace the Korean yen. The won was subdivided into 100 jeon. The first banknotes were issued by the Bank of Joseon in denominations ranging from 5 jeon to 100 won. In 1950 the currency management switched to the Bank of Korea and new notes were then issued, mostly with higher denominations.

The first note put in circulation by the Bank of Korea in 1950 was printed in Japan by the National Printing Bureau (国立印刷局). The next year the Korea Minting and Security Printing Corporation was created and took over as printer of South Korean currency.

At the time of the introduction in 1945 the won was pegged to the Japanese yen at a rate of 1 won = 1 yen. In October of the same year, the anchor currency was changed to the US dollar at a rate of 15 won = 1 dollar. Toward the end of the Korean War the won was devaluated at 6,000 won = 1 dollar. Following that the hwan was introduced as the new currency at a rate of 1 hwan = 100 won.

=== Hwan (1953–1962) ===
Due to devaluation of the won the hwan was introduced on February 15, 1953, at the rate of 1 hwan = 100 won. It was subdivided in 100 jeon, but they were never used. New banknotes in denominations between 10 and 1000 hwan were issued. Starting in 1959, 10 and 50 hwan coins were also issued to replace the lower denomination notes. Those were the first circulating coins in South Korea.

Due to the short notice of the change in currency, the first series of the new notes was commissioned from the United States Government Printing Office. The notes were released in five denominations, all with an identical design. Some replacement notes with a more suited Korean theme were later issued, starting with the 100 hwan just a month later.

The hwan suffered from inflation as well. At its introduction, it was pegged to the United States dollar at 1 dollar = 60 hwan, but toward the end of its life it was devaluated at 1 dollar = 1250 hwan. In 1962, the won was reintroduced at the rate of 1 won = 10 hwan. The 10 and 50 hwan coins were kept in circulation until March 21, 1975.

=== Won (1962–present) ===
After the devaluation of the hwan, the won was reintroduced as South Korea's currency on June 10, 1962.

At the time the South Korean currency was still pegged to the US dollar. It stayed so until December 24, 1997, when it became a floating currency, but was then immediately devalued at nearly half of its value because of the East Asian financial crisis.

== See also ==
- Etymology of the Korean currencies
