= Drug policy of South Korea =

The drug policy of South Korea is one of the strictest in the world. Under South Korean law, its citizens are prohibited from using drugs, even if they are abroad in a country where the use of drugs is legal.

South Koreans are also additionally forbidden to use cannabis, even if they are in countries where cannabis use is legalised or tolerated. Cultivating, transporting or possessing cannabis is also illegal under South Korean criminal law, both domestic and abroad. The South Korean government regularly reminds its citizens of this prohibition. For example, the South Korean Embassy in Canada wrote (after cannabis use was legalized there in October 2018) that "it is illegal for South Koreans to use cannabis, even if they are in a region where cannabis is legal". The South Korean police also recently announced in an appeal that South Koreans can be punished at home if they use cannabis in a country where it is legal.

== Drug test policy ==
Since December 2007, drug tests are mandatory for foreign teachers to be granted the extension of visas. In 2009, American teacher Andrea Vandom complained about the policy and raised the issue at the Constitutional Court, which was dismissed. In 2013, Vandom petitioned the UN Human Rights Committee. United Nations and Korea’s National Human Rights Commission pointed out the policy as discriminatory.

In 2021, a drug test policy for Korean teachers was introduced.

== Anti-kickback legislation ==
In 2013, the government of South Korea announced a reform in the drug anti-kickback law. This extended punishment to include doctors and pharmacists receiving kickbacks for prescribing drugs (not merely the pharmaceutical companies making payments).

== Gender differences ==
According to the ESPAD report (Hibell et al. 2009) the male to female ratio is quite small for cannabis use and tie for any other illicit drug use worldwide. Nevertheless, significantly higher proportions of males than females report illicit drug use in developing countries such as South Africa. The study from (Perkonigg et al. 1998) found that in various countries, like South Korea, approximately twice as many adult men as women reported illicit drug use.

== Drug abuse ==
=== Number of individuals suffering from Substance Use Disorder (SUD) over the past five years ===
Starting from 2013, the numbers of drug abuse has become increasingly high. Not only people who are using drugs, but also those with substance use disorder (SUD). In 2013 the article from KoreaBioMed, has shown that substance use disorder reached 15,000 a year and 77,000 people received treatment over the last five years. Hereby, the number of patients with substance use disorder has risen with the need for a new measure to control the problem.

However, there are still drug crimes in South Korea. The majority of drug-related crimes are mostly in Gangnam and Yongsan districts. Drugs are usually distributed through clubs, in Gangnam, foreign students and club operators tend to be involved in drug trafficking, which is an easy way to make money. The most common drug that is used and sold is methamphetamine; this is accountable for most drug-related arrests. Moreover, other drugs known are MDMA and cannabis. These continue to grow in popularity among students. However, methamphetamine remains the drug of choice for Koreans.

Region	2014	2015	2016	2017	2018	Total	Five-year change rate
Seoul	2775	2404	2616	2406	3154	13355	13.7
Busan	1232	1065	1067	1070	1274	5708	3.4
Incheon	1078	1040	1134	938	1279	5469	18.6
Daegu	939	828	936	899	960	4562	2.2
Gwangju	330	309	327	347	459	1772	39.1
Daejon	441	502	506	717	793	2959	79.8
Ulsan	365	324	261	235	230	1415	-37.0
Gyeonggi Province	4150	3528	3504	3403	3907	18492	-5.9
Gangwon Province	640	562	511	482	482	2677	-24.7
North Chungcheong Province	500	435	419	372	314	2040	-37.2
North Jeolla Province	627	458	398	363	444	2990	-29.2
South Jeolla Province	584	589	564	493	463	2693	-20.7
North Gyeongsang Province	991	829	892	803	768	4283	-22.5
South Gyeongsang Province	933	874	752	680	737	3976	-21.0

=== Koreans abroad using drugs in a country where it is legal ===
According to the Korean law it is strictly forbidden for Korean citizens who live abroad to use drugs, even though some drugs are legal in the country where they'd live. For example, the Netherlands has decriminalized cannabis and certain other ‘soft’ drugs, but others, such as MDMA and crystal meth remain strictly forbidden. However, South Korean law forbids Korean citizens living abroad from using drugs. With this law, Koreans are prohibited from smoking cannabis, even if they are in a country where cannabis use has been legalized or tolerated. Upon returning to South Korea, people who violate this law can be sentenced to up to five years in prison. The production, transport or possession of cannabis overseas is also illegal under South Korean law.

Despite many countries in the globe loosening their drug restrictions South Korea has remained very strict about their citizen’s drug use. These restrictions have incentivized Koreans to seek illegal methods to obtain drugs. Many citizens, especially students studying abroad, use this opportunity to explore drugs during their time in their new host country since access to them is more accessible. People can become dependent on these drugs so that when they return home they continue to seek them, giving way for the illegal drug market to grow in South Korea. Even cannabis in the form of electronic cigarettes or edibles, which is legal in many parts of the world, is deemed punishable by the Korean government and if caught a person can be sentenced to prison and fines.

=== Prescription drug use ===
As the population in South Korea continued to grow, the demand for higher quality healthcare services has increasingly followed as well. Surprisingly pharmaceutical expenditures have placed a large financial burden on civilians and healthcare insurers who are attempting to meet the exponentially rising costs of the pharmaceutical market. Between 2002 and 2013, the costs of pharmaceutical products rose from “10.2% annually to 28.3%”. These price increases were caused by the lack of separation between prescribing and dispensing of drugs in the health care system. Pharmacists had the power to both prescribe and dispense drugs to the public thus “creating financial incentives” for them to sell products/drugs that were marked at “higher margins” despite other medicine alternatives existing. Physicians soon realized the profit that they could make from pharmaceuticals and thus began overprescribing drugs to patients rather than offering medical services to increase their income.

In efforts to alleviate South Koreans from increased financial costs and contain the increasing prices of pharmaceuticals the government implemented the “Drug Expenditure Rationalization Plan”. In addition to lowering costs the policy also put strict restrictions on the drugs that their healthcare insurance would cover in efforts to limit overconsumption/prescription of drugs. However this policy left adverse affects on patients with chronic illness and low income status because they could not meet the new out of pocket costs that were placed on medications that didn’t qualify under the country’s covered drug list. A study conducted by Asia-Pacific Journal of Public Health concluded income level and prescription drug use were associated to one another. Based on the South Korea population, the more wealthier an individual is the more likely they are to consume prescription drugs despite the high number of ill cases in low-income groups.

==== Legal medical marijuana in South Korea ====
Since 2020, South Korea made medical applications of marijuana legal. As a result CBD (hemp oil or cannabidiol) became legal only for medical use. South Korea however remains strict against the use of drugs.

== See also ==
- Cannabis in South Korea
- Drug liberalization
- Legality of cannabis
- Arguments for and against drug prohibition
- Drug policy
- War on drugs
- Drug overdose
