= Cerberus (mythology) =

List of characters in Greek myth with the name "Cerberus"

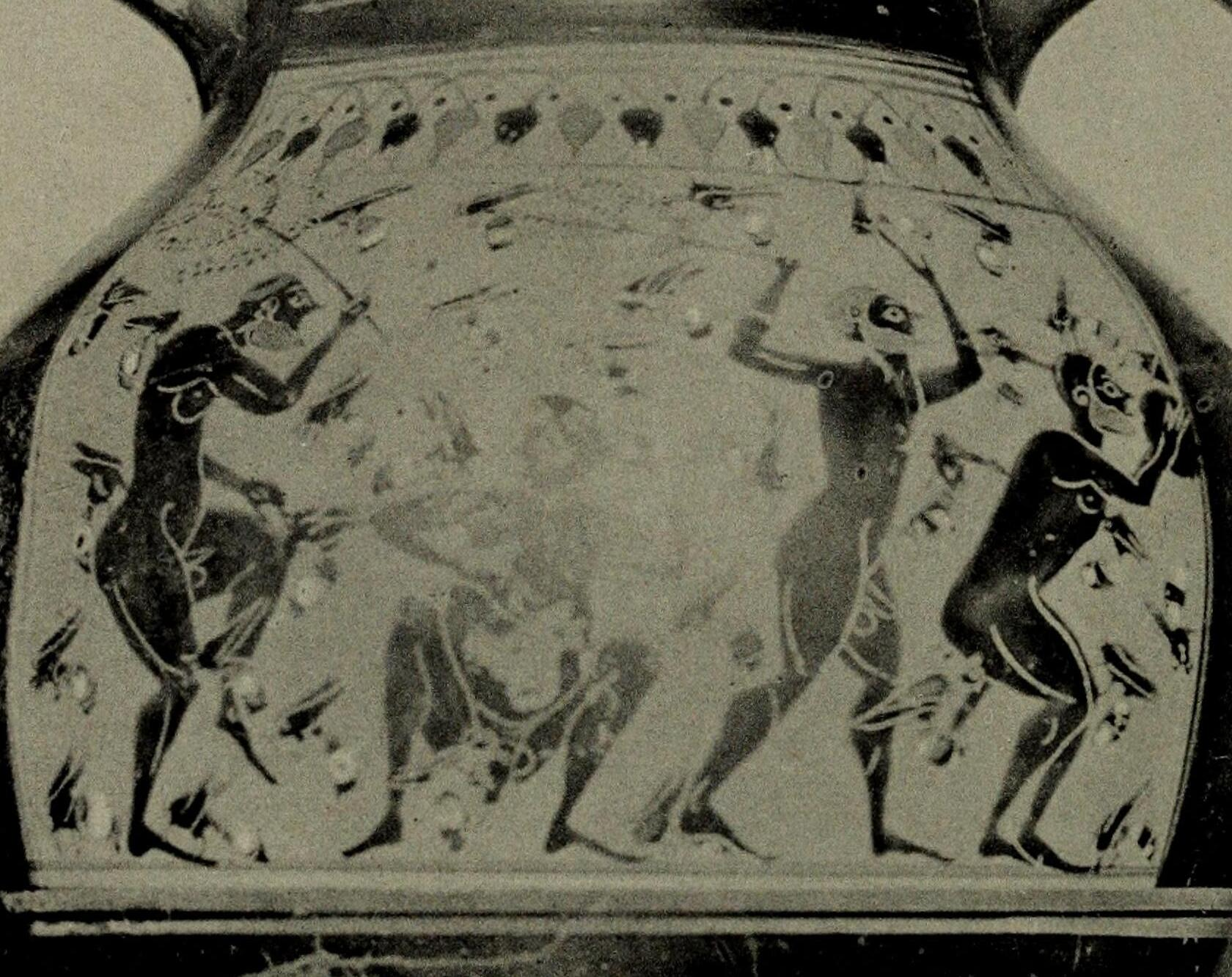
Cerberus and his 3 companions in the Dictaean Cave, black-figure Attic amphora circa 540 BC, British Museum

In Greek mythology, Cerberus (/ˈsɜːrbərəs/; Ancient Greek: Κέρβερος Kérberos [ˈkerberos]) may refer to a character and a mythical canine:

- Cerberus, one of the Suitors of Penelope who came from Same along with other 22 wooers. He, with the other suitors, was shot dead by Odysseus with the assistance of Eumaeus, Philoetius, and Telemachus.
- Cerberus, the multi-headed hound of the Underworld.
- Cerberus, a Cretan man who along with three others (Aegolius, Celeus and Laius) attempted to steal honey from the sacred cave in Crete, where Zeus had been brought up. Zeus intended to kill them for the insolence, but because the cave was sacred, he turned them into birds; Cerberus became a kerberos, an unidentified species of bird.
