= Pyrrhus (mythology) =

Mythological figure

In Nonnus's fifth-century AD epic poem the Dionysiaca, Pyrrhus (Ancient Greek: Πύρρος, romanized: Púrrhos, lit. 'fiery') is a minor figure from Asia Minor who was punished by the goddess Rhea, the mother of the gods, for his attempted assault of her. His short story is only mentioned in passing, without much elaboration.

== Etymology ==
The ancient Greek proper name Πύρρος means "fiery" or "red-coloured" and it is derived from the word πῦρ (pur) meaning fire, flame. It was especially used to denote red hair. In Mycenaean Greek the name is attested in the form pu-wo (Linear B: 𐀢𐀺).

== Mythology ==
The little-known and otherwise unattested Pyrrhus was a mortal man from Phrygia, a region in northwestern Asia Minor, who impiously lusted after the goddess Rhea, the mother of the gods, and tried to assault her. Rhea changed him into a stone immediately as a punishment for his hubris. This happened not far from the site of Niobe's own transformation into a weeping rock after she challenged another goddess, Leto (the mother of Artemis and Apollo).

== Interpretation ==
Pyrrhus's transformation into stone is part of a wider common theme in mythology where a man is punished for his lust that led him to assault a goddess, in this case Rhea; it also belongs to the type of myth where a goddess' favourite oversteps himself and attempts to rape her. He is possibly the same Pyrrhus as the shepherd protagonist of a Clazomenian legend mentioned in passing by Pausanias; the Clazomenians also had a cave dedicated to the mother of Pyrrhus.

== See also ==
- Antigone
- Calydon
- Ixion
- Olenus

== Bibliography ==
- Beekes, Robert S. P. (2010). Lucien van Beek (ed.). Etymological Dictionary of Greek. Leiden Indo-European Etymological Dictionary Series. Vol. ΙΙ. Leiden, the Netherlands: Brill Publications. ISBN 978-90-04-17419-1.
- Forbes Irving, Paul M. C. (1990). Metamorphosis in Greek Myths. Oxford Classical Monographs. Oxford, New York, Toronto: Oxford University Press, Clarendon Press. ISBN 0-19-814730-9.
- Levitan, William; Lombardo, Stanley (August 15, 2022). Tales of Dionysus: The Dionysiaca of Nonnus of Panopolis. Michigan, United States: University of Michigan Press. ISBN 978-0-472-13311-6.
- Liddell, Henry George; Scott, Robert (1940). A Greek-English Lexicon, revised and augmented throughout by Sir Henry Stuart Jones with the assistance of Roderick McKenzie. Oxford: Clarendon Press. Online version at Perseus.tufts project.
- Nonnus, Dionysiaca; translated by Rouse, W H D, I Books I-XV. Loeb Classical Library No. 344, Cambridge, Massachusetts, Harvard University Press; London, William Heinemann Ltd. 1940. Internet Archive
- Pausanias, Description of Greece with an English Translation by W.H.S. Jones, Litt.D., and H.A. Ormerod, M.A., in 4 Volumes. Cambridge, MA, Harvard University Press; London, William Heinemann Ltd. 1918. Online version at the Perseus Digital Library.
